= Yongsong Huang =

American scientist

- Education: University of Science and Technology of China (B.Sc.); Sichuan University (M.S.); Chinese Academy of Sciences (Ph.D.); University of Bristol (Ph.D.)
- Scientific career
- Fields: Organic geochemistry, paleoclimatology, astrobiology
- Workplaces: University of Bristol; Pennsylvania State University; Woods Hole Oceanographic Institution; Brown University
- Doctoral advisor: Geoffrey Eglinton

Yongsong Huang is a Chinese-American organic geochemist, biogeochemist and astrobiologist, and is a professor of Earth, Environmental, and Planetary Sciences at Brown University. He researches the development of lipid biomarkers and their isotopic ratios as quantitative proxies for paleoclimate and paleoenvironmental studies and subsequent application of these proxies to study mechanisms controlling climate change and environmental response to climate change at a variety of time scales.

== Education ==
Huang received a B.Sc. in geochemistry from University of Science and Technology of China in 1984, then received a M.S. in Analytical Chemistry from Sichuan University. He earned his first Ph.D. in petroleum geochemistry from the Chinese Academy of Sciences in 1990, and earned a second Ph.D. in organic geochemistry from the University of Bristol in 1997, as a student of Geoffrey Eglinton.

== Career and research ==
Huang is an organic geochemist, biogeochemist and astrobiologist. After graduating from the University of Bristol, he joined the lab of Katherine H. Freeman at Pennsylvania State University as a postdoctoral research associate. He periodically worked as a guest investigator with Timothy Eglinton at the Woods Hole Oceanographic Institution during his postdoc. In 2000, Huang joined the faculty of Brown University, where he was awarded tenure in 2012.

Huang's primary fields are organic geochemistry, geochemistry, and paleoclimatology. He is particularly well known for his work developing organic geochemical proxies of climate change and reconstructing climates sediments.

According to Scopus, he has published 187 research articles so far with 9681 citations and has an H-index of 55.

=== Notable student advisees ===
- Juzhi Hou (Ph.D. 2008)
- William D'Andrea (Ph.D. 2008)
- Jaime Toney (Ph.D. 2011)
- Elizabeth Thomas (Ph.D. 2014)

=== Editorial activities ===
- 2000 to present: Member of the editorial board for the Journal of Paleolimnology.

=== Academic honors ===
- 1991-1992: British Royal Society Queen's Fellowship.
- 2001: Salamon Award, Brown University
- 2009: Hans Fellow, Germany
- 2011-2012: Teagle Fellow, Brown University

== Selected works ==
=== Journal articles ===
- Northern hemisphere controls on tropical southeast African climate during the past 60,000 years.
- Climate change as the dominant control on glacial-interglacial variations in C3 and C4 plant abundance.
