= Jessica Tierney =

American paleoclimatologist

- Born: 1982 (age 43–44); San Francisco, CA
- Education: Brown University, B.A., M.Sc., & Ph.D.
- Awards: NSF Alan T. Waterman Award Packard Foundation Fellow AGU Fellow
- Scientific career
- Fields: Paleoclimatology, Paleoceanography
- Workplaces: University of Arizona, Professor, 2015 - Present
- Thesis: An Organic Geochemical Perspective on Tropical East African Paleoclimate (2010)
- Doctoral advisor: James M. Russell
- Other academic advisors: Peter B. de Menocal
- Notable students: Tripti Bhattacharya
- Website: www.geo.arizona.edu/~jesst/

Jessica E. Tierney (born 1982) is an American paleoclimatologist who has worked with geochemical proxies such as marine sediments, mud, and TEX_{86}, to study past climate in East Africa. Her papers have been cited more than 2,500 times; her most cited work is Northern Hemisphere Controls on Tropical Southeast African Climate During the Past 60,000 Years. Tierney is currently a professor of geosciences and the Thomas R. Brown Distinguished Chair in Integrative Science at the University of Arizona and faculty affiliate in the University of Arizona School of Geography, Development and Environment Tierney is the first climatologist to win NSF's Alan T Waterman Award (2022) since its inception in 1975.

== Early life and education ==
Tierney was born in San Francisco, California, and grew up in Marin County. Tierney completed her bachelor's degree in geology in 2005 at Brown University, where she researched trace elements in Peru Margin sediments for her thesis. She completed her Masters and PhD in geology at Brown University with a focus in paleoclimatology and organic geochemistry under the advisement of James M. Russell. At Brown, she also worked closely with Yongsong Huang. Sediment cores from Lake Tanganyika allowed Tierney to examine changes in precipitation and temperature during the past glacial cycle in East Africa. She completed her postdoctoral work at Lamont–Doherty Earth Observatory with paleo-oceanographer Peter deMenocal. Tierney worked as an assistant scientist at Woods Hole Oceanographic Institution before arriving at the University of Arizona where she is an associate professor.

== Research ==
Tierney is notable in paleoclimatology for her climate research using organic biomarkers. Her career studying past climate change was driven by her passion for both history and science. Tierney, along with Peter deMenocal and Paul Zander, studied the past climate of the Horn of Africa. They took cores of marine sediment, testing for alkenones, and concluded that about 70,000 years ago this region experienced a change from a wet climate to a dry, cold climate. Tierney and the co-authors determine this climate shift, which coincides with climate change and human activity, to be the force behind human migration. In addition, Tierney uses mud and leaf wax to learn about precipitation and the evolution of monsoons. Tierney also uses TEX86, a biomarker that tracks temperature, to study past climate in the tropics on decadal and interannual scales; for example, examining the relationship Indo-Pacific variability and East African rainfall.

== Awards ==
- NSF's Alan T. Waterman Award (2022)
- A lead author for the Sixth Assessment Report of the Intergovernmental Panel on Climate Change (IPCC), 2021
- Packard Science and Engineering Fellowship (2015–2020)
- Pieter Schenk Award (2015)
- James B. Macelwane Medal (2014)

== Selected publications ==
- Northern hemisphere controls on tropical southeast African climate during the past 60,000 years, Science, 2008
- Distributions of branched GDGTs in a tropical lake system: implications for lacustrine application of the MBT/CBT paleoproxy, Organic Geochemistry, 2009
- Environmental controls on branched tetraether lipid distributions in tropical East African lake sediments, Geochimica et Cosmochimica Acta, 2010
- Multidecadal variability in East African hydroclimate controlled by the Indian Ocean, Nature, 2013
- Late-twentieth-century warming in Lake Tanganyika unprecedented since AD 500, Nature Geoscience, 2010
- Late Quaternary behavior of the East African monsoon and the importance of the Congo Air Boundary, Quaternary Science Reviews, 2011
- Abrupt Shifts in Horn of Africa Hydroclimate Since the Last Glacial Maximum, Science, 2013
- Coordinated hydrological regimes in the Indo- Pacific region during the past two millennia, Paleoceanography, 2010
- A molecular perspective on Late Quaternary climate and vegetation change in the Lake Tanganyika basin, East Africa, Quaternary Science Reviews, 2010
