= Marilyn Fogel =

American geo-ecologist (1952–2022)

Marilyn L. Fogel
- Fogel in 2016
- Born: September 19, 1952; Moorestown, New Jersey, U.S.
- Died: May 11, 2022 (aged 69)
- Education: Penn State (BS in Biology, 1973); UT Austin (PhD in Botany and Marine Sciences, 1977)
- Spouse: Christopher Wood Swarth
- Awards: Alfred Treibs Medal (2013) Fellow to the AAAS (2012) Elected Member of the National Academy of Sciences (2019) V.M. Goldschmidt Award (2022)
- Scientific career
- Fields: Geo-ecology; Organic geochemistry; Astrobiology
- Workplaces: Geophysical Laboratory; UC Merced; UC Riverside
- Thesis: Carbon isotope fractionation by ribulose 1,5-biphosphate carboxylase from various organisms (1977)
- Doctoral advisors: Chase Van Baalen; Patrick Parker; F. Robert Tabita
- Other academic advisors: Thomas C. Hoering
- Notable students: Post-docs: Jennifer Eigenbrode

Marilyn L. Fogel (September 19, 1952 – May 11, 2022) was an American geo-ecologist and Professor of Geo-ecology at UC Riverside in Riverside, California. She is known for her research using stable isotope mass spectrometry to study a variety of subjects including ancient climates, biogeochemical cycles, animal behavior, ecology, and astrobiology. Fogel served in many leadership roles, including Program Director at the National Science Foundation in geobiology and low-temperature geochemistry.

She was the second female staff scientist at the Carnegie Institution for Science's Geophysical Laboratory and the first female recipient of the Alfred Treibs Medal from the Geochemical Society for her achievements in the field of organic geochemistry.

== Early life ==
Fogel was born on September 19, 1952, in Moorestown, New Jersey.

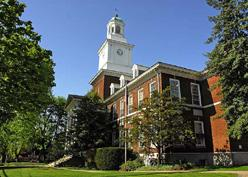
Trickett Hall at Penn State

In 1970 she enrolled at Pennsylvania State University, where she majored in biology, graduating in 1973 with a BS in biology with honors. Her undergraduate research mentor, Dr. Peter Given, helped her apply to UT-Austin for graduate school. She took a gap year before beginning grad school where she traveled in Europe and developed a small jewelry business making pins from eyeglass lenses.

== Academic career ==
At the University of Texas, Austin, Fogel worked with Chase Van Baalen, Patrick Parker, and F. Robert Tabita on her dissertation, titled "Carbon isotope fractionation by ribulose 1,5-biphosphate carboxylase from various organisms". She graduated in 1977 with a PhD in Botany and Marine Sciences, and immediately accepted a position as a postdoctoral fellow (1977–1979) at the Geophysical Lab at the Carnegie Institution for Science under the mentorship of Thomas C. Hoering. While in graduate school, she also owned an ice cream truck to help cover her expenses.

Following her postdoc position, Fogel was hired in 1979 as a Staff Member at the Geophysical Lab, working in biogeochemistry, where she remained until 2012. At that time she was the second female staff member (scientist) in the history of the Geophysical Lab, which was established in 1905. While there, Fogel was also a visiting scientist at Carnegie's Department of Plant Biology (1985–1986), a visiting professor at the Department of Earth Sciences at Dartmouth College (1995), a visiting professor at the department of geology at the University of Maryland (2003–2005), and a Smithsonian Environmental Research Center Fellow (2003–2009).

In 2012, she moved from Washington DC to the University of California, Merced where she accepted a position as a full professor in the School of Natural Sciences and soon became the chair of the Life and Environmental Sciences Unit. There, she taught courses on the fundamentals of ecology, biogeochemistry, stable isotope ecology, field ecology, and the anthropocene.

In 2016, she relocated to UC Riverside in Riverside, California, where she assumed several leadership roles: inaugural holder of the Wilbur Mayhew Endowed Chair in Geo-Ecology (2017), first director of the new EDGE Institute (Environmental Dynamics & Geo-Ecology), and professor of Geo-ecology in the Earth and Environmental Sciences Department. Her research there focused on geo-ecology, astrobiology, paleontology, and anthropology. She also supervised two PhD students and served on the committees of other graduate students.

=== Research ===
Stable isotope ratios vary as a result of many biological and abiotic processes in the environment, changing over time, location, organism, and environment. The field of isotope geochemistry largely relies upon these natural variations, and can be incorporated into biological, ecological, chemical, and geological studies. Using isotope ratios, often ^{2}H/^{1}H, 𝛿^{13}C, the ^{15}N/^{14}N ratio, and ^{18}O/^{16}O, Fogel has studied modern and ancient ecosystems, and has begun to apply the same techniques to study extraterrestrial material in martian meteorites, helping to advance the field of astrobiology.

==== Paleo-ecology and climate change ====
Fogel used isotope ratios in ancient sediments and fossils to trace climate, diet, and species presence over time.

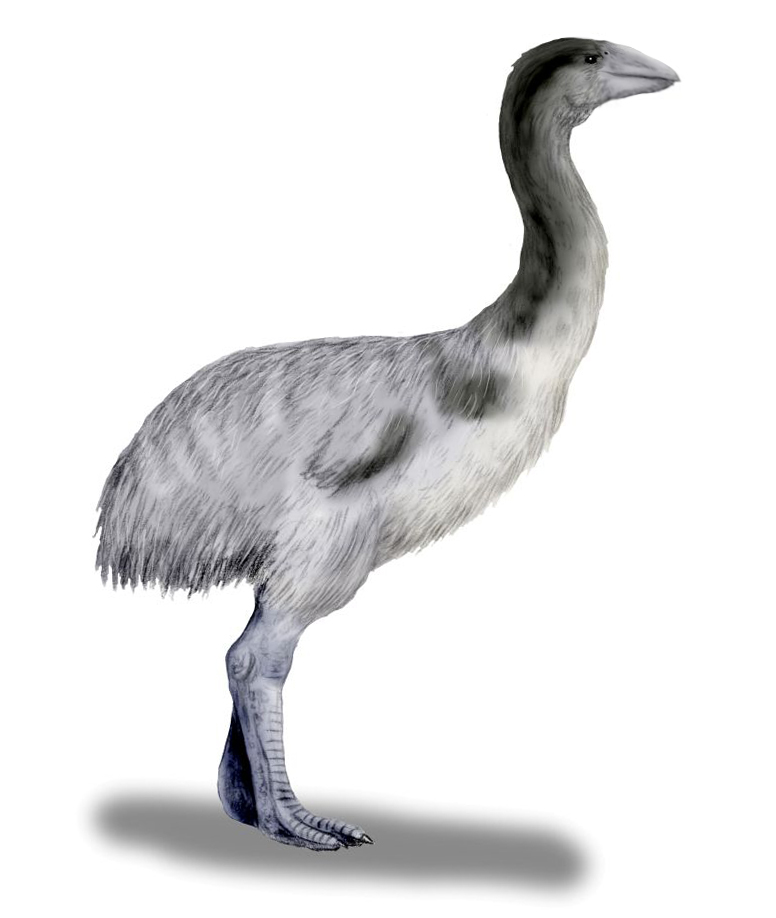
Artist's rendition of Genyornis newtoni

In one study, she and collaborators used eggshell fragments from Genyornis newtoni (a large, extinct flightless bird) in Australia that ranged in age from 100,000 to 50,000 years to show that the bird's extinction 50,000 years ago was likely due to human impact rather than climate changes. 40,000 years ago, Australia went through a dry period, as recorded in Emu (Dromaius novaehollandiae) egg shells, but the extinction of Genyornis 50,000 years ago rather than 40,000 suggests that their extinction was likely unrelated to the drying. Using stable carbon isotopes, her group determined that Genyornis consumed nearly exclusively C_{3} plants, and that their cranial morphology indicated a browser reliant upon shrubland. Because it seems that the Genyornis diet is fairly restrictive, it is likely that the arrival of humans around 55,000 years ago and their burning of land may have caused some megafauna extinction as it changed the vegetation. She has used similar techniques to study amino acids in the elephant birds of Madagascar and measure the isotope ratios in modern ostrich eggshells as a calibration tool for paleoenvironmental studies of Africa.

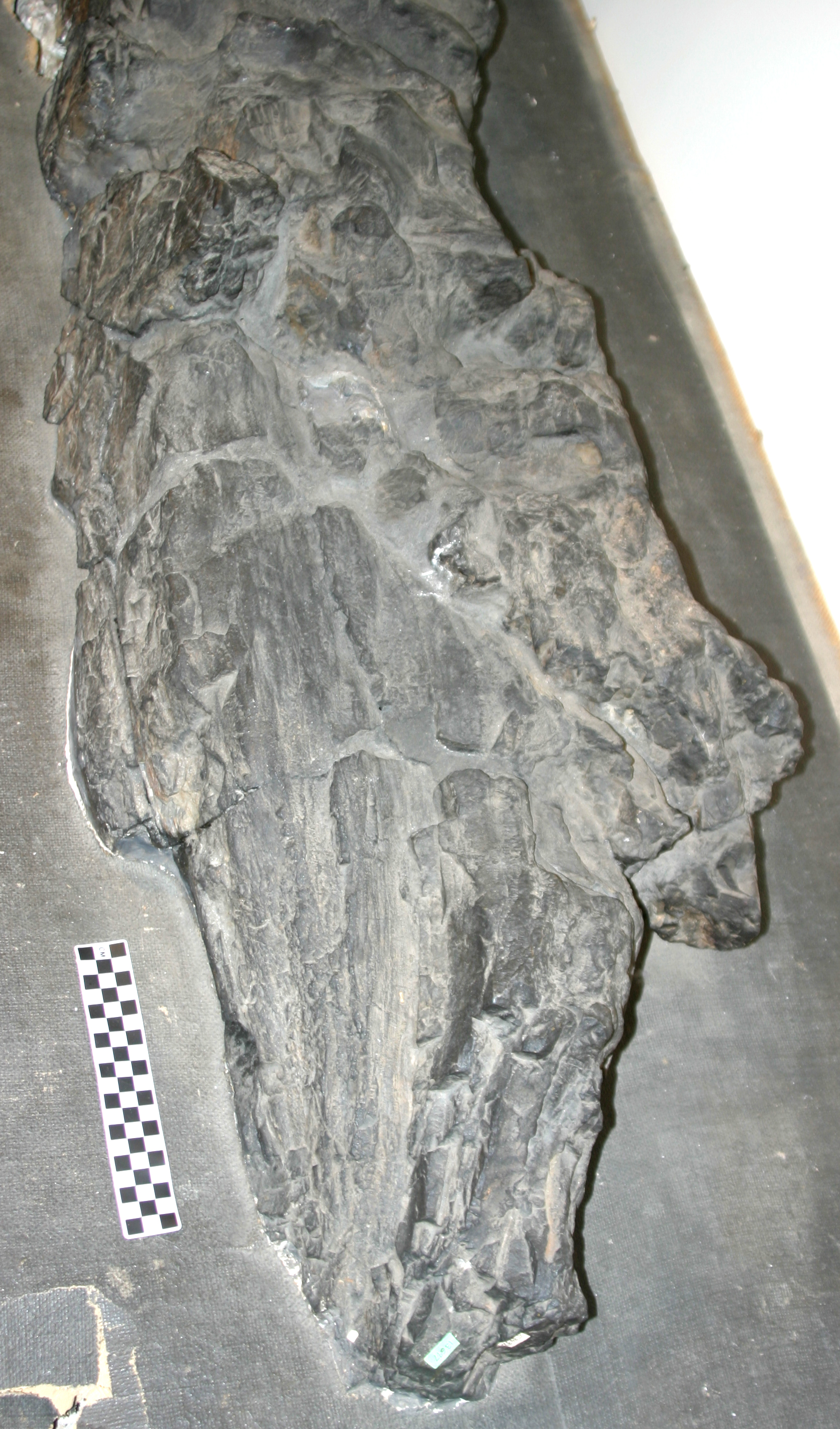
Fossilized portion of a Prototaxites loganii from the middle Devonian

Isotope ratios can also indicate species and diet characteristics in fossilized specimens. A Paleozoic fossil of Prototaxites has attracted attention dating back to 1859 due to its odd tree-like trunk measuring up to 8m long. Because the Paleozoic Era was one of drastic organismal shift, and the origin of vascular plants, it was previously unclear if Prototaxites were vascular plants or fungal species. However, a team of researchers, including Fogel, found the 𝛿^{13}C of the species to be as much as 13‰ different from contemporaneous vascular plants, suggesting that Prototaxites are in fact heterotrophs, and more likely a fungus.

Using carbon isotope ratios in prehistoric human bone collagen, Fogel was able to study the diet of ancient humans. North American humans were either primarily maize eaters, which is a C_{4} plant, or primarily hunter-gatherers, which contains more C_{3} plants. Using this knowledge, Fogel measured the 𝛿^{13}C values of essential amino acids to indicate whether the ancient human populations consumed primarily maize or were hunter-gatherers. Similarly, she was able to measure the marine nitrogen presence in human skeletons on Easter Island to establish that they consumed large amounts of marine food, and used the ^{15}N enrichment in infants to determine the length of nursing in prehistoric populations.

==== Modern ecosystems ====
Isotopic ratios are often used to trace the flow of certain elements through environmental systems. "Tagging" a molecule with an unusual isotope can allow a researcher to study a specific molecule and follow it in ecosystems, a technique known as using environmental tracers. Beyond human tagged compounds, natural isotope abnormalities occur as a result of various biotic and abiotic processes, and can often be found to vary across regions and species. Fogel has used these variations as natural ways to track animal movements, diets, and environmental shifts, and has also investigated the specific mechanisms that lead to environmental isotope fractionation.

As an example of a biotic fractionation event, respiration has led to an enrichment of ^{18}O in the atmosphere relative to ^{16}O. The isotopic ratio of ^{18}O/^{16}O is +23.5‰ relative to V-SMOW, and this ratio should also be observed in oxygen's consumption ratios. In one of the first major studies of plant oxygen consumption and fractionation, Guy, Fogel, and Berry defined the oxygen fractionation effects of various plant functions. They found that plants do not fraction oxygen isotopes in the photolysis of water in spinach thylakoids, but that they did discriminate against ^{18}O during oxygen uptake by 21.3‰ during the oxygenation of Rubisco in spinach and by 22.7‰ during the photorespiration of phosphoglycate by glycate oxidase. The fractionation during oxygen uptake in these two processes contribute strongly to the 18O/^{16}O of the atmosphere, which is about 1.0235 times that of seawater.

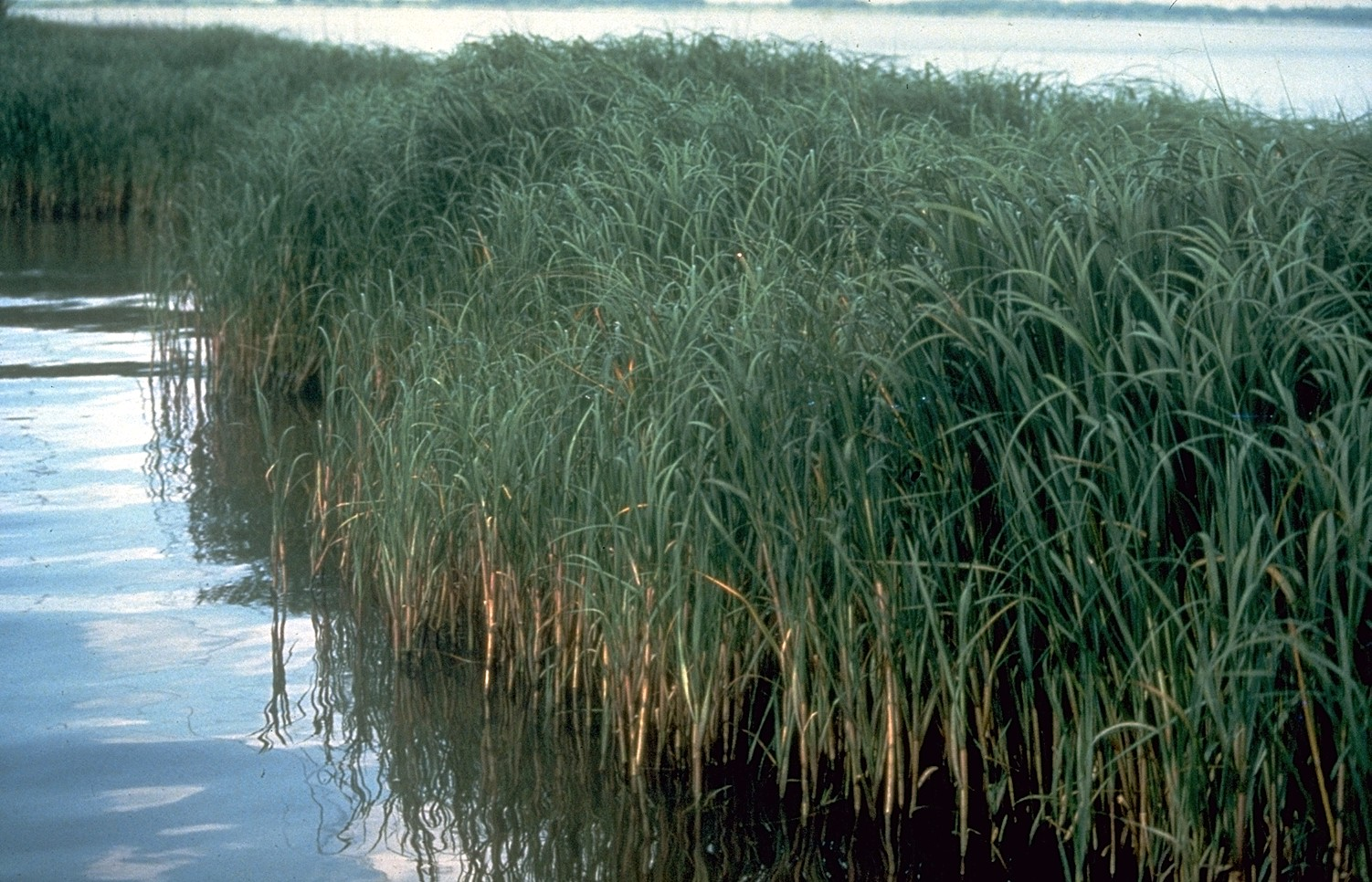
Saltwater cordgrass, or Spartina alterniflora

When it comes to tracing isotopes through the ecosystems, carbon-13 is often used. However, because plants contain such a large portion of the biomass, this tracer relies upon the assumption that the various components of plant tissues all contain the same isotopic ratios. Benner, Fogel, and Hodson proved that this isn't the case. Lignin, the main structural polymer in plants, was found to be depleted in ^{13}C by 2–6‰ relative to the whole plant, and by 4–7‰ relative to the cellulose in saltwater cordgrass. This discovery suggests that, when using isotope tracers in the environment, it's important to compare similar types of molecules.

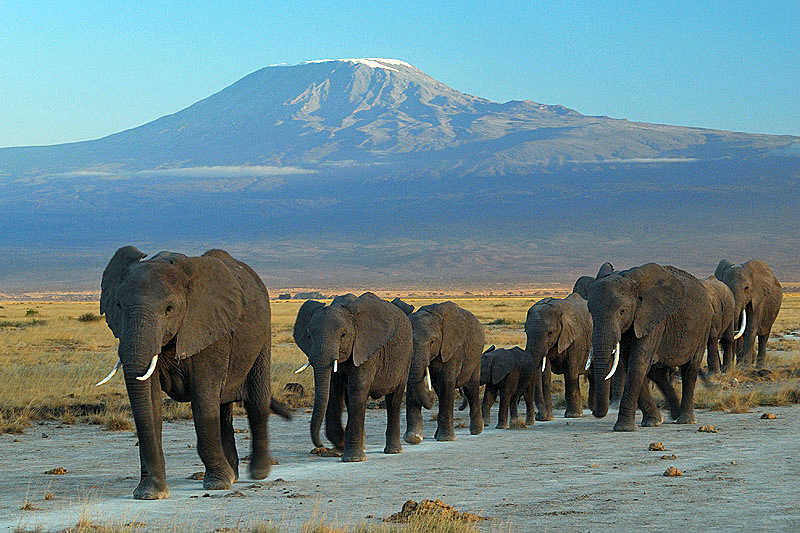
African elephants at Amboseli National Park in Kenya

Animal migration patterns can be traced as the isotope ratios fluctuate depending on their location to match their intake. Fogel has used carbon, nitrogen, and strontium isotope ratios to study African elephant diet and habitat use in the Amboseli Park in Kenya. Carbon isotope ratios vary by plant type, and so a change in carbon ratio of an elephant can indicate a shift in diet from trees to grasses. Strontium isotope ratios are reflected in the geologic age of bedrock, and so can be used as a tracer of the concentration of elephants within the park. In Great Gray Owls, migration is thought to cause a large amount of nutritional stress. Tracing the ^{15}N/^{14}N and 𝛿^{13}C ratios in the birds' muscle tissues along with the contents of the birds' stomachs showed that nutritionally stressed owls were too weak to hunt, and at the brink of irreversible starvation as a result of their migration. Stable isotope ratios can also reveal diet specialization and shifts as specific carbon and nitrogen ratios are often indicative of groups of organisms. Using these ratios, Fogel has worked on diet studies on California sea otters, butterflies, blue crabs, killer whales, San Joaquin kit foxes, and bald eagles.

These same techniques of isotope fractionation investigations have also been used to study human environmental impacts. Because organic sewage outflow is enriched in ^{15}N, she and her collaborators have been able to study the impacts of human sewage on coral reef systems by drawing a correlation between the ^{15}N/^{14}N ratio and the percentage of diseased coral species, as well as the impacts of chicken houses on nearby ecosystems.

==== Astrobiology ====
As a Team Member of the NASA Astrobiology Institute from 1998 to 2010, Fogel worked on the Arctic Mars Analog Svalbard Expedition team in addition to her own collaborative research. One such project focused upon organic matter in carbonaceous chondrite meteorites where they measured the amino acid presence in three meteorites. First, to make sure that the amino acids were extraterrestrial in origin, they measured the 𝛿^{13}C values of the amino acids in the meteorites, which turned out to be significantly higher than the 𝛿^{13}C value of amino acids on Earth, confirming that they were not contamination from Earth (+31.6‰ to +50.5‰ in the meteorites relative to −70‰ to 11.25‰ present on Earth). The team of researchers also found that two of the meteorites had the highest ever detected amino acid abundances, which may be because carbonaceous chondrites are the most primitive and least altered meteorites. Two of the meteorites also had a similar carbon isotope value to a meteorite measured previously, which may indicate a reservoir of the amino acids in the interstellar medium.

In 2012, Steele et al. announced that ten out of the eleven measured martian meteorites contained abiotic macromolecular organic carbon in high-temperature forming minerals (igneous rocks). Organic carbon presence inside of high-temperature forming minerals indicates that the martian magmas precipitated reduced carbon species during crystallization. These results supported an idea initially postulated by Hirshmann and Withers that the martian atmosphere was formed from a reduced mantle. The reducing conditions indicated by the meterotic carbon content tentatively supports abiotic production of methane on Mars.

=== Academic service and honors ===
In 2012, Marilyn Fogel was elected as a Fellow to the American Association for the Advancement of Science and given the Sigma Xi Distinguished Scientist Award from the UC Merced Chapter. Also in 2013, she was awarded the Alfred Treibs Medal in the Organic Geochemistry Division from the Geochemical Society, which recognizes major achievements over a career in organic geochemistry. She was the first woman to win this prize. From 2015 to 2016, Fogel served as the President to the Biogeosciences Section of the American Geophysical Union, and became the Wilbur W. Mayhew Endowed Professor of Geo-Ecology at UC Riverside in 2017.

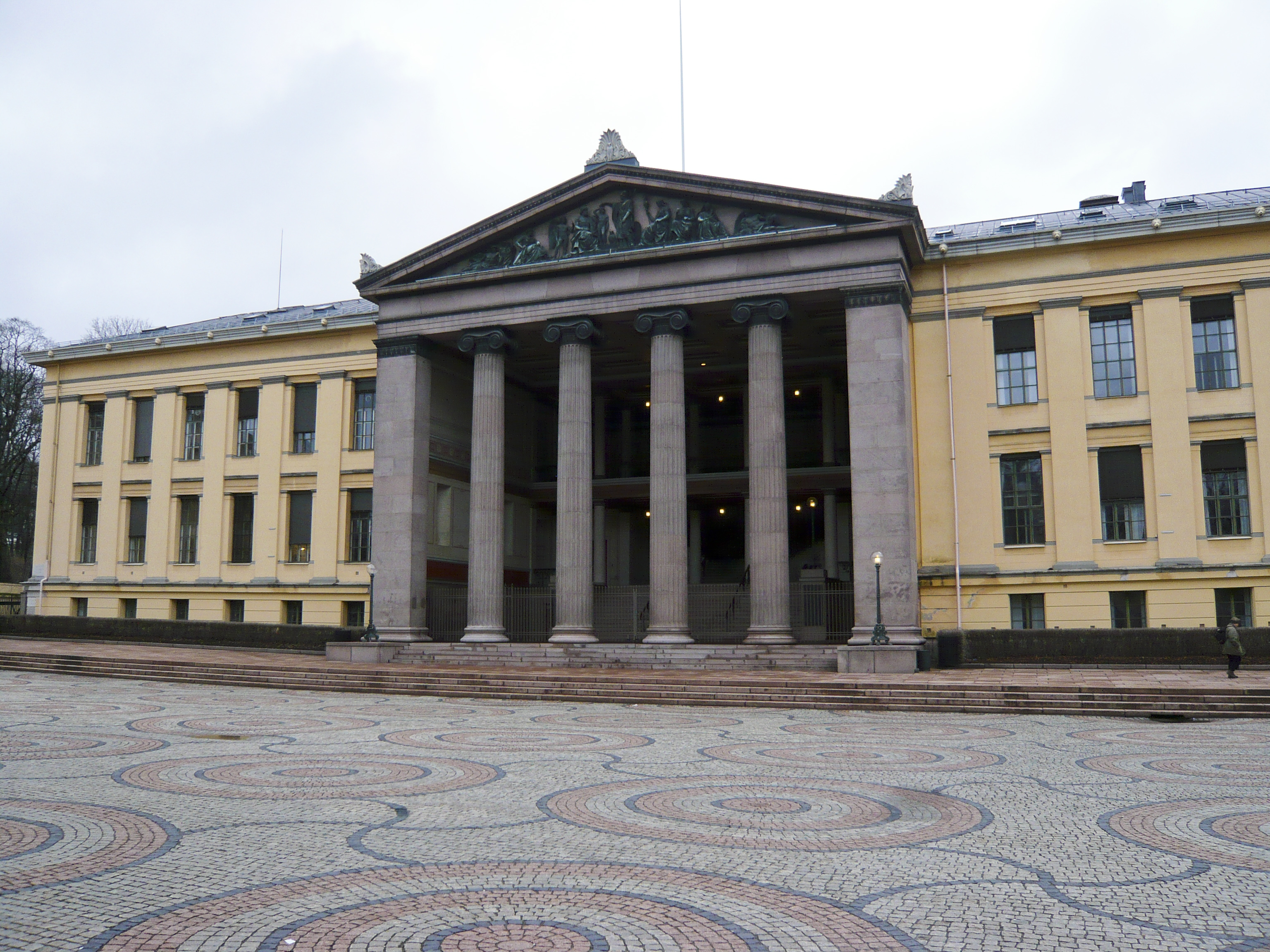
The University of Oslo, where Fogel spent her Fulbright grant.

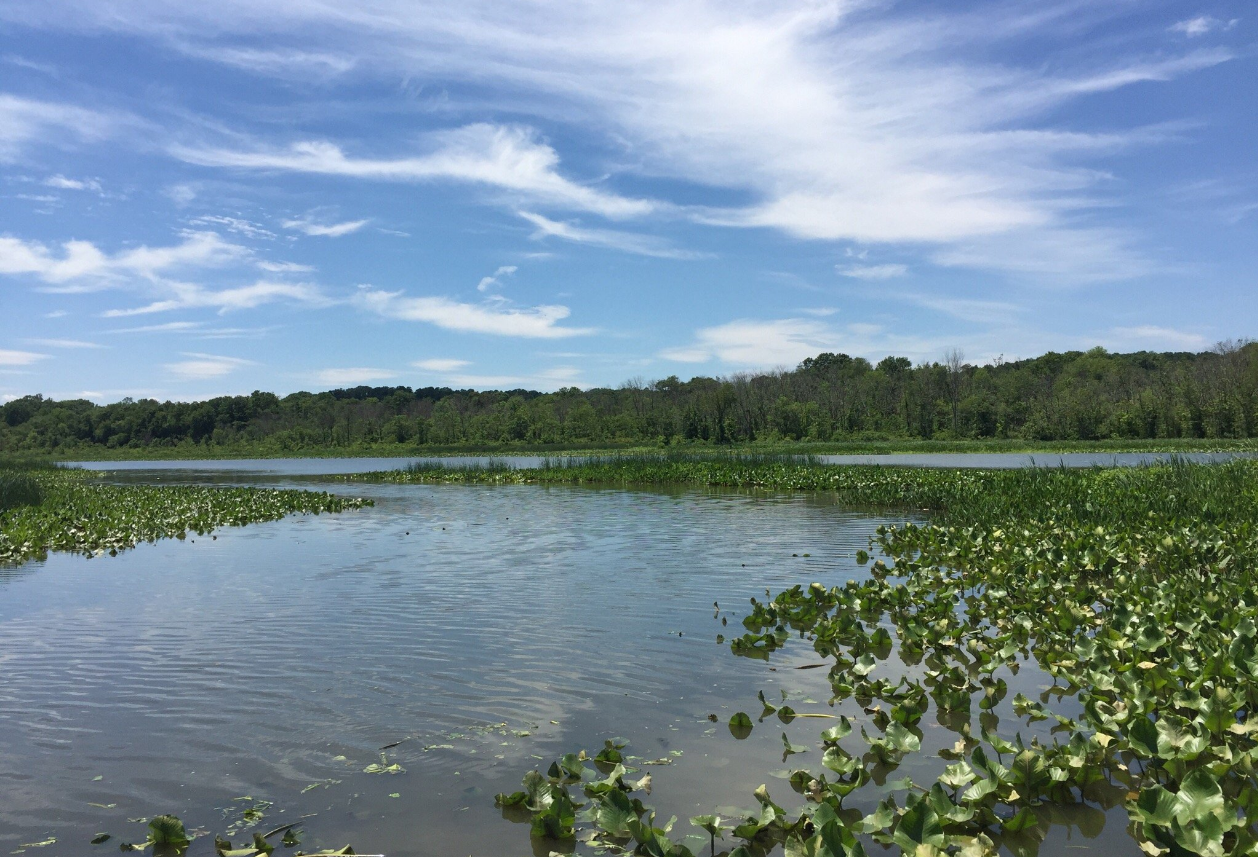
Jug Bay Wetlands Sanctuary in Lothian, Maryland

Fogel served on numerous committees, including the Scientific Advisory Committee for the Jug Bay Wetlands Sanctuary from 1992 to 2005, the Committee on Origin and Evolution of Life for the Space Studies Board, National Research Council 2000–2002, the Advisory Committee for the Carnegie Institution Department of Global Ecology from 2003 to 2005, and the AGU Biogeosciences Fellows Selection Committee in 2013 and 2014. In 2003, she was elected a Fellow of the Geochemical Society and European Association of Geochemistry. She was a Fulbright Scholar to Norway in 2006, and awarded the Jubilee Medal of the Geological Society of South Africa in 2006. She served as the National Science Foundation Director of Geobiology and Low Temperature Geochemistry from 2009 to 2010. She has also received numerous fellowships including a Loeb Fellowship from 1999 to 2001, and a Mellon Fellowship from 2001 to 2003 from the Smithsonian Environmental Research Center. In 2018, Fogel was named a fellow of the American Geophysical Union.

As a member of the NASA Astrobiology Institute from 1998 to 2010, she served on the Management Team (2004 to 2008) and then as chief scientist (2008) of the Arctic Mars Analog Svalbard Expedition (AMASE).

=== Legacy ===
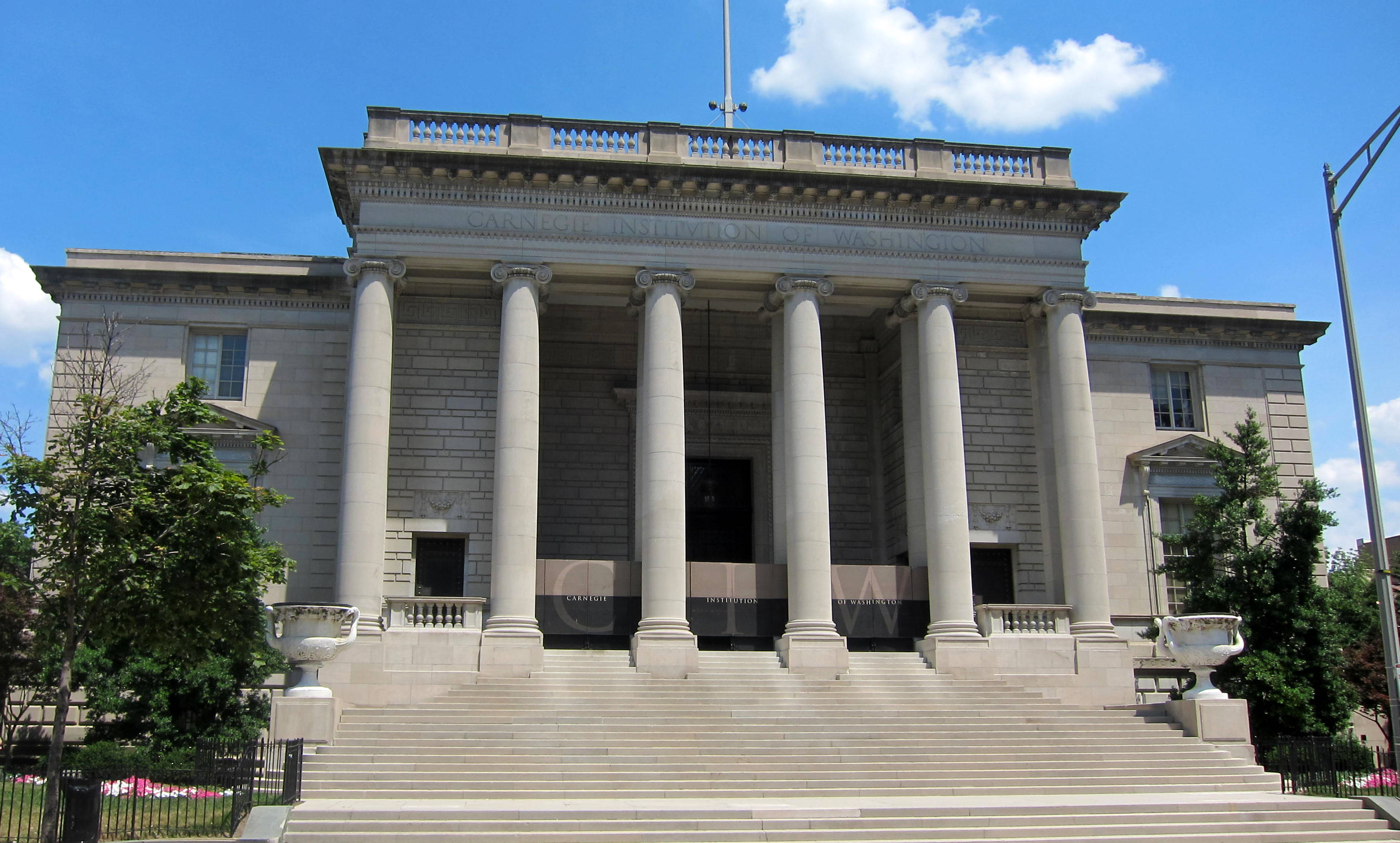
Administrative Headquarters of the Carnegie Institution for Science

Marilyn Fogel and her husband, Christopher Swarth, created several endowments to support high school and undergraduate college students. The Marilyn Fogel Endowment Fund for Internships, which is geared towards providing support for young scientists to experience research for the first time, allows high school and undergraduate students to conduct mentored internships at Carnegie's Geophysical Lab, and at the Department of Terrestrial Magnetism in Washington DC. They also endowed scholarships for undergrads at Penn State University and at the University of California, Merced.
