= Tripiti =

Tripiti or Tripti may refer to:

- Tripiti (archaeological site), in Crete, Greece
- Trypiti, a village in Milos, Greece

== People ==
- Tripti Mitra (1925–1989), Indian actress of Bengali theatre and films, wife of Sombhu Mitra
- Tripti Mukherjee, Indian classical vocalist of the Mewati gharana
- Tripti Dimri (born 1994), Indian actress in Hindi cinema
- Tripti Nadakar, Indian actress in Nepali cinema
- Tripti Bhattacharya, Indian-American paleoclimatologist

== See also ==
- Trupti, Indian name, alternative transcription of Tripti
