= Lisa Pratt =

Astrobiologist

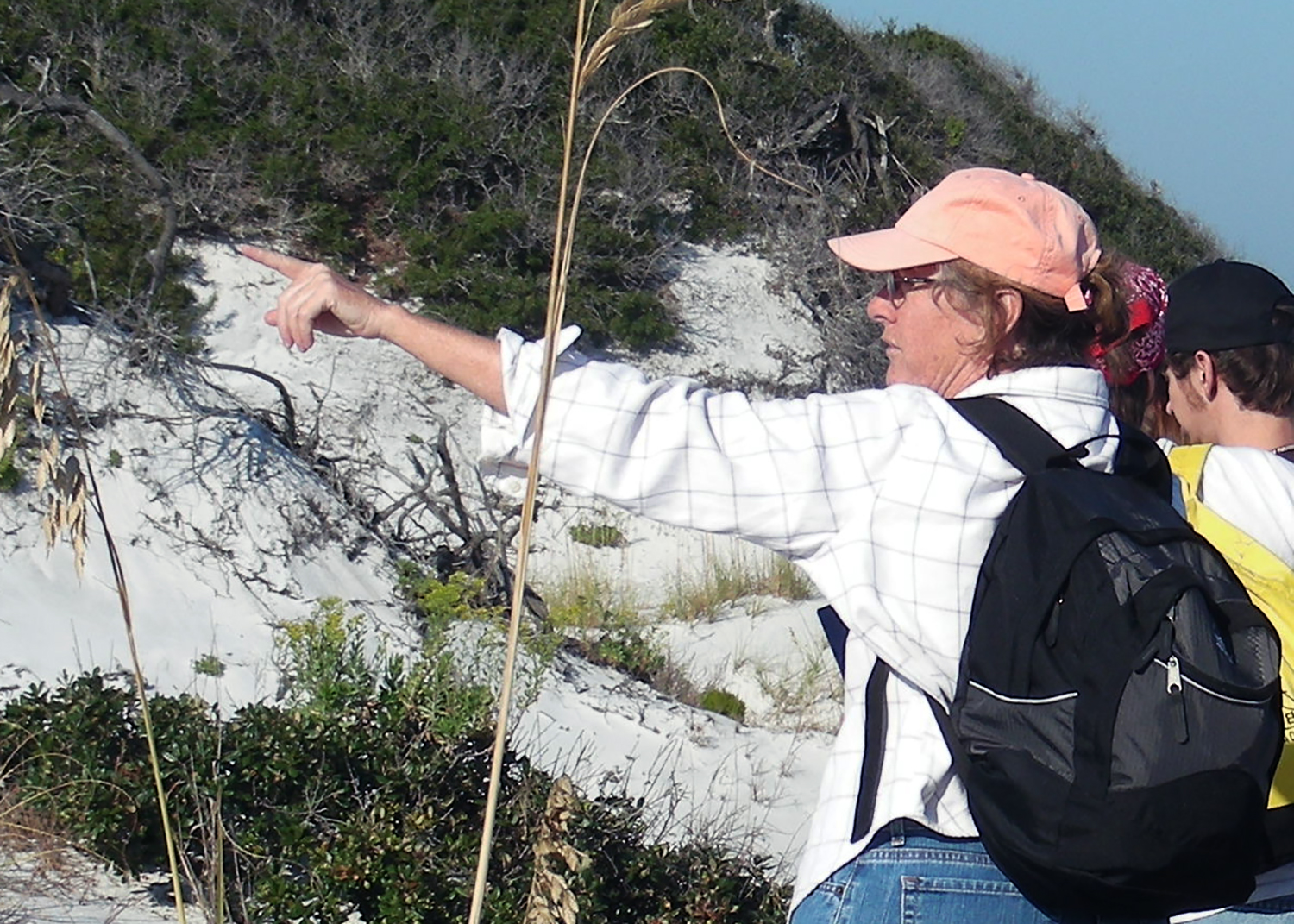
- Pratt teaching a geology field course in 2007

7th NASA Planetary Protection Officer
- In office February 5, 2018 – June 6, 2021
- President: Donald Trump; Joe Biden
- Preceded by: Catharine Conley
- Succeeded by: J. Nick Benardini

Personal details
- Born: Rochester, Minnesota, U.S.
- Spouse: Bruce Douglas
- Education: University of North Carolina; University of Illinois; Princeton University
- Occupation: Planetary Protection Officer at NASA
- Scientific career
- Fields: Astrobiology, Biogeochemistry, Organic geochemistry, Petroleum geochemistry
- Workplaces: USGS; Indiana University; NASA
- Thesis: A paleo-oceanographic interpretation of the sedimentary structures, clay minerals, and organic matter in a core of the Middle Cretaceous Greenhorn Formation drilled near Pueblo Colorado (1982)
- Notable students: Jennifer Eigenbrode

Lisa Pratt is an American biogeochemist and astrobiologist who served as the 7th Planetary Protection Officer for NASA from 2018 to 2021 under President Donald Trump. Her academic work as a student, professor, and researcher on organisms and their respective environments prepared her for the position, in which she was responsible for protecting Earth and other planets in the solar system from traveling microbes. She is a Provost Professor Emeritus of Earth and Atmospheric Sciences for Indiana University Bloomington.

== Early life and education ==
Lisa Pratt was born and raised in Rochester, Minnesota. At her high school in Minnesota, Pratt took science courses up until her senior year. When she began college, she was determined not to pursue a degree in science because she felt women were not welcome in the field. Her father had been a surgeon at the Mayo Clinic, and she noted that none of his peers were female-identifying. Pratt first began her undergraduate education at Rollins College studying Spanish. However, she later transferred to University of North Carolina, where she began studying botany.

Pratt received her Bachelor's of Arts in botany from the University of North Carolina in 1972. In 1974, she received her Masters of Science from the University of Illinois in Botany. Pratt later entered the field of geology by earning her Masters of Science from the University of North Carolina in 1978 and her Doctorate from Princeton University in 1982.

== Academic career ==
Pratt held a post-doctoral fellowship for two years at the U.S. Geological Survey in Denver and stayed on for an additional five years as a Research Geologist in the U.S.G.S. Branch of Petroleum Geology before leaving Colorado for a junior professorship in biogeochemistry at Indiana University in 1987 to help train young scientists for careers in the petroleum exploration and extraction industry.

Pratt is a Provost Professor Emeritus of Earth and Atmospheric Sciences for Indiana University Bloomington where she has been a faculty member since 1987. Since joining Indiana University's faculty, Pratt has focused her research on how extreme environments effect the microorganisms within them.

== Projects ==
When Pratt was a doctoral student, her work focused on the periods of time when Earth's oceans were starved for oxygen, which led to oceanic anoxic events that led to the creation of black sediment deposits. She looked at the geological record to better understand what had taken place millions of years ago. Later, as Pratt was completing her post-doctoral work at the U.S. Geological Survey in Denver, she studied microorganisms in the extreme heat of active African gold mines. This led to NASA looking to bring Pratt in to help study the microorganisms effected on their future projects. In 2011, she received a $2.4 million grant from NASA's Astrobiology Science and Technology for Exploring Planets program to study microorganisms on the Greenland Ice Sheet.

While Pratt has been a faculty member for Indiana University at Bloomington since 1987, she has a history of working with NASA since the early 2000s. She served as a team director at the NASA Astrobiology Institute from 2003 to 2008. Pratt also served as a chair for NASA's Mars Exploration Program Analysis from 2013 to 2016, and serves as a chair for the Return Sample Science Board for the Mars 2020 Rover mission.

In June 2017, the application for the position of Planetary Protection Officer was posted, but Pratt was hesitant to apply. She says that encouragement from her daughter led to her submitting her name, and on February 5, 2018, Pratt became the Planetary Protection Officer for NASA, leaving her role as Indiana University's College of Arts and Sciences dean. She was one of a rumored 1,400 applicants vying for the position. She had two responsibilities at NASA: protecting the Earth in event of extraterrestrial involvement, and ensuring that Earth's microbes do not travel and impact other planets in the Solar System. Her research at NASA focused on the developing the tools and techniques needed to avoid organic-constituent and biological contamination during either human or robotic missions. Additionally, Pratt was responsible for updating planetary policies in response to changing federal legislation.

In May 2021, President Biden announced the appointment of J. Nick Benardini to replace Pratt as Planetary Protection Officer effective the following month.

== Awards and honors ==
- National Research Council Post-Doctoral Fellow 1982–1984
- Matson Award American Association of Petroleum Geologist, 1986
- Distinguished Lecturer, American Association Petroleum Geologists, 1990–1991
- Association of Women Geoscientists, Outstanding Educator, 1997
- American Association of Petroleum Geologists, Eastern Section, Outstanding Educator, 2002
- Indiana University College of Arts and Sciences Alumni, Distinguished Faculty Member, 2003
- Phi Beta Kappa Visiting Scholar, 2009–2011
- Fellow Geological Society of America, 2010
- Phi Beta Kappa Triennial Council Meeting, featured lecture, 2012
- President's Medal for Excellence at Indiana University (2018)
- Bicentennial Medal at Indiana University (2020)

Government offices
Preceded by Catharine Conley	7th NASA Planetary Protection Officer; 2018 – 2021	Succeeded by J. Nick Benardini
