= John M. Hayes (scientist) =

American oceanographer (1940–2017)

John M. Hayes ForMemRS
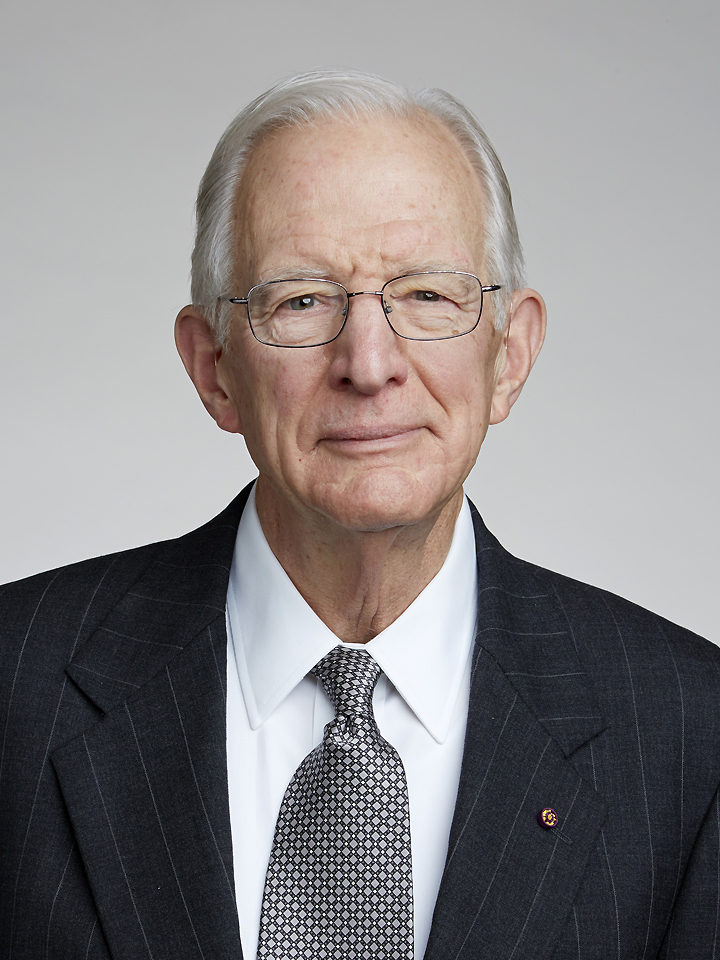
- Hayes in 2016
- Born: September 6, 1940; Seattle, Washington, U.S.
- Died: February 3, 2017 (aged 76); Berkeley, California, U.S.
- Education: Iowa State University; Massachusetts Institute of Technology
- Awards: Urey Medal (1997); V. M. Goldschmidt Award (2002)
- Scientific career
- Fields: Biogeochemistry; Mass spectrometry
- Workplaces: Indiana University Bloomington; Woods Hole Oceanographic Institution; Harvard University
- Thesis: Techniques for high resolution mass spectrometric analysis of organic constituents of terrestrial and extraterrestrial samples (1966)
- Doctoral advisor: Klaus Biemann
- Doctoral students: Katherine H. Freeman
- Other notable students: Daniel P. Schrag (post doc)
- Website: www.whoi.edu/profile/jhayes/

John Michael Hayes ForMemRS (September 6, 1940 – February 3, 2017) was an American oceanographer. He worked at Indiana University Bloomington, and Woods Hole Oceanographic Institution in Woods Hole, Massachusetts.

== Education ==
Hayes was educated at Iowa State University graduating with a Bachelor of Science degree in chemistry in 1962. He completed his postgraduate education in analytical chemistry at the Massachusetts Institute of Technology (MIT) where he was awarded a PhD in 1966 for analysis of organic constituents of terrestrial and extraterrestrial samples using mass spectrometry while under the supervision of Klaus Biemann.

== Career and research ==
Hayes made the first measurements of the distribution of the isotopes of carbon within biolipids. This innovation provided a foundation for new studies of the pathways of carbon in natural environments, both modern and ancient.

Because the production of organic matter requires concomitant production of oxygen or some other oxidized product, Hayes's studies of the carbon cycle bear strongly on the development of the global environment and provide evidence about the timing of evolutionary events such as the development of O_{2}-producing photosynthesis.

For 26 years he was a professor in the departments of chemistry and geology at Indiana University Bloomington, then moved to Woods Hole Oceanographic Institution. During his career he has held academic appointments at Harvard University, the University of California, Los Angeles and the University of California, Berkeley.

== Death ==
Hayes died on February 3, 2017, at his home in Berkeley, California, from pulmonary fibrosis at age 76.

== Awards and honours ==
Hayes was elected a member of the National Academy of Sciences of the United States in 1998 and received the Alfred E. Treibs Award and V. M. Goldschmidt Award from the Geochemical Society in 1998 and 2002, respectively. With Geoffrey Eglinton he was awarded the Urey Medal from the European Association for Geochemistry in 1997. He was elected a Foreign Member of the Royal Society (ForMemRS) in 2016.

== Tributes ==
Beginning in 2019, the Organic Geochemistry Division of the Geochemical Society is given an annual award in Hayes's name to a mid-career scientist for outstanding accomplishments that draw together multiple fields of investigation to advance biogeochemical science.
