= Katherine H. Freeman =

American earth scientist

- Born: Katherine Haines Freeman
- Education: Wellesley College; Indiana University, Bloomington
- Scientific career
- Workplaces: Pennsylvania State University
- Thesis: The carbon isotopic compositions of individual compounds from ancient and modern depositional environments (1991)
- Doctoral advisor: John M. Hayes
- Doctoral students: Jennifer Eigenbrode
- Other notable students: Post-docs: Yongsong Huang
- Website: www.geosc.psu.edu/academic-faculty/freeman-katherine

Katherine Haines Freeman is the Evan Pugh University Professor of Geosciences at Pennsylvania State University and a co-editor of the peer-reviewed scientific journal, Annual Review of Earth and Planetary Sciences. Her research interests are organic geochemistry, isotopic biogeochemistry, paleoclimate and astrobiology.

== Academic background ==
In 1984 Wellesley College awarded Freeman her B.A. in geology and classical civilization. At Indiana University, Bloomington she obtained her M.S. (1989) and Ph.D. (1991) in geology under the direction of John M. Hayes. Freeman then did a postdoc at the Skidaway Institute of Oceanography (Savannah, Georgia) in 1990-91, and subsequently joined Pennsylvania State University in 1991. Freeman was appointed a Distinguished Professor in 2015 and later an Evan Pugh University Professor in 2016 by Penn State. An Evan Pugh University professorship is the highest honor that Pennsylvania State University can bestowed on a member of its faculty.

== Awards ==
Freeman is a fellow of the American Geophysical Union (2013), The Geochemical Society and European Association of Geochemistry (2011), American Academy of Microbiology (2011), John Simon Guggenheim Memorial Foundation (2010), Geological Society of America (2007), and Canadian Institute for Advanced Research (2001). She was awarded the Heinz A. Lowenstam Science Innovation Award in 2012 from the European Association of Geochemistry. Her paper titled "Water, plants, and early human habitats in eastern Africa" earned the 2012 Cozzarelli Prize for Physical and Mathematical Sciences. She was elected to membership in the National Academy of Sciences in 2013. She received the 2017 Alfred Treibs Award from the Geochemical Society for her contributions to organic geochemistry. Freeman was also awarded the Nemmers Prize in Earth Sciences in 2020 for her significant contributions to the field of stable isotope geochemistry.
