= Center for Climate and Life =

US Climate Change organization

- Purpose: Understanding how climate impacts the security of food, water, and shelter; exploring sustainable energy solutions.
- Location: Palisades, New York
- Key people: Peter B. de Menocal, Director
- Affiliations: Lamont–Doherty Earth Observatory, Columbia University
- Website: climateandlife.columbia.edu

The Center for Climate and Life was a multidisciplinary climate science research initiative based at Lamont–Doherty Earth Observatory (LDEO), a research unit of Columbia University. Center research focused on how climate change affects access to basic resources such as food, water, shelter and energy. The center's founder and former director is Peter B. de Menocal, a paleoclimatologist and Columbia University dean of science in the faculty of arts and sciences. In 2020, Columbia University retired the Center for Climate and Life initiative.

== History ==
Columbia University provided the Center for Climate and Life an initial budget of $3.1 million for its first five years of operation.

The center aimed to engage corporate philanthropists to support its research initiatives. Through private funding and partnerships, it aimed to build an endowment to distribute annual grants to center scientists.

In April 2016, the Center for Climate and Life partnered with the World Surf League (WSL). The philanthropic arm of the organization, WSL PURE, contributed $1.5 million to the center to fund five research projects on the topics of ocean health and ecosystems, ocean acidification, sea-level rise, and the role the oceans play in climate change.

== Areas of emphasis ==
Center for Climate and Life initiatives focused on five areas:

- Food security
- Water availability
- Shelter
- Sustainable energy solutions
- Ocean health

== Research and education initiatives ==
Research by Center for Climate and Life scientists was focused on understanding how climate change will affect people and the basic resources and ecosystems that sustain them. Center activities addressed the widening "climate innovation gap" between the increasing need for knowledge and solutions, and declining federal support for climate and solutions research.

The center worked with public and private sector partners to help stakeholders understand how climate-related impacts on essential resources will affect their bottom line and thereby guide rational business and policy decisions.

The center supported Climate and Life Fellows, who led research projects on topics central to its mission. In 2016, the center administered its first two grants to early career scientists: hydrologist Michael Puma of Columbia University's Center for Climate Systems Research and NASA's Goddard Institute for Space Studies received a $190,000 grant to study the impact of climate change on global food systems, and bioclimatologist A. Park Williams of LDEO received a grant of $180,000 for his research on historical drought and fire cycles.

Peter de Menocal, the center's former director, sought to encourage climate action by talking about climate change in terms of how it will impact human sustainability.

== See also ==
- Wet-bulb conditions
