= J. Nick Benardini =

American astrobiologist

James Nick Benardini

8th NASA Planetary Protection Officer
- Incumbent
- Assumed office June 7, 2021
- President: Joe Biden; Donald Trump
- Preceded by: Lisa Pratt

Personal details
- Education: University of Arizona; University of Idaho
- Occupation: Planetary Protection Officer at NASA
- Scientific career
- Fields: Astrobiology, Microbiology
- Workplaces: NASA
- Thesis: Microbiology of aquatic environments: Characterizations of the microbiotas of municipal water supplies, the International Space Station Internal Active Thermal Control System's heat transport fluid, and US space shuttle drinking water (2007)
- Doctoral advisor: Ronald L. Crawford

James Nick Benardini is an American microbiologist who serves as the 8th and current Planetary Protection Officer for NASA since 2021. He has a Bachelor of Science in microbiology from the University of Arizona and a PhD in microbiology, molecular biology and biochemistry from the University of Idaho. In 2016, he won the Presidential Early Career Award for Scientists and Engineers for his contributions to planetary protection at NASA's Jet Propulsion Laboratory in California. His research is focused on microbiological detection and ecology in extreme environments, such as Mars. He is the lead for the lab team in charge of sampling for the InSight 2016 and Mars 2020 missions.

Government offices
Preceded by Lisa Pratt	8th NASA Planetary Protection Officer; 2021–present	Incumbent
