= Jennifer Eigenbrode =

American astrobiologist

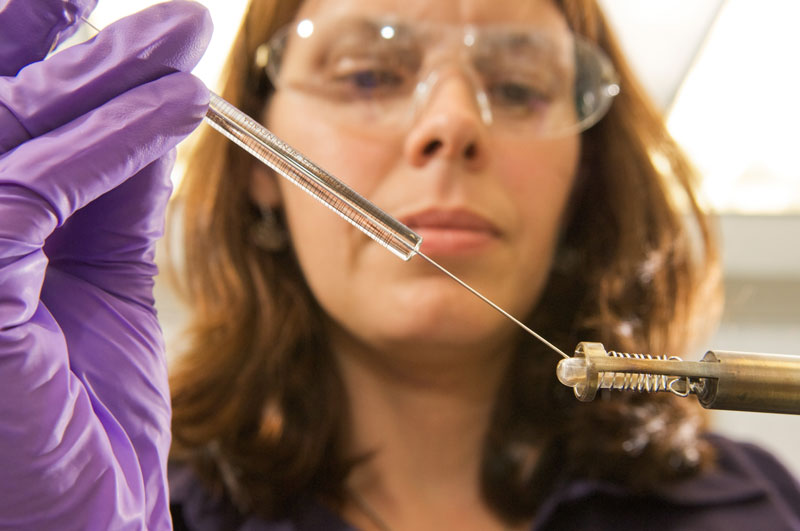
- Eigenbrode injecting a chemical into a rock sample in 2011
- Education: James Madison University (BS); Indiana University (MS); Pennsylvania State University (PhD)
- Scientific career
- Workplaces: Goddard Space Flight Center
- Thesis: Late Archean microbial ecology: An integration of molecular, isotopic, and lithologic studies (2004)
- Doctoral advisor: Katherine Freeman
- Other academic advisors: Lisa Pratt (MS advisor); Marilyn Fogel (post-doc advisor)

Jennifer Eigenbrode is an interdisciplinary astrobiologist who works at NASA's Goddard Space Flight Center. She specializes in organic chemistry, geology, and organic bio-geochemistry of Martian and ocean-world environments.

== Early life and education ==
Eigenbrode's inherent curiosity, as well as being in a family of engineers and technicians, stimulated her enjoyment of science. Geology in particular interested her and she became a "professional geology student".

Eigenbrode obtained her B.S. in geology from James Madison University in Virginia. Her senior thesis explored the clay mineralogy of river terrace soils in Virginia. Her master's degree was obtained from Indiana University Bloomington and focused on geological sciences while working under the direction of Lisa Pratt. Her Ph.D. was obtained at Pennsylvania State University where her dissertation topic was "Late Archean microbial ecology: an integration of molecular isotopic, and lithologic records" while working under the direction of Katherine Freeman. Following her Ph.D., Eigenbrode was a postdoctoral fellow at the Carnegie Institution of Washington from 2004 until 2007 working under the direction of Marilyn Fogel. In 2007 she accepted a position at the National Aeronautic and Space Administration as a space scientist.

== Research ==
Eigenbrode's early research was on the Earth's atmosphere during the Archean era where she examined organic carbon, sulfur, and the origin of aerobic ecosystems. She then moved on to examining organic compounds found in Neoarchaean rocks, establishing field methods to prepare samples for analysis, and developing methods to preserve samples from Mars in a manner that allows investigation of biosignatures.

Her current research focuses on Mars, and uses samples collected by the rover Curiosity which she uses to search for signals of life on Mars. She received NASA's Internal Research and Development (IRAD) Innovator of the Year award in 2009 for her work on a sample preparation module needed to collect samples from Mars. She is a part of the team working on samples from Mars including gases and soils, and radiation on the planet. She was lead author on a paper examining organic matter within the samples from Mars, research that used the SAM instrument (Sample Analysis at Mars) to burn samples collected from the surface of Mars and examined the resulting gas to determine the composition of the samples. Eigenbrode is also establishing the groundwork to use the CheMin (Chemistry and Mineralogy) instrument on Curiosity to detect organic salts in the Mars samples.

== Selected publications ==
- Eigenbrode, Jennifer L.; Freeman, Katherine H. (24 October 2006). "Late Archean rise of aerobic microbial ecosystems". Proceedings of the National Academy of Sciences. 103 (43): 15759–15764. Bibcode:2006PNAS..10315759E. doi:10.1073/pnas.0607540103. ISSN 0027-8424. PMC 1635076. PMID 17043234.
- Ono, Shuhei; Eigenbrode, Jennifer L.; Pavlov, Alexander A.; Kharecha, Pushker; Rumble, Douglas; Kasting, James F.; Freeman, Katherine H. (1 August 2003). "New insights into Archean sulfur cycle from mass-independent sulfur isotope records from the Hamersley Basin, Australia". Earth and Planetary Science Letters. 213 (1): 15–30. Bibcode:2003E&PSL.213...15O. doi:10.1016/S0012-821X(03)00295-4. ISSN 0012-821X.
- Eigenbrode, Jennifer L.; Summons, Roger E.; Steele, Andrew; Freissinet, Caroline; Millan, Maëva; Navarro-González, Rafael; Sutter, Brad; McAdam, Amy C.; Franz, Heather B.; Glavin, Daniel P.; Archer, Paul D.; Mahaffy, Paul R.; Conrad, Pamela G.; Hurowitz, Joel A.; Grotzinger, John P.; Gupta, Sanjeev; Ming, Doug W.; Sumner, Dawn Y.; Szopa, Cyril; Malespin, Charles; Buch, Arnaud; Coll, Patrice (8 June 2018). "Organic matter preserved in 3-billion-year-old mudstones at Gale crater, Mars". Science. 360 (6393): 1096–1101. Bibcode:2018Sci...360.1096E. doi:10.1126/science.aas9185. hdl:10044/1/60810. PMID 29880683. S2CID 46983230.

== Awards and honors ==
- Philips Cosminski Award, James Madison University, 1994
- Geological Society of America Outstanding Student Research Award, 1997
- NASA Goddard Innovator of the Year Award, 2009
- Goddard Space Flight Center Honor Award - New Opportunities Captured Team, award to the Enceladus Life Signature and Habitability (ELSAH) Mission Team, 2018
- Goddard Space Flight Center Honor Award for Science, 2018
- Pennsylvania State University 125th Anniversary fellow of the College of Earth and Mineral Sciences
