= James M. Russell =

American paleoclimatologist, climatologist and academic

- Education: Wesleyan University (BA); University of Minnesota (PhD)
- Scientific career
- Fields: Paleoclimatology, climatology
- Workplaces: University of Minnesota Duluth; Brown University
- Thesis: The Holocene Paleolimnology and Paleoclimatology of Lake Edward, Uganda-Congo (2004)
- Doctoral advisor: Thomas C. Johnson

James Michael Russell is an American paleoclimatologist and climatologist. He is a professor of Earth, environmental, and planetary sciences and is currently the senior associate dean of dean of faculty at Brown University. Russell researches the climate, paleoclimate, and limnology.

== Education ==
Russell received a B.A. in Earth and Environmental Science from Wesleyan University in 1998. Russell then worked as a Junior Scientist at the Limnological Research Center at the University of Minnesota for one year before beginning his Ph.D. in ecology at the University of Minnesota. Russell's doctoral advisor was Thomas C. Johnson. Russell's dissertation in 2004 was titled The Holocene Paleolimnology and Paleoclimatology of Lake Edward, Uganda-Congo.

== Career and research ==
Russell is a paleoclimatologist and climatologist. After graduating from the University of Minnesota, Russell joined the Large Lakes Observatory at the University of Minnesota Duluth. In 2006, Russell joined the faculty of Brown University, where he was awarded tenure and the Royce Family Professorship of Teaching Excellence, in recognition of his teaching ability in 2018. He was awarded the AGU Willi Dansgaard Award in 2020.

Russell's primary fields are paleoclimatology, paleolimnology, and paleoecology. He is particularly well known for his work reconstructing climates from Tropical lake sediments.

According to Scopus, he has published 113 research articles so far with 37366 citations and has an H-index of 32.

=== Editorial activities ===
- 2017–2020: Associate Editor for Paleoceanography and Paleoclimatology.
- 2016–present: Editorial board member for Quaternary International.

=== Academic honors ===
- 2008–2011: Joukowsky Family Assistant Professorship in Geological Sciences.
- 2013–present: Chairman of the Board of Directors, Drilling, Observation, and Sampling of the Earth's Continental Crust (DOSECC).

=== Notable Student and Postdoctoral Advisees ===
==== Postdocs ====
- Jacquelyn Gill (2012–2013)
- Sarah Ivory (2014–2016)
- Sylvia G. Dee (2015–2017)

==== Students ====
- Jessica Tierney (Ph.D. 2010)
- Shannon Loomis (Ph.D. 2013)
- Bronwen Konecky (Ph.D. 2013)
- Jessica Rodysill (Ph.D. 2013)
- Satrio Wicaksono (Ph.D. 2016)
- William C. Daniels (Ph.D. 2017)
- Rachel Lupien (Ph.D. 2019)
- Nora Richter (Ph.D. 2020)
- Richard Vachula (Ph.D. 2020)
- Sloane Garelick (Ph.D. 2022)

== Selected works ==
=== Books ===
- Climate-Driven Ecosystem Succession in the Sahara: the past 6000 years.

=== Journal articles ===
- Climate-driven ecosystem succession in the Sahara: the past 6000 years.
- Northern hemisphere controls on tropical southeast African climate during the past 60,000 years.
- Classification of lacustrine sediments based on sedimentary components.
