= Goddard Space Flight Center =

NASA research facility in Maryland

NASA Goddard Space Flight Center

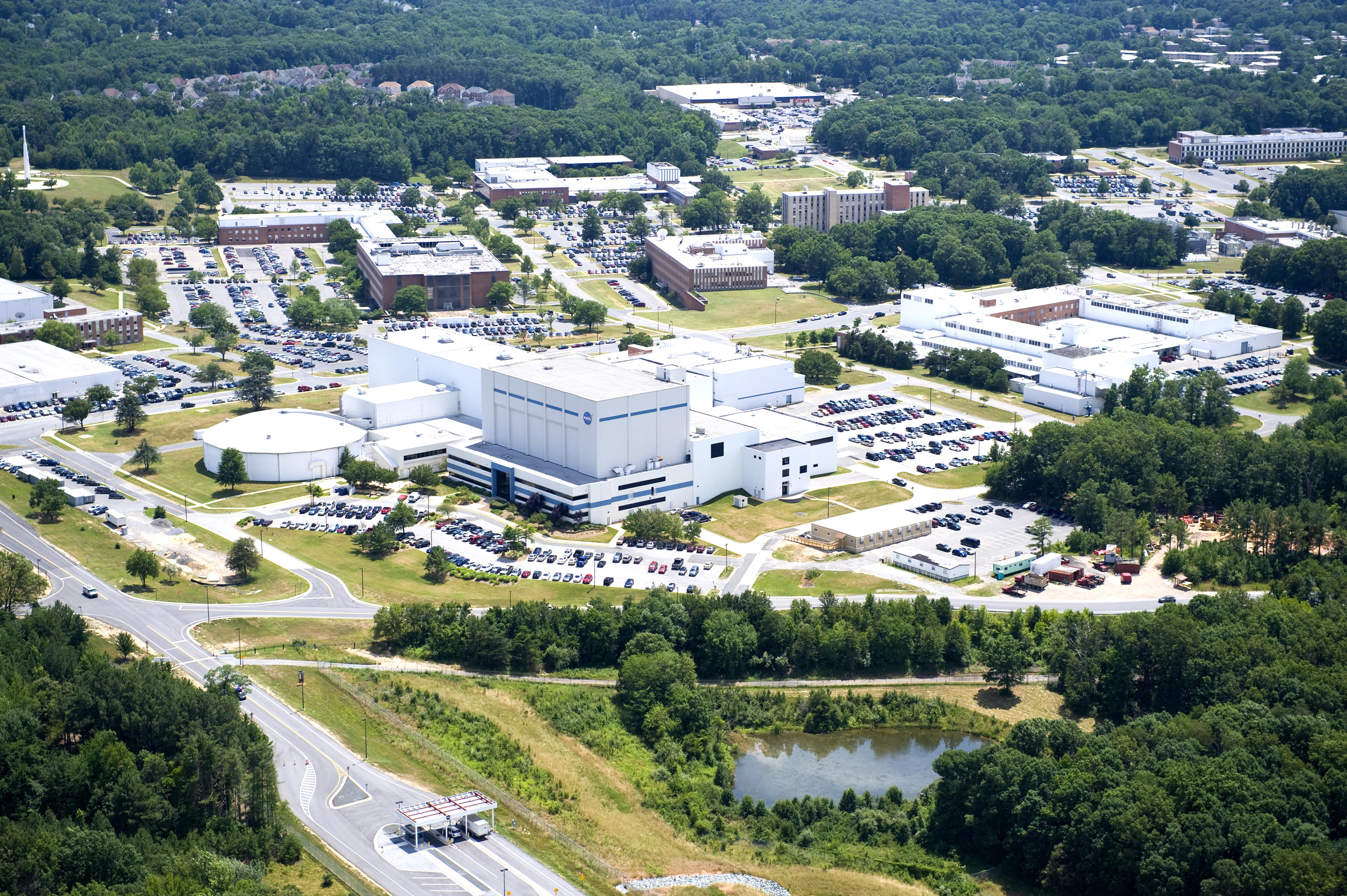
- Aerial view of Goddard Space Flight Center (2010)

Agency overview
- Formed: May 1, 1959; 67 years ago
- Preceding agency: Beltsville Space Center
- Jurisdiction: Federal government of the United States
- Headquarters: Greenbelt, Maryland, United States; 38°59′32″N 76°51′9″W
- Employees: 10,000 civil service and contractors
- Agency executive: Jamie Dunn, director
- Parent agency: NASA
- Child agencies: Wallops Flight Facility; Goddard Institute for Space Studies; Katherine Johnson Independent Verification and Validation Facility
- Website: nasa.gov/goddard/

Map
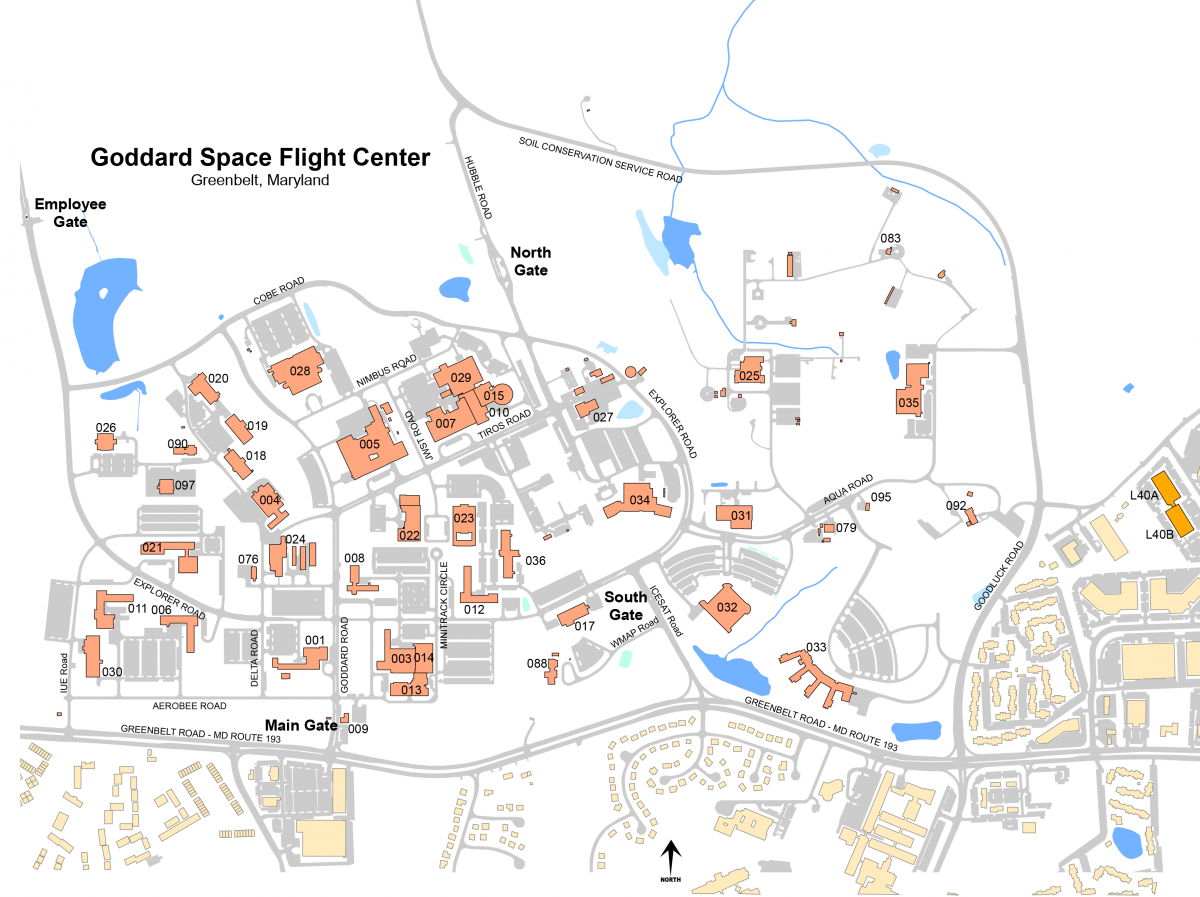
- Goddard map

The Goddard Space Flight Center (GSFC) is a major NASA space research laboratory located approximately 6.5 miles (10.5 km) northeast of Washington, D.C., in Greenbelt, Maryland, United States. Established on May 1, 1959, as NASA's first space flight center, GSFC employs about 10,000 civil servants and contractors. Named for American rocket propulsion pioneer Robert H. Goddard, it is one of ten major NASA field centers. Partially within the unincorporated community of Goddard, GSFC has a Greenbelt mailing address.

GSFC is the largest combined organization of scientists and engineers in the United States dedicated to increasing knowledge of the Earth, the Solar System, and the universe via observations from space. GSFC is a major US laboratory for developing and operating uncrewed scientific spacecraft. GSFC conducts scientific investigation, development, manufacturing and operation of space systems, and development of related technologies. Goddard scientists can develop and support a mission, and Goddard engineers and technicians can design and build the spacecraft for that mission. Goddard scientist John C. Mather shared the 2006 Nobel Prize in Physics for his work on COBE.

GSFC also operates two spaceflight tracking and data acquisition networks (the Space Network and the Near Earth Network), develops and maintains advanced space and Earth science data information systems, and develops satellite systems for the National Oceanic and Atmospheric Administration (NOAA).

GSFC manages operations for many NASA and international missions including the James Webb Space Telescope (JWST) and Hubble Space Telescope (HST), the Explorers Program, the Discovery Program, the Earth Observing System (EOS), INTEGRAL, MAVEN, OSIRIS-REx, the Solar and Heliospheric Observatory (SOHO), the Solar Dynamics Observatory (SDO), Tracking and Data Relay Satellite System (TDRS), Fermi, and Swift. Past missions managed by GSFC include the Rossi X-ray Timing Explorer (RXTE), Compton Gamma Ray Observatory, SMM, COBE, IUE, and ROSAT.

== History ==
Goddard 50th anniversary logo

Founded as Beltsville Space Center, Goddard was NASA's first of four space centers. Its original charter was to perform five major functions on behalf of NASA: technology development and fabrication, planning, scientific research, technical operations, and project management. The center is organized into several directorates, each charged with one of these key functions.

On May 1, 1959, the center was renamed the Goddard Space Flight Center (GSFC) for Robert H. Goddard. Its first 157 employees transferred from the United States Navy's Project Vanguard missile program, and continued their work at the Naval Research Laboratory in Washington, D.C., while the center was under construction.

Goddard Space Flight Center contributed to Project Mercury, America's first human spaceflight program. The Center assumed a lead role for the project in its early days and managed the first 250 employees involved in the effort, who were stationed at Langley Research Center in Hampton, Virginia. However, the size and scope of Project Mercury soon prompted NASA to build a new Manned Spacecraft Center, now the Johnson Space Center, in Houston, Texas. Project Mercury's personnel and activities were transferred there in 1961.

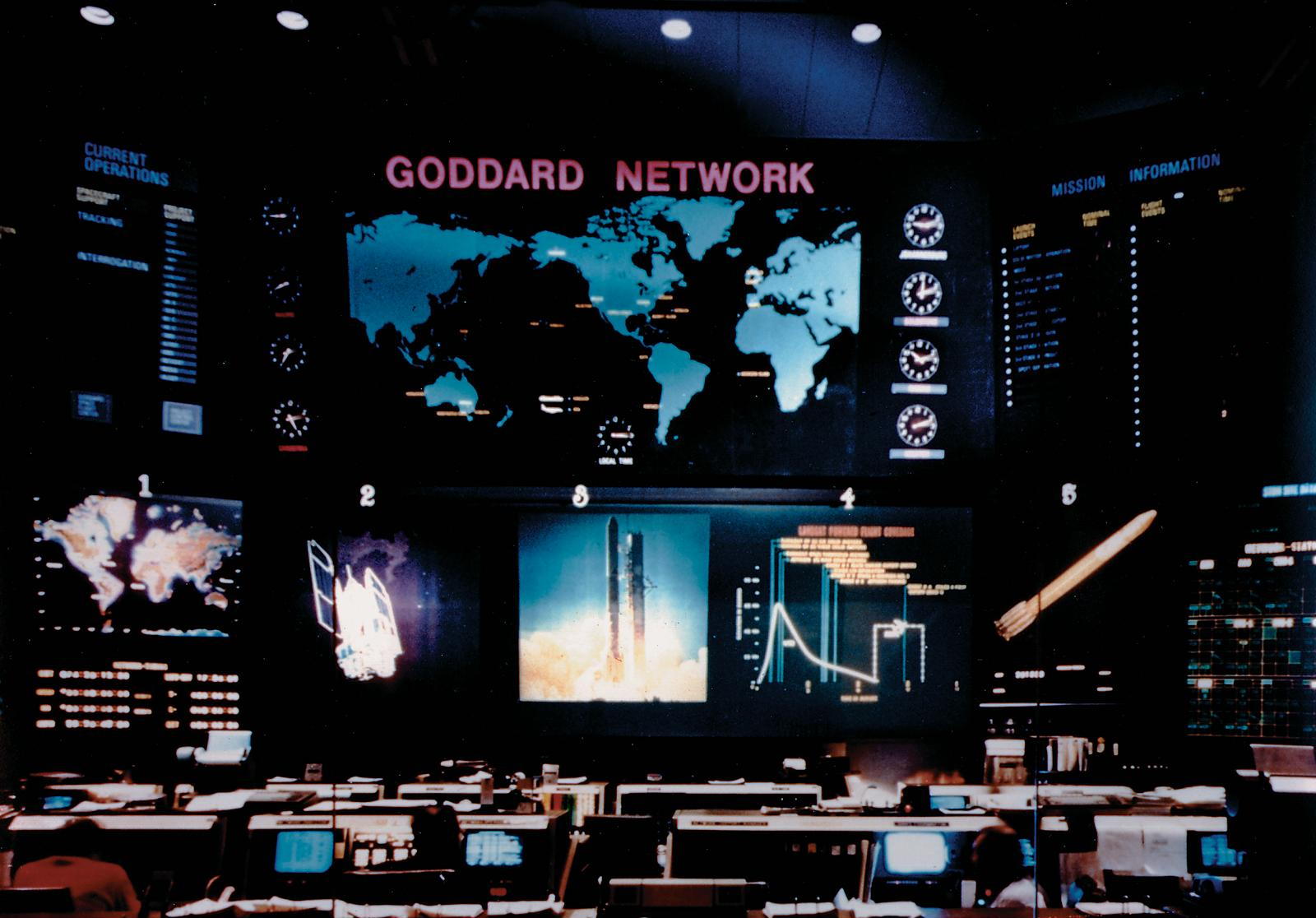
The Goddard network (STDN) tracked many early crewed and uncrewed spacecraft.

Goddard Space Flight Center remained involved in the crewed space flight program, providing computer support and radar tracking of flights through a worldwide network of ground stations called the Spacecraft Tracking and Data Acquisition Network (STDN). However, the Center focused primarily on designing uncrewed satellites and spacecraft for scientific research missions. Goddard pioneered several fields of spacecraft development, including modular spacecraft design, which reduced costs and made it possible to repair satellites in orbit. Goddard's Solar Max satellite, launched in 1980, was repaired by astronauts on the Space Shuttle Challenger in 1984. The Hubble Space Telescope, launched in 1990, remains in service and continues to grow in capability thanks to its modular design and multiple servicing missions by the Space Shuttle.

Today, the center remains involved in each of NASA's key programs. Goddard has developed more instruments for planetary exploration than any other organization, among them scientific instruments sent to every planet in the Solar System. The center's contribution to the Earth Science Enterprise includes several spacecraft in the Earth Observing System fleet as well as EOSDIS, a science data collection, processing, and distribution system. For the crewed space flight program, Goddard develops tools for use by astronauts during extra-vehicular activity, and operates the Lunar Reconnaissance Orbiter, a spacecraft designed to study the Moon in preparation for future crewed exploration.

== Missions ==
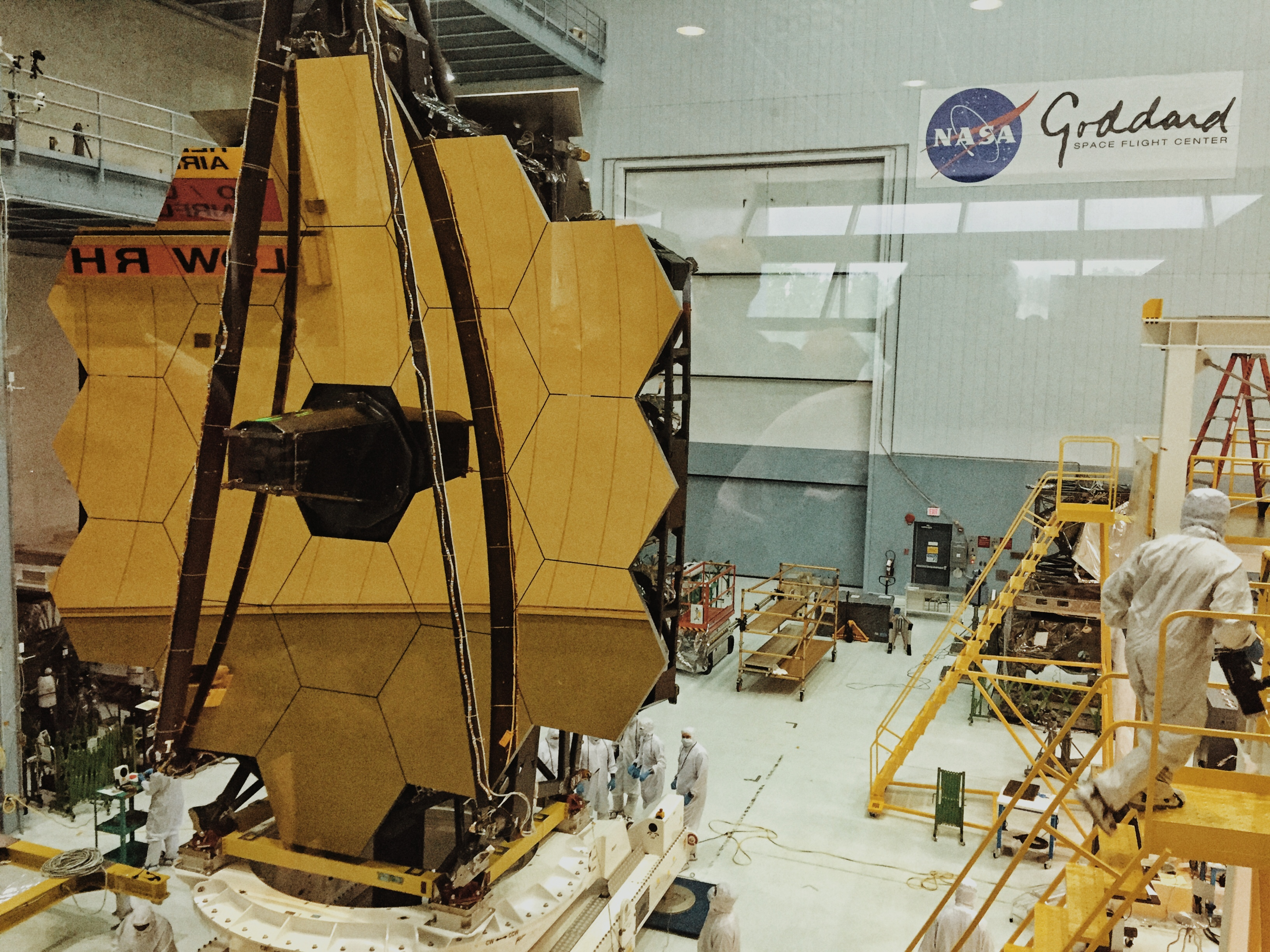
James Webb Space Telescope mirrors assembled, May 2016

=== Past ===
Goddard has been involved in designing, building, and operating spacecraft since the founding of the center in 1959. The list of these missions reflects a diverse set of scientific objectives and goals. The Landsat series of spacecraft has been studying the Earth's resources since the launch of the first mission in 1972. TIROS-1 launched in 1960 as the first success in a long series of weather satellites. The Spartan platform deployed from the space shuttle, allowing simple, low-cost 2–3 day missions. The second of NASA's Great Observatories, the Compton Gamma Ray Observatory, operated for nine years before re-entering the Earth's atmosphere in 2000. Another of Goddard's space science observatories, the Cosmic Background Explorer, provided unique scientific data about the early universe. A fact sheet highlighting many of Goddard's previous missions is recorded on a 40th anniversary webpage.

=== Present ===
Goddard currently supports the operation of dozens of spacecraft collecting scientific data. These missions include Earth science projects like the Earth Observing System (EOS) that includes the Terra, Aqua, and Aura spacecraft flying alongside several projects from other Centers or other countries. Other major Earth science projects that are currently operating include the Tropical Rainfall Measuring Mission (TRMM) and the Global Precipitation Measurement mission (GPM), missions that provide data critical to hurricane predictions. Many Goddard projects support other organizations, such as the US Geological Survey on Landsat-7 and -8, and the National Oceanic and Atmospheric Administration (NOAA) on the Geostationary Operational Environmental Satellite (GOES) system that provide weather predictions.

Other Goddard missions support a variety of space science disciplines. Goddard's most famous project is the Hubble Space Telescope, a unique science platform that has been breaking new ground in astronomy since 1990. Other missions such as the Wilkinson Microwave Anisotropy Probe (WMAP) study the structure and evolution of the universe. Other missions such as the Solar and Heliospheric Observatory (SOHO) are currently studying the Sun and how its behavior affects life on the Earth. The Lunar Reconnaissance Orbiter (LRO) is mapping out the composition and topography of the Moon and the Solar Dynamics Observatory (SDO) is tracking the Sun's energy and influence on the Earth. The OSIRIS-REx asteroid sample return mission returned a sample from asteroid 101955 Bennu in 2023 and under the name OSIRIS-APEX is headed to asteroid 99942 Apophis in 2029.

Particularly noteworthy operations include the James Webb Space Telescope, which was launched in 2022 and enables investigations across many fields of astronomy and cosmology, such as observation of the first stars and the formation of the first galaxies.

=== Future ===
The Goddard community continually works on numerous operations and projects that have launch dates ranging from the upcoming year to a decade down the road. These operations also vary in what scientists hope they will uncover. Upcoming missions include Nancy Grace Roman Space Telescope, Dragonfly, and DAVINCI.

== Science ==
In this video, two Goddard technologists explain what innovation means and why it is so important to NASA.

=== Addressing scientific questions ===
NASA's missions (and therefore Goddard's missions) address a broad range of scientific questions generally classified around four key areas: Earth sciences, astrophysics, heliophysics, and the Solar System. To simplify, Goddard studies Earth and Space.

Within the Earth sciences area, Goddard plays a major role in research to advance understanding the Earth as an environmental system, looking at questions related to how the components of that environmental system have developed, how they interact, and how they evolve, in order to allow scientists to understand the practical impacts of natural and human activities during the coming decades and centuries.

Within Space Sciences, Goddard has distinguished itself with the 2006 Nobel Physics Prize given to John Mather and the COBE mission. Beyond the COBE mission, Goddard studies how the universe formed, what it is made of, how its components interact, and how it evolves. The center also contributes to research seeking to understand how stars and planetary systems form and evolve and studies the nature of the Sun's interaction with its surroundings.

=== From scientific questions to science missions ===
Based on existing knowledge accumulated through previous missions, new science questions are articulated. Missions are developed in the same way an experiment would be developed using the scientific method. In this context, Goddard does not work as an independent entity but rather as one of the 10 NASA centers working together to find answers to these scientific questions.

Each mission starts with a set of scientific questions to be answered, and a set of scientific requirements for the mission, which build on what has already been discovered by prior missions. Scientific requirements spell out the types of data that will need to be collected. These scientific requirements are then transformed into mission concepts that start to specify the kind of spacecraft and scientific instruments that need to be developed for these scientific questions to be answered.

Within Goddard, the Sciences and Exploration Directorate (SED) leads the center's scientific endeavors, including the development of technology related to scientific pursuits.

=== Collecting data in space – scientific instruments ===
Some of the most important technological advances developed by Goddard (and NASA in general) come from the need to innovate with new scientific instruments in order to be able to observe or measure phenomena in space that have never been measured or observed before. Instrument names tend to be known by their initials. In some cases, the mission's name gives an indication of the type of instrument involved. For example, the James Webb Space Telescope is, as its name indicates, a telescope, but it includes a suite of four distinct scientific instruments: Mid-Infrared Instrument (MIRI); Near-Infrared Camera (NIRCam); Near-Infrared Spectrograph (NIRSpec); Fine Guidance Sensor and Near Infrared Imager and Slitless Spectrograph (FGS-NIRISS). Scientists at Goddard work closely with the engineers to develop these instruments.

Typically, a mission consists of a spacecraft with an instrument suite (multiple instruments) on board. In some cases, the scientific requirements dictate the need for multiple spacecraft. For example, the Magnetospheric Multiscale Mission (MMS) studies magnetic reconnection, a 3-D process. In order to capture data about this complex 3-D process, a set of four spacecraft fly in a tetrahedral formation. Each of the four spacecraft carries identical instrument suites. MMS is part of a larger program (Solar Terrestrial Probes) that studies the impact of the Sun on the Solar System.

=== Scientific collaborations ===
In many cases, Goddard works with partners (US Government agencies, aerospace industry, university-based research centers, other countries) that are responsible for developing the scientific instruments. In other cases, Goddard develops one or more of the instruments. The individual instruments are then integrated into an instrument suite which is then integrated with the spacecraft. In the case of MMS, for example, Southwest Research Institute (SwRI) was responsible for developing the scientific instruments and Goddard provides overall project management, mission systems engineering, the spacecraft, and mission operations.

On the Lunar Reconnaissance Orbiter (LRO), six instruments have been developed by a range of partners. One of the instruments, the Lunar Orbiter Laser Altimeter (LOLA), was developed by Goddard. LOLA measures landing site slopes and lunar surface roughness in order to generate a 3-D map of the Moon.

Another mission to be managed by Goddard is MAVEN. MAVEN is the second mission within the Mars Scout Program that is exploring the atmosphere of Mars in support of NASA's broader efforts to go to Mars. MAVEN carries eight instruments to measure characteristics of Mars's atmospheric gases, upper atmosphere, solar wind, and ionosphere. Instrument development partners include the University of Colorado at Boulder, and the University of California, Berkeley. Goddard contributed overall project management as well as two of the instruments, two magnetometers.

=== Managing scientific data ===
Once a mission is launched and reaches its destination, its instruments start collecting data. The data is transmitted back to Earth where it needs to be analyzed and stored for future reference. Goddard manages large collections of scientific data resulting from past and ongoing missions.

The Earth Science Division hosts the Goddard Earth Science Data and Information Services Center (GES DISC). It offers Earth science data, information, and services to research scientists, applications scientists, applications users, and students.

The NASA Space Science Data Coordinated Archive (NSSDCA), created at Goddard in 1966, hosts a permanent archive of space science data, including a large collection of images from space.

== Spinoff technologies ==
NASA. Spinoff 1976. A Bicentennial Report. 1977.

Section 102(d) of the National Aeronautics and Space Act of 1958 calls for "the establishment of long-range studies of the potential benefits to be gained from, the opportunities for, and the problems involved in the utilization of aeronautical and space activities for peaceful and scientific purposes." Because of this mandate, the Technology Utilization Program was established in 1962 which required technologies to be brought down to Earth and commercialized in order to help the US economy and improve the quality of life.

Documentation of these technologies that were spun off started in 1976 with "Spinoff 1976". Since then, NASA has produced a yearly publication of these spinoff technologies through the Innovative Partnerships Program Office.

Goddard Space Flight Center has made significant contributions to the US economy and quality of life with the technologies it has spun off. Here are some examples: Weather balloon technology has helped firefighters with its short-range radios; aluminized Mylar in satellites has made sports equipment more insulated; laser optics systems have transformed the camera industry and life detection missions on other planets help scientists find bacteria in contaminated food.

== Facilities ==
Goddard's partly wooded campus is 6.5 miles (10.5 km) northeast of Washington, D.C., in Prince George's County. The center is on Greenbelt Road, which is Maryland Route 193. Baltimore, Annapolis, and NASA Headquarters in Washington are 30–45 minutes away by highway. Greenbelt also has a train station with access to the Washington Metro system and the MARC commuter train's Camden line.

=== Testing chambers and Manufacturing Buildings ===
The High Bay Cleanroom located in building 29 is the world's largest ISO 7 cleanroom with 1.3 million cubic feet (37,000 m^{3}) of space. Vacuum chambers in adjacent buildings 10 and 7 can be chilled or heated to ±200 °C (392 °F). Adjacent building 15 houses the High Capacity Centrifuge which is capable of generating 30 G on up to a 2.3-tonne (2.5-short-ton) load.

Parsons Corporation assisted in the construction of the Class 10,000 cleanroom to support Hubble Space Telescope as well as other Goddard missions.

=== High Energy Astrophysics Science Archive Research Center ===
The High Energy Astrophysics Science Archive Research Center (HEASARC) is NASA's designated center for the archiving and dissemination of high energy astronomy data and information. Information on X-ray and gamma ray astronomy and related NASA mission archives are maintained for public information and science access.

=== Software Assurance Technology Center ===
The Software Assurance Technology Center (SATC) is a NASA department founded in 1992 as part of their Systems Reliability and Safety Office at Goddard Space Flight Center. Its purpose was "to become a center of excellence in software assurance, dedicated to making measurable improvement in both the quality and reliability of software developed for NASA at GSFC". The center has been the source of research papers on software metrics, assurance, and risk management.

=== Near Space Operations Control Center (NSOCC) ===
While NASA was in the midst of the Gemini mission era there was a need for a new kind of operations hub and the Manned Space Flight Network Control Center (MSFNOCC) was created in building 13. The name has changed over the years and as such, the capability has grown; the facility has been the GSFC hub for human space flight and launch vehicle missions for years and has the distinct honor of having supported every single Shuttle mission.

After the MSFNOCC, the facility was renamed to the Network Control Center (NCC). It remained the NCC until 1997-1999 when the NIC was born. The NIC supported the beginning of the new age of growing space communications which included the International Space Station (ISS). The facility was later renovated from the floor up to become the Near Space Operations Control Center (NSOCC) in 2023. The NSOCC currently provides critical mission support for various launch efforts including SpaceX Crew & Cargo, Science missions such as JWST & PACE, and provides critical data services for Japan Aerospace Exploration Agency (JAXA) and European Space Agency (ESA).

The NSOCC provides a console based workspace for various network elements to collaborate and provide the highest possible level of service to NASA and its customers. Some of the network elements included in the NSOCC support structure are Flight Dynamics Facility (FDF), Human Space Flight (HSF), Launch Vehicles (LV), and Robotics mission support leadership, Search and Rescue (SAR), and "Data Acquisition Processing and Handling Network Environment (DAPHNE+).

=== Goddard Visitor Center ===
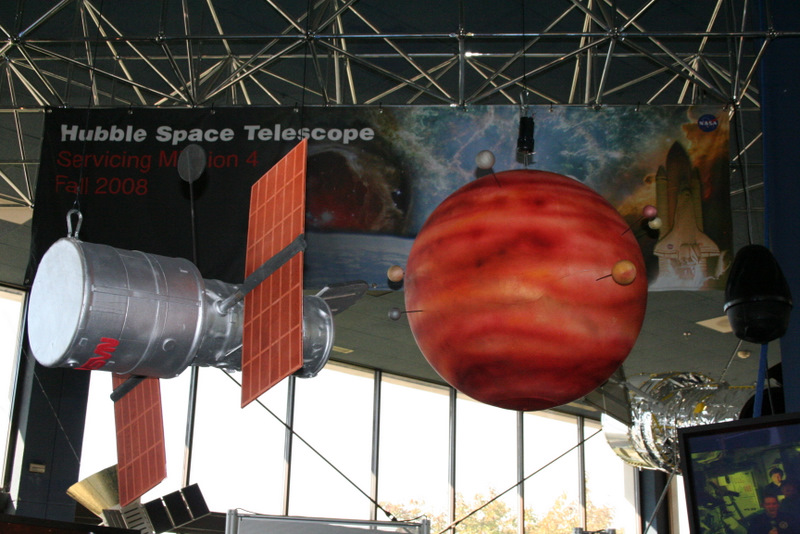
A scale model of the Hubble Space Telescope on display in the visitor center

Promotional video for the visitor center

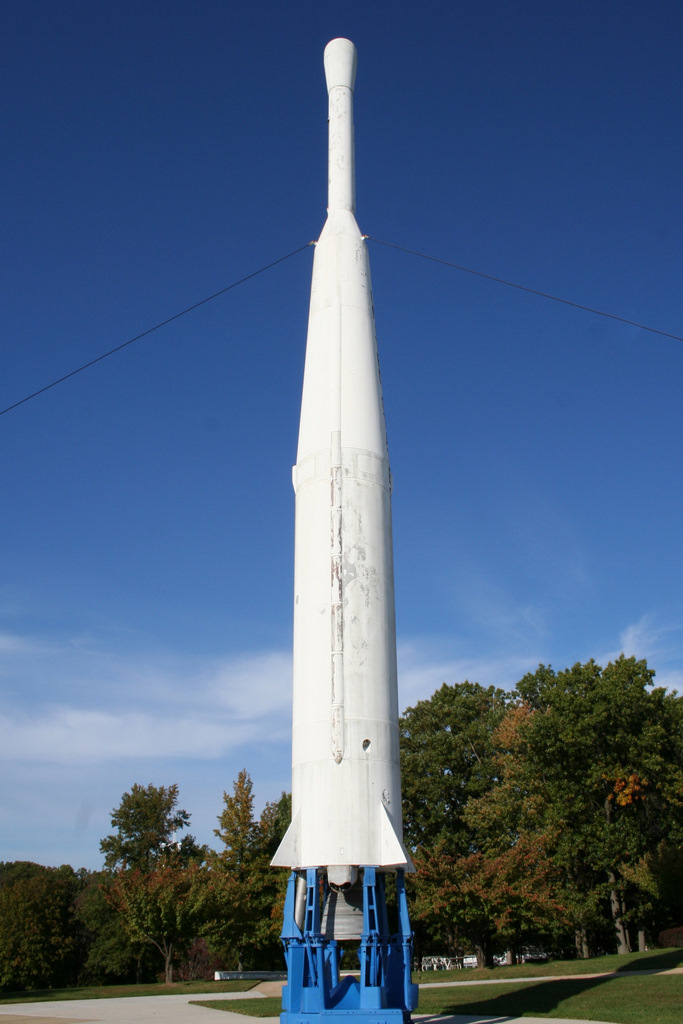
Delta rocket on display in the rocket garden

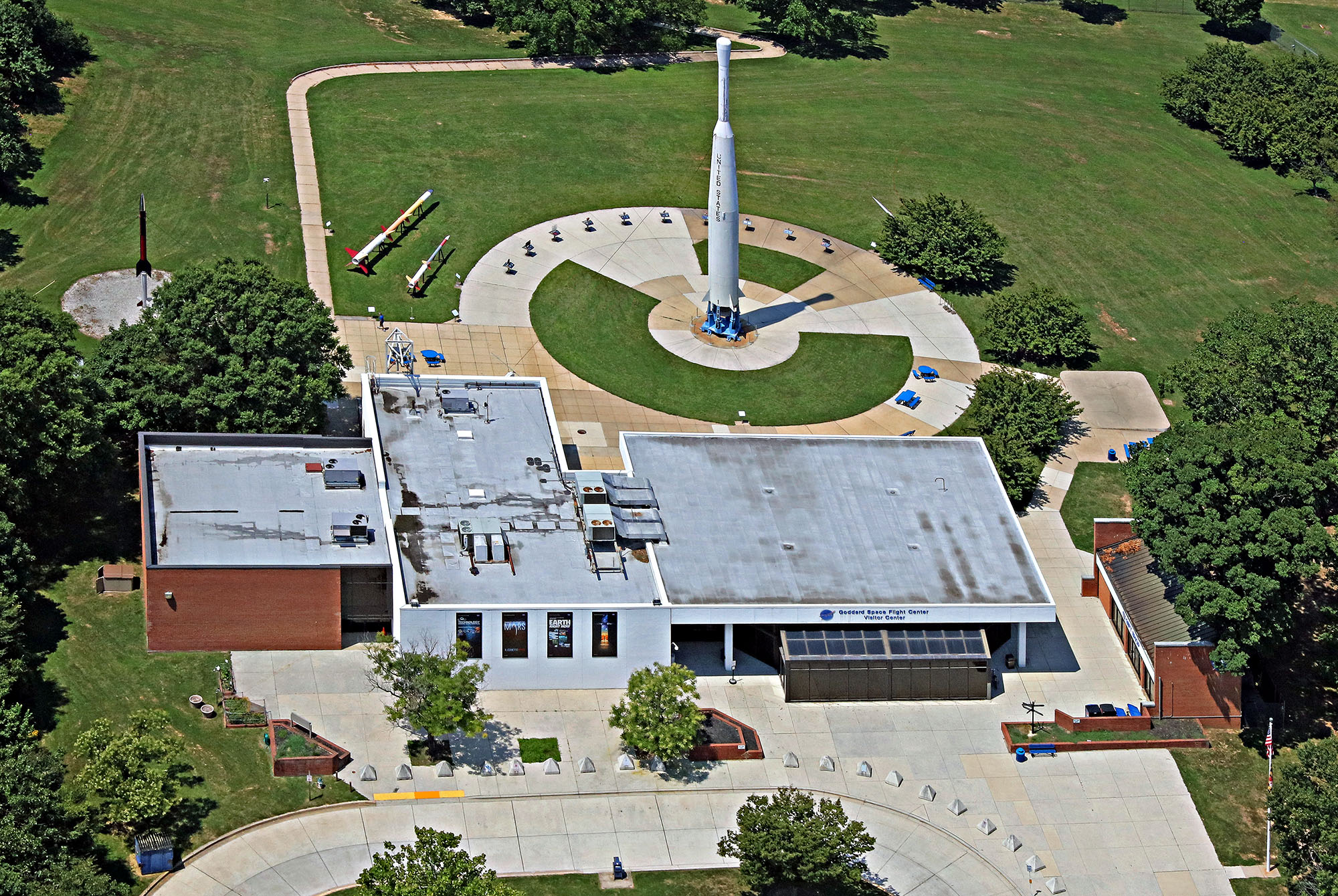
Visitor Center at NASA Goddard Space Flight Center

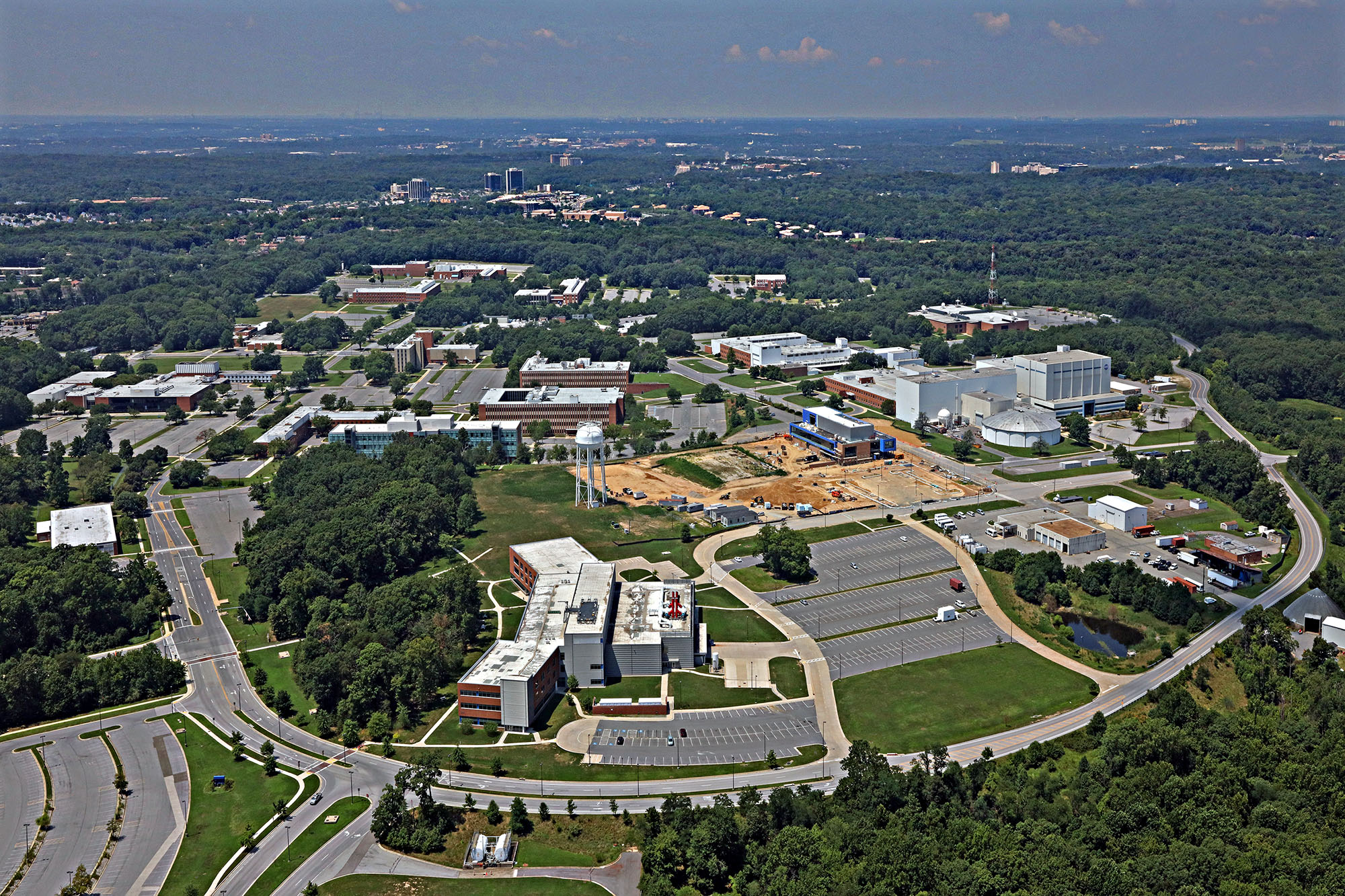
NASA Goddard Space Flight Center

The Goddard Visitor Center opened on 18 May 1976 in a building that previously housed an experimental radio station for the National Institute of Standards and Technology. The visitor center is open to the public Thursday, Friday, and Saturday, free of charge, and features displays of spacecraft and technologies developed there. The Hubble Space Telescope is represented by models and deep space imagery from recent missions.

The center hosts public programs and special events during the year. As an example, in September 2008 the Center opened its gates for Goddard LaunchFest. The event, free to the public, included robot competitions, tours of Goddard facilities hosted by NASA employees, and live entertainment on the Goddard grounds. GSFC also has a large theater for guest events such as lectures and presentations.

In September 2026, NPR reported that relocations of laboratories and other facilities at Goddard had resulted in the loss of specialized workspaces and equipment used by NASA scientists and engineers. The relocations affected work on missions including the Nancy Grace Roman Space Telescope, GRITSS, and DAVINCI.

=== External facilities ===
GSFC operates two facilities that are not located at the Greenbelt site. These facilities are:

- The Goddard Institute for Space Studies (GISS) located at Columbia University in New York City, where much of the center's theoretical research is conducted. Operated in close association with Columbia and other area universities, the institute provides support research in geophysics, astrophysics, astronomy and meteorology.
- The Katherine Johnson Independent Verification and Validation Facility (IV&V) in Fairmont, West Virginia, was established in 1993 to improve the safety, reliability, and quality of software used in NASA missions.

GSFC is also responsible for the White Sands Complex, a set of two sites in Las Cruces, New Mexico, but the site is owned by Johnson Space Center as part of the White Sands Test Facility.

== Employees ==
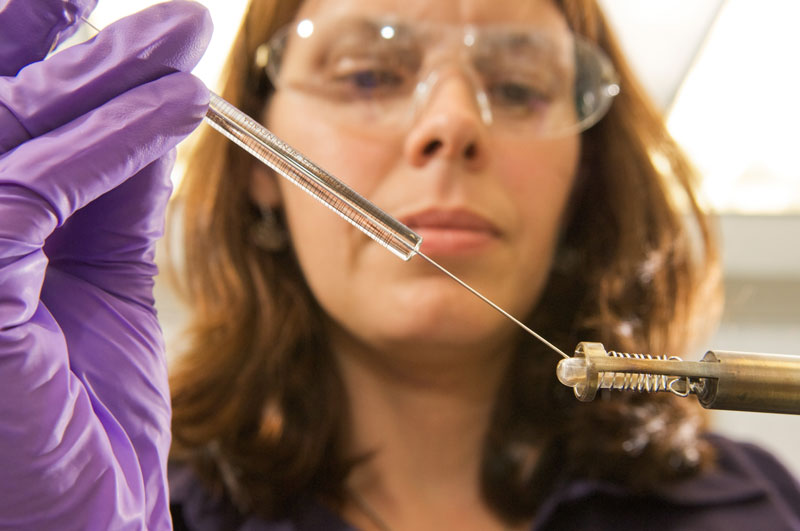
Goddard scientist Jennifer Eigenbrode injecting a chemical into a rock sample

Goddard Space Flight Center has a workforce of over 3,000 civil servant employees, 60% of whom are engineers and scientists. There are approximately 7,000 supporting contractors on site every day. It is one of the largest concentrations of the world's premier space scientists and engineers. The center is organized into eight directorates, which includes Applied Engineering and Technology, Flight Projects, Science and Exploration, and Safety & Mission Assurance.

Co-op students from universities in all 50 States can be found around the campus every season through the Cooperative Education Program. During the summers, programs such as the Summer Institute in Engineering and Computer Applications (SIECA) and Excellence through Challenging Exploration and Leadership (EXCEL) provide internship opportunities to students from the US and territories such as Puerto Rico to learn and partake in challenging scientific and engineering work.

== Community ==
The Goddard Space Flight Center maintains ties with local area communities through external volunteer and educational programs. Employees are encouraged to take part in mentoring programs and take on speaking roles at area schools. On Center, Goddard hosts regular colloquiums in engineering, leadership and science. These events are open to the general public, but attendees must sign up in advance to procure a visitors pass for access to the center's main grounds. Passes can be obtained at the security office main gate on Greenbelt Road.

Goddard also hosts several different internship opportunities, including NASA DEVELOP at Goddard Space Flight Center.

== Queen Elizabeth II's visit ==
Queen Elizabeth II of the United Kingdom and her husband Prince Philip, Duke of Edinburgh visited Goddard Space Flight Center on Tuesday, May 8, 2007. The tour of Goddard was near the end of the Queen's visit to commemorate the 400th anniversary of the founding of Jamestown in Virginia. The Queen spoke with crew aboard the International Space Station from the Network Integration Center (NIC, now NSOCC) located in Building 13.

== Panorama ==
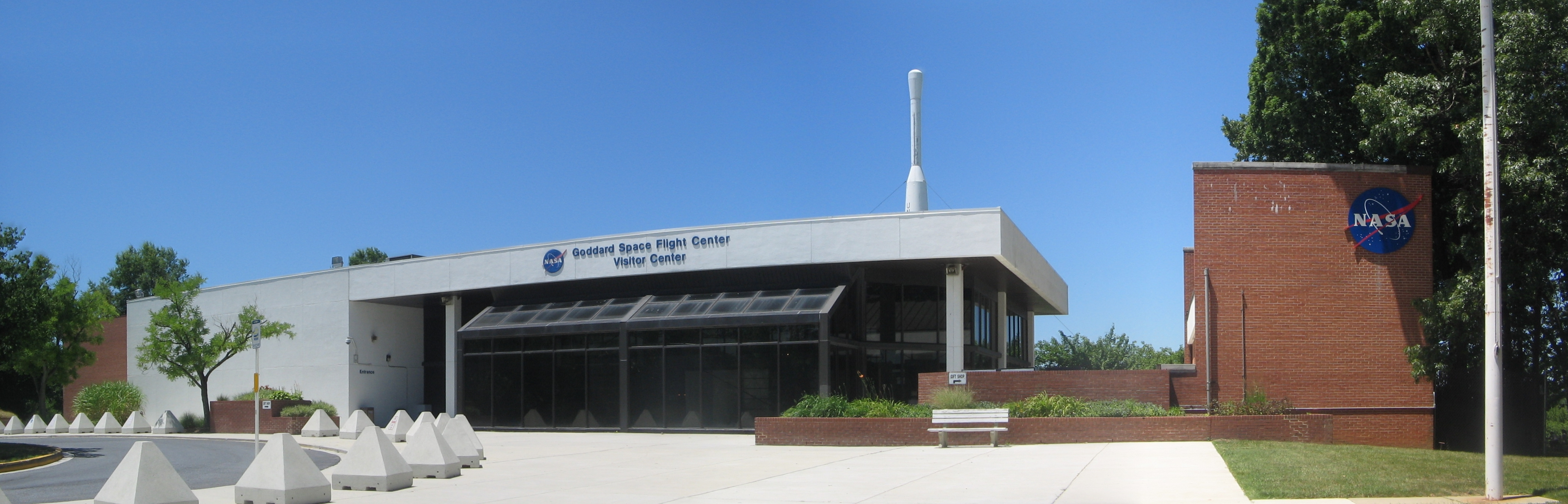
Panoramic view of the Visitor Center at Goddard Space Flight Center, with the top of a Delta rocket visible behind on right

== See also ==
- Goddard Earth Observing System
- Marshall Space Flight Center
- Jet Propulsion Laboratory
