= Bronwen Konecky =

American paleoclimatologist, climatologist and academic

- Born: Bronwen Louise Konecky
- Education: Brown University; Barnard College
- Awards: Nanne Weber Early Career Award (2019) NSF Postdoctoral Fellowship NSF Graduate Research Fellowship
- Scientific career
- Fields: Paleoclimatology, Climatology, Hydrogeology
- Workplaces: Washington University in St. Louis
- Thesis: Decadal to Orbital Scale Climate Change in the Indian Ocean Region: Precipitation Isotopic Perspectives from East Africa and Indonesia
- Website: https://blkonecky.wordpress.com/

Bronwen Konecky is a paleoclimatologist and climatologist whose particular area of focus lies in the past and present effect of climate change in the tropics. She is an associate professor in the Department of Earth and Planetary Sciences at Washington University in St. Louis.

== Education and academic career ==
In her senior year of high-school, Konecky took an A.P. Environmental Science class which sparked her curiosity into the sciences. Konecky would then go on to receive a B.A. in Environmental Sciences though Barnard College of Columbia University in 2005. In 2010, she graduated with a Sc.M. in Geological Studies from Brown University before receiving a Ph.D. in Geological Studies from the same institution in 2013. At Brown University, Konecky was a student of James M. Russell. Konecky's dissertation “Decadal to Orbital Scale Climate Change in the Indian Ocean Region: Precipitation Isotopic Perspectives from East Africa and Indonesia” focuses on the effects changes in climate have had on rainfall in the Indian Ocean Region through analysis of stable isotopes in lake sediments.

== Career and research ==
After graduating from Barnard College in 2005, Konecky began working with the African Millennium Villages Project as the Environmental Research Coordinator. The project's goal was to assist communities in rural Africa get out of extreme poverty and she stayed with the project until 2008. In 2013, she worked in the Cobb lab as a postdoctoral fellow at the Georgia Institute of Technology. Between 2014 and 2016, Konecky was a National Science Foundation Postdoctoral Fellow working closely with Oregon State University and University of Colorado Boulder before becoming a research scientist at the Cooperative Institute for Research in Environmental Sciences, University of Colorado Boulder. She held this position for a year before becoming an assistant professor in the Department of Earth and Planetary Sciences at Washington University in St. Louis in 2018, where Konecky works to this day.

Konecky's primary fields of research are Paleoclimateology, Climatology and Hydrogeology. She is known for her work studying ancient and modern rainfall in the tropics, specifically around the Indian Ocean and in Africa.

== Awards ==
- AGU Nanne Weber Early Career Award (2019)
- Packard Science and Engineering Fellowship (2019)

== Public engagement ==
In her spare time, Konecky also is a singer-songwriter.
