= Catharine Conley =

American biologist and NASA official

- Conley in 2011, at a news conference discussing signs of life in the universe at NASA's Kennedy Space Center

6th NASA Planetary Protection Officer
- In office 2006 – February 4, 2018
- President: George W. Bush; Barack Obama; Donald Trump
- Preceded by: John Rummel
- Succeeded by: Lisa Pratt

Personal details
- Born: Catharine Anastasia Conley; October 9, 1966
- Other name: Cassie Conley
- Scientific career
- Education: Massachusetts Institute of Technology; Cornell University
- Fields: Biology
- Workplaces: Ames Research Center
- Thesis: Spatial and temporal localization of the defects associated with Petunia cytoplasmic male sterility (1995)

Catharine Anastasia Conley (born October 9, 1966) is an American scientist known for her research on plants in space. She was NASA's 6th Planetary Protection Officer from 2006 through 2018.

== Early life ==
Catharine Anastasia Conley was born on October 9, 1966 to mathematician Charles Cameron Conley and geneticist Catharine "Kit" Smith.

== Education ==
Conley received her bachelor's from MIT, a Ph.D. in Plant Biology from Cornell University in 1994, and obtained a postdoctoral fellow position at The Scripps Research Institute studying proteins involved in muscle contraction. Conley conducted some of her research using the nematode Caenorhabditis elegans.

== NASA career ==
In 1999 Conley became a research scientist with the NASA Ames Research Center. Her research focuses on the evolution of motility, particularly animal muscle. One of her experiments was on board during the Space Shuttle Columbia disaster. The experiment, the fourteenth Biological Research In Canisters (BRIC-14), survived re-entry and the nematode cultures were still alive. Some scientific data was recovered.

In 2006, Conley was appointed as NASA's Planetary Protection Officer (see Planetary protection), replacing John Rummel. A NASA re-organization opened the job for competition in 2017, and Conley was replaced by Dr. Lisa Pratt in February 2018.

During her time at NASA, Conley worked with protecting life on Mars, focusing on keeping Earth's bacteria off Mars when doing research. This aligns with The Outer Space Treaty of 1967, which aims to keep contamination from Earth to other planets in check. Conley's biggest concern of contamination was transferring lichen from Earth to Mars. Both planets have similar requirements which allows lichen to grow. To address these concerns, NASA used the Curisosity rover, which surveys Mars' environment to see if it can support microbial life. The rover itself could contaminate Mars with microbes from Earth. To combat this issue, the landers used in missions are sterilized in an oven and kept in a bioshield until they reach Mars.

Government offices
Preceded by John Rummel	6th NASA Planetary Protection Officer; 2006 – 2018	Succeeded by Lisa Pratt
