= Tripiti (archaeological site) =

Coordinates: 34.9381°N 24.9869°E

Tripiti (also Trypiti) is the archaeological site of an ancient Minoan settlement in southern Crete, Greece. It is located in the Mesara Plain along the coast to the east of the village of Lendas.

== Geography ==
The Minoan settlement was built on a hill, 135 meters above sea level. It is 800 meters from the sea. There are three permanent fresh water springs in the area, one only 150 meters east of the site and also at 135 meters above sea level. The site is reached via a 40-minute climb over loose stones. Tripiti is 200 meters north of Kalokambos, where an Early Minoan tholos tomb has been excavated.

== Archaeology ==
Tripiti was first excavated 1986-1988 by Antonis Vasilakis. Minoa has long been famous for its settlements not having walls, inspiring theories of a long-standing peace, but walls are found at Tripiti. Two openings give access to the settlement at the northwest and southeast corners. Thirty-six Early Minoan II to Middle Minoan IA rooms have been uncovered at the site. Stone benches were built against the walls in some rooms. Artifacts discovered include a bronze chisel, axes, weights, mallets, hammers, milling stones and stone blades. Produce found in significant quantities included wheat, barley, vetch and peas. Bones found in the houses of the settlement indicate the presence of cattle, sheep, goats, pigs, hares and poultry.
