= Tripti Bhattacharya =

American paleoclimatologist

- Education: University of Arizona; University of California, Berkeley; Georgetown University
- Scientific career
- Workplaces: Syracuse University
- Thesis: Causes and Impacts of Rainfall Variability In Central Mexico on Multiple Timescales (2016)
- Doctoral advisor: Anthony Roger Byrne, John C.H. Chiang
- Other academic advisors: Jessica Tierney
- Website: trbhatta.expressions.syr.edu

Tripti Bhattacharya is the Thonis Family Professor of Earth and Environmental Sciences at Syracuse University.

== Education ==
Bhattacharya graduated from Georgetown University in 2010 with a B.S. in Environmental Science. She earned her PhD in Geography at the University of California, Berkeley, where she was a NSF-GRFP fellow. Her thesis was titled "Causes and Impacts of Rainfall Variability In Central Mexico on Multiple Timescales". Her research won the Denise Gaudreau Award for Excellence in Quaternary Studies, from the American Quaternary Association in 2014.

She trained as a postdoctoral researcher at University of Arizona with Jessica Tierney.

== Career ==
Bhattacharya joined Syracuse University's College of Arts and Sciences as an assistant professor in 2018.

She works on the relationship between ancient regional rainfall and global climate change. Her work creates climate models using geochemical and biological traces left by past climates (proxies). Her research on the Pliocene, a period with similar greenhouse gas levels to those in today's atmosphere, is part of the 2nd Pliocene Model Intercomparison Project (PlioMIP2). She has created a framework to interpret ancient sea surface temperature.

Her research on regional rainfall and climate change was cited in the United Nations' 2022 climate change report.

=== Service ===
Bhattacharya is a member of the American Geophysical Union, and a board member of her specialty group in the Association of American Geographers, and has worked to promote diversity in STEM fields.

In 2021, Bhattacharya was one of eight climate researcher at a workshop organized by the National Academies of Sciences, Engineering, and Medicine (NASEM). The collaboration was to identify potential future paleoclimate research directions.

== Awards ==
Bhattacharya was awarded Syracuse University's Meredith Teaching Recognition Award in 2021.

In 2023, she was awarded a National Science Foundation CAREER grant

In 2023 she was also awarded a Sloan Research Fellowship.
