= Geoffrey Eglinton =

British chemist

- Born: 1 November 1927; Cardiff, Wales
- Died: 11 March 2016 (aged 88)
- Education: University of Manchester
- Known for: Eglinton reaction
- Children: Timothy Eglinton; David Eglinton
- Awards: FRS (1976)
- Scientific career
- Workplaces: University of Bristol

Geoffrey Eglinton, FRS (1 November 1927 – 11 March 2016) was a British chemist and emeritus professor and senior research fellow in earth sciences at the University of Bristol.

== Education ==
Eglinton was educated at Sale Grammar School and the University of Manchester where he was awarded Bachelor of Science, Doctor of Philosophy and Doctor of Science degrees.

== Research and career ==
Eglinton's insights into the geological fate of organic compounds have made him an internationally respected biogeochemist. In addition to the significance of his research on molecular biomarkers (‘chemical fossils’), he was responsible for developing numerous experimental techniques that remain in widespread use.

One of the first researchers to illustrate the potential of coupled gas chromatography–mass spectrometry in organic geochemistry, Eglinton also pioneered the use of infrared spectroscopy to characterise both inter- and intra-molecular hydrogen bonding. These innovative techniques improved understanding of diverse aspects of the distribution, stable isotopic content and provenance of organic compounds in the global environment.

== Awards and honours ==
Eglinton was elected a Fellow of the Royal Society (FRS) in 1976. He won the Royal Medal in 1997 "In recognition of his contribution to our understanding of the way in which chemicals move from the living biosphere to the fossil geosphere, in particular the origin, genesis, maturation and migration of oil which has had great repercussions on the petroleum industry.",

With John M. Hayes he was awarded the Urey Medal of the European Association of Geochemistry in 1997.

In 2000 he received the V. M. Goldschmidt Award of the Geochemical Society.

He was awarded the Wollaston Medal in 2004.

He was a co-winner of the Dan David Prize in 2008 for his studies of organic chemical fossils, which reveal the inhabitants and climates of ancient worlds. (He shared the prize with Ellen Moseley-Thompson and Lonnie G. Thompson).

The Eglinton reaction is named after him. Professor Guy Orpen, Deputy Vice-Chancellor of the University of Bristol, said of his achievements: "He was one of the giants. His influence is still a key strand of our institutional future, and will be for a long time to come."

Geoffrey’s team at the University of Bristol’s celebrated Organic Geochemistry Unit was chosen to conduct the first organic analyses of Moon rocks brought to Earth in 1969 by astronauts aboard Apollo 11. He has been awarded the NASA Gold Medal for Exceptional Scientific Achievement.

== Personal life ==
Eglinton married Pamela Joan Coupland, and had two sons, and one daughter. His son Timothy Eglinton is a Professor of Biogeoscience at the Geological Institute, ETH Zürich.
