= Alfred E. Treibs =

Father of organic geochemistry (1899–1983)

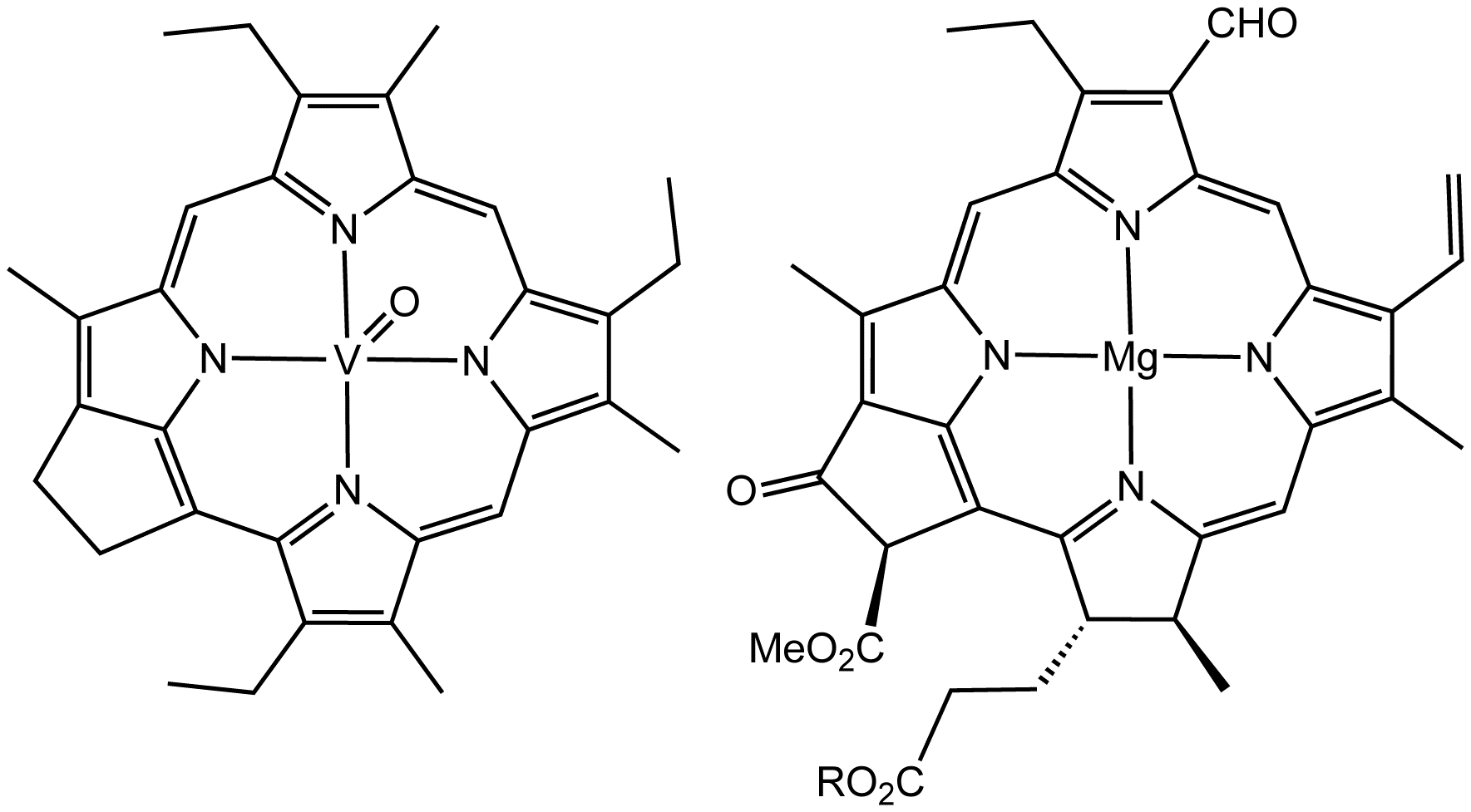
Structure of a vanadium porphyrin compound (left) extracted from petroleum by Alfred E. Treibs, father of organic geochemistry. Treibs noted the close structural similarity of this molecule and chlorophyll a (right).

Alfred E. Treibs (1899–1983) was a German organic chemist who is credited with founding the area of organic geochemistry. He received his PhD under Hans Fischer at the Technical University of Munich. Fischer had received the Nobel Prize in Chemistry for elucidating the structures of porphyrins.

In the 1930s Treibs discovered metalloporphyrins in petroleum. These porphyrins resemble chlorophylls. This discovery helped confirm the biological origin of petroleum, which was previously controversial.
