= Arctic Mars Analog Svalbard Expedition =

Scientific tests on Mars

Arctic Mars Analog Svalbard Expedition (AMASE) uses Mars analog sites on Svalbard for testing of science questions and payload instruments onboard Mars missions. AMASE has arranged annual expeditions on Svalbard since 2003 and is run by Vestfonna Geophysical AS and funded by the Norwegian Space Centre, ESA and NASA.

Payload instruments CheMin and SAM onboard NASA's Curiosity rover were deployed on AMASE in 2006–2011. Field deployment of payload instruments onboard ESA's ExoMars rover has been ongoing since 2007.

In 2007 ESA organized a competition, won by a student from Technical University of Denmark, which allowed the winner to carry out her own experiment during the expedition as well as assist in other experiments and activities.

== Dates of the expeditions ==
- 12 August 2007 – 26 August 2007
- 4 August 2008 – 17 August 2008
- 1 August 2009 – 24 August 2009
- 9 August 2010 – 25 August 2010
- 8 August 2011 – 21 August 2011
