= Peter B. de Menocal =

American oceanographer and paleoclimatologist

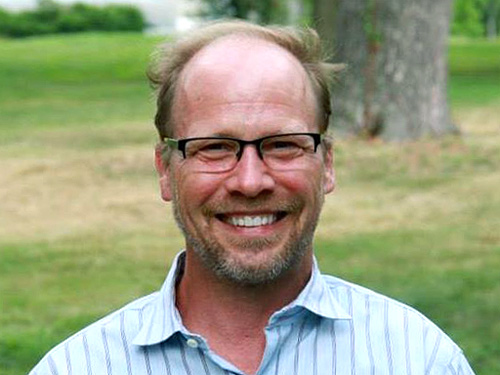
- Education: St. Lawrence University, University of Rhode Island, Columbia University
- Known for: African climate and human evolution, founding the Center for Climate and Life at Columbia University
- Scientific career
- Fields: Oceanography Paleoclimatology
- Workplaces: Woods Hole Oceanographic Institution
- Thesis: Pliocene-Pleistocene Evolution of Tropical Aridity
- Doctoral advisor: William F. Ruddiman
- Website: de Menocal's homepage

Peter B. de Menocal is an oceanographer and paleoclimatologist. He is the president and director of the Woods Hole Oceanographic Institution, a research facility in Massachusetts.

== Education ==
De Menocal earned a B.S. in geology from St. Lawrence University in 1982, an M.S. in oceanography from the University of Rhode Island in 1986, and his Ph.D. in geology from Columbia University in 1991.

He was awarded an honorary Doctor of Science degree from St. Lawrence University in 2009.

== Career ==
De Menocal spent much of his early career at Lamont–Doherty Earth Observatory of Columbia University, where he was Thomas Alva Edison/Con Edison Professor and founding director of the Center for Climate and Life.

De Menocal began working at Columbia University in 1986 as a graduate research assistant at Lamont–Doherty Earth Observatory. He was appointed dean of science in the Faculty of Arts and Sciences at Columbia in 2016.

He has authored more than 230 peer-reviewed publications. De Menocal frequently appears in the media and talks about climate change with the public.

=== Research ===
De Menocal uses geochemical analyses of marine sediments to investigate past changes in ocean circulation and terrestrial climates. His goal is to understand how and why past climates have changed, with a specific interest in placing contemporary climate change trends within the context of climate changes during the prehistoric past.

He has participated in 12 oceanographic research cruises and, in 2001, was on one of the last research cruises off the coast of northeast Africa before the region was declared off limits to scientists due to the threat posed by pirates.

== Awards ==
In 2008, de Menocal received the Distinguished Columbia Faculty Award, "given annually to faculty of unusual merit."

De Menocal was named a fellow of the American Geophysical Union in 2013. In 2014, he was named the American Geophysical Union Emiliani lecturer.
