= Timothy Eglinton =

British geologist

Tim Eglinton FRS
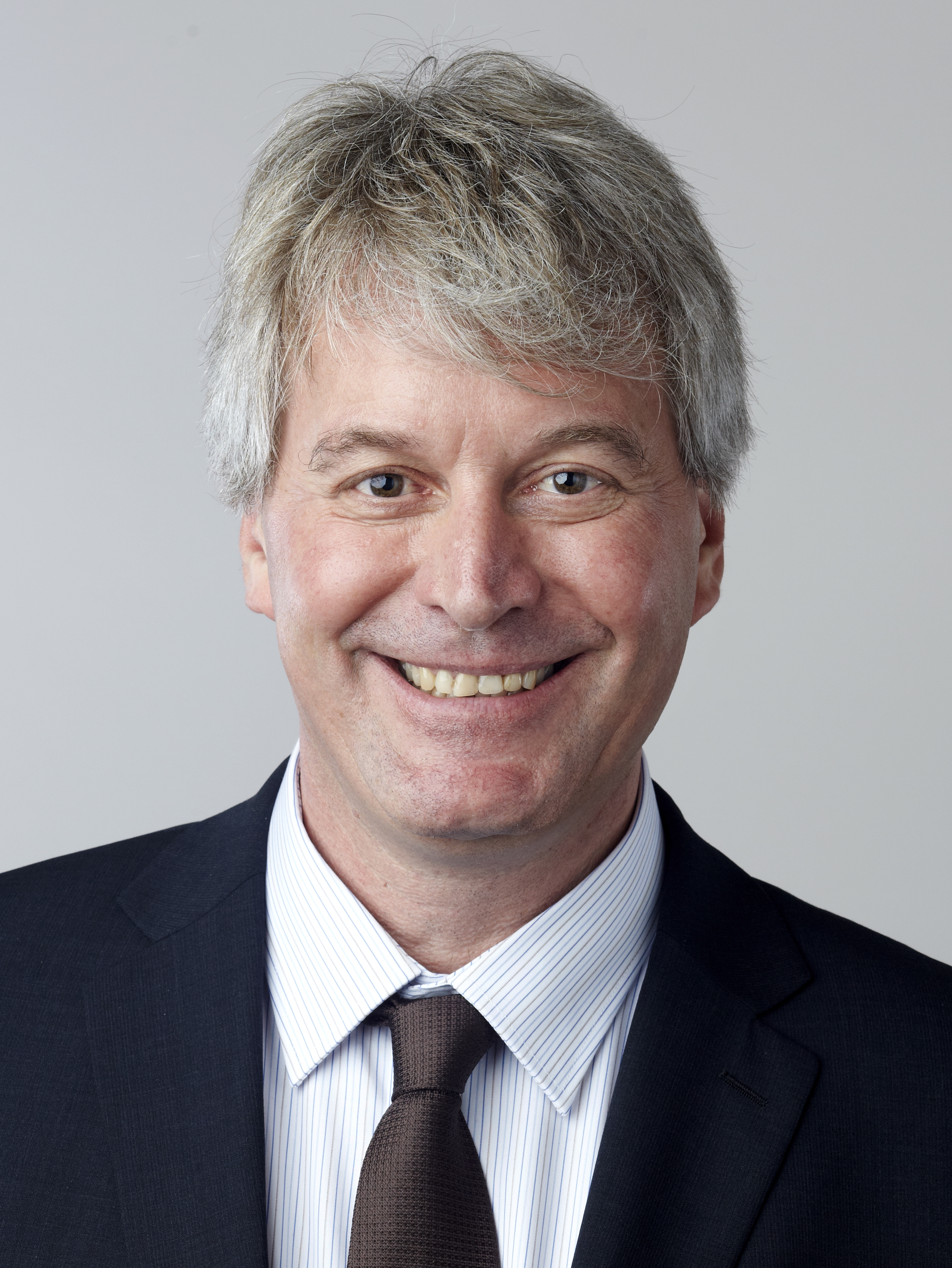
- Eglinton in 2014
- Born: Timothy Ian Eglinton
- Education: Plymouth Polytechnic; Newcastle University
- Scientific career
- Fields: Geology; Carbon cycle Sedimentology
- Workplaces: ETH Zürich; Woods Hole Oceanographic Institution; University of Oslo; Delft University of Technology
- Thesis: An investigation of kerogens using pyrolysis methods (1988)
- Website: www.biogeoscience.ethz.ch/the-group/people-a-z/person-detail.html?persid=170221

Timothy Ian Eglinton is a British geologist who is a professor of biogeoscience at the Geological Institute, ETH Zürich.

== Education ==
Eglinton was educated at Plymouth Polytechnic where he was awarded a Bachelor of Science degree in environmental science in 1982. He went on to study at Newcastle University, where he was awarded a Master of Science degree and a PhD in 1988 for research investigating kerogens using pyrolysis.

== Research and career ==
Eglinton's research is:

focussed on understanding of the processes that govern the Earth's carbon cycle from the molecular level to the global scale, and on the legacy of past biological activity and environmental conditions contained in organic signatures preserved in the geologic record.

Eglinton has revolutionised studies of Earth's carbon cycle. By developing an entirely new means of tracing the pathways of organic carbon in surface environments, ranging from eroding landforms to rivers, floodplains, the oceanic water column, microbial communities and marine sediments, he has replaced countless estimates and assumptions with accurately known transport times and carbon budgets. His findings have illuminated and reconciled formerly discrepant paleoclimatic records, revealed new forms of microbial life, demonstrated that microorganisms can attack and remobilise billion-year-old organic material, and traced the pathways of petroleum-derived carbon in surface environments.

=== Awards and honours ===
Eglinton was elected a Fellow of the Royal Society (FRS) in 2014.

== Personal life ==
Eglinton is the son of the organic chemist Geoffrey Eglinton. He is married to Lorraine Eglinton, and has two daughters and one son.
