= Organic geochemistry =

Study of interactions between organisms and the Earth

Organic geochemistry is the study of the impacts and processes that organisms have had on the Earth. It is mainly concerned with the composition and mode of origin of organic matter in rocks and in bodies of water. The study of organic geochemistry is traced to the work of Alfred E. Treibs, "the father of organic geochemistry." Treibs first isolated metalloporphyrins (derivatives of hemes, etc.) from petroleum. This discovery established the biological origin of petroleum, which was previously poorly understood. Metalloporphyrins in general are highly stable organic compounds, and the detailed structures of the extracted derivatives made clear that they originated from chlorophyll. But the field, as such, didn't really develop until the latter half of the twentieth century, when natural products chemists began trying to understand and track the transformations of natural products produced by organisms over geologic time—in marine sediments, rocks, oil, and coal. This led to development of ever-more-sophisticated and sensitive methods of spectroscopic analysis. Early applications included trying to identify the first traces of microbial life on earth in ancient rocks and ascertaining whether there were any signs of past or present life in the first samples of Lunar dust, as well as exploration for new petroleum deposits.

== Applications ==
=== Petroleum ===
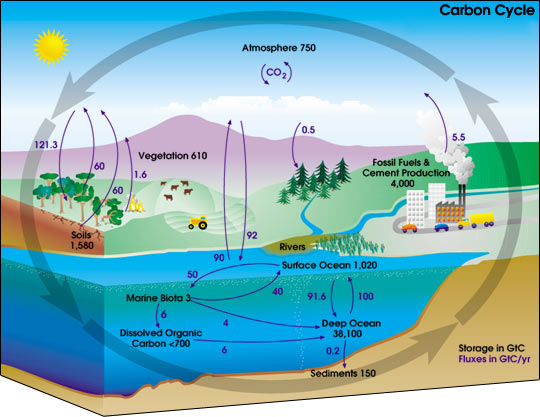
Carbon cycle diagram

The relationship between the occurrence of organic compounds in sedimentary deposits and petroleum deposits has long been of interest. Studies of ancient sediments and rock provide insights into the origins and sources of oil and petroleum, as well as the biochemical antecedents of life. Oil spills in particular have been of interest to geochemists in regards to the impact of petroleum and oil on the current geological environment. Following the Exxon Valdez Oil Spill, organic geochemistry knowledge on oil-spill chemistry bloomed with the analyses of samples from the spill.

Geochemists study petroleum-inclusions in geological samples to compare present-day fluid-inclusions to dated samples. This analysis provides insight into the age of the petroleum samples and the surrounding rock. Spectrographic, optical, destructive, and nondestructive methods are used to analyze samples via mass spectrometry or Raman spectroscopy. The discovered differences in samples, such as oil-to-gas ratio or viscosity are typically attributed to the rock source of the sample. Other characteristics typically noted are pressure/volume/temperature properties, sample texture, and sample composition. Complications in analysis arise when the source rock is near or in a water source.

Carbon-13 Placement in Isotope Chart where N is number of neutrons and Z is atomic number

Petroleum is also studied via carbon isotope analysis. Carbon isotopes provide insight into the Earth's carbon cycle and geological processes. Geochemists are able to discern the composition of petroleum deposits by examining the ratio of carbon isotopes and comparing this ratio to known values for carbon based structures of which the petroleum could be composed.

=== Coal ===
Vast knowledge about coal has been attained since the inception of its use as an energy source. Geochemists have determined that coalification results from a selective degradation of plant materials, while other plant material is preserved. Coal macromolecules are usually derived from degradation-resistant biopolymers contained in algae, spores, and wood. The analytical methods of Carbon NMR and gas chromatography-mass spectrometry (GC-MS) combined with flash pyrolysis has greatly enhanced the analyse.

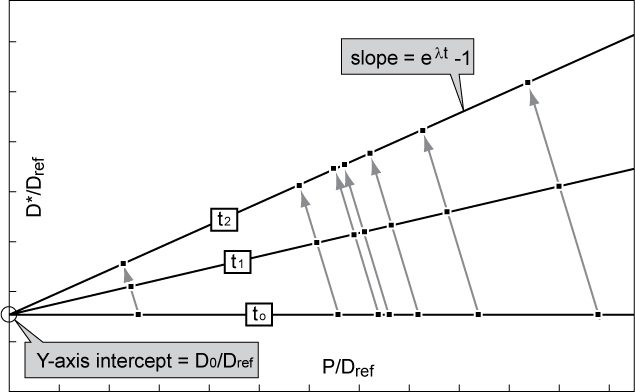
Example of isochron dating diagram and analysis

Further knowledge into the age of coal sediments has been attained via isochron dating of uranium in the coalified samples. Examination of the parent to daughter ratio of uranium isotopes has led to the dating of select samples to the Late Cretaceous Period.

=== Earth history and geobiology ===
Organic geochemistry is used in the analysis of ancient sediments and rocks to elucidate paleoenvironments, paleoclimates, and the evolution of earth's biogeochemical cycles since the advent of life. The study of biomarkers in extreme environments on the contemporary earth (e.g. hydrothermal vents, deep biosphere) serves to delimit the possibilities and types of life that may have existed on the early earth and on other planets with similar conditions.

=== Microbiology ===
Organic geochemical biomarkers (biosignatures) have led to the discovery new forms of microbial life in sediments and soils, as well as oceans, lakes, and hydrothermal systems.

=== Environmental ===
Organic geochemistry includes studies of recent sediments to understand the carbon cycle, climate change, and ocean processes. The impact of petroleum on the geological environment has attracted interest. Geochemistry also examines other pollutants in geological systems, such as metabolites formed from the degradation of hydrocarbons. Organic geochemistry analytical techniques, such as GC-MS, allow chemists to determine the intricate effects of organic metabolites and human-derived waste products on the geological environment. Of specific concern are the human-derived pollutants stemming from agricultural work. The use of animal manure, in combination with general municipal and sewage waste management, has changed many physical properties of the agricultural soil involved and the surrounding soils.

Organic geochemistry is also relevant to aqueous environments. Pollutants, their metabolites, and how both enter bodies of water are of particular importance in the field. This organic matter can also be derived from geological processes in or near bodies of water, similarly influencing nearby lifeforms and protein production. Fluorescence spectroscopy has been introduced as a technique to examine organic matter in bodies of water, as dissolved organic matter is typically fluorescent.

Winds disperse vast quantities of dust (red), sea salt (blue), sulphate (white) and black and organic carbon (green) around the world.

The study of organic geochemistry also extends to the atmosphere. Particularly, geochemists in this field study the makeup of insoluble material in the lower atmosphere. They have defined certain consequences of organic aerosols including physiological toxicity, direct and indirect climate forcing, smog, rain acidification, and incorporation into the natural carbon cycle.

== See also ==
- Geochemistry
- Biosignature, or biomarker, a fossil organic molecule that provides evidence of past or present life
- Biogeochemistry
