= List of minor planets: 473001–474000 =

The following is a partial list of minor planets, running from minor-planet number 473001 through 474000, inclusive. The primary data for this and other partial lists is based on JPL's "Small-Body Orbital Elements" and data available from the Minor Planet Center. Critical list information is also provided by the MPC, unless otherwise specified from Lowell Observatory. A detailed description of the table's columns and additional sources are given on the main page including a complete list of every page in this series, and a statistical break-up on the dynamical classification of minor planets.

Also see the summary list of all named bodies in numerical and alphabetical order, and the corresponding naming citations for the number range of this particular list. New namings may only be added to this list after official publication, as the preannouncement of names is condemned by the Working Group for Small Bodies Nomenclature of the International Astronomical Union.

Near-Earth obj.	MBA (inner)	MBA (outer)	Centaur
Mars-crosser	MBA (middle)	Jupiter trojan	Trans-Neptunian obj.
Unclassified

== 473001–473100 ==
Designation			Discovery			Properties		Ref
Permanent	Provisional	Named after	Date	Site	Discoverer(s)	Category	Diam.	Ref
473001	2015 HZ_{34}	—	December 14, 2007	Mount Lemmon	Mount Lemmon Survey	·	3.1 km	MPC · JPL
473002	2015 HK_{35}	—	September 28, 1994	Kitt Peak	Spacewatch	·	4.0 km	MPC · JPL
473003	2015 HR_{36}	—	April 28, 2011	Mount Lemmon	Mount Lemmon Survey	·	1.6 km	MPC · JPL
473004	2015 HH_{38}	—	February 13, 2010	Mount Lemmon	Mount Lemmon Survey	·	1.6 km	MPC · JPL
473005	2015 HO_{38}	—	March 7, 1997	Kitt Peak	Spacewatch	·	2.0 km	MPC · JPL
473006	2015 HQ_{38}	—	May 11, 2007	Kitt Peak	Spacewatch	·	1.1 km	MPC · JPL
473007	2015 HC_{40}	—	January 8, 1999	Kitt Peak	Spacewatch	·	1.4 km	MPC · JPL
473008	2015 HE_{40}	—	February 27, 2009	Kitt Peak	Spacewatch	·	2.4 km	MPC · JPL
473009	2015 HV_{40}	—	March 19, 2009	Kitt Peak	Spacewatch	·	2.9 km	MPC · JPL
473010	2015 HX_{40}	—	March 4, 2006	Kitt Peak	Spacewatch	·	1.7 km	MPC · JPL
473011	2015 HC_{42}	—	December 10, 2006	Kitt Peak	Spacewatch	·	1.1 km	MPC · JPL
473012	2015 HJ_{42}	—	September 13, 2005	Kitt Peak	Spacewatch	·	2.3 km	MPC · JPL
473013	2015 HM_{42}	—	September 28, 2003	Kitt Peak	Spacewatch	PHO	1.1 km	MPC · JPL
473014	2015 HQ_{42}	—	August 8, 2004	Socorro	LINEAR	NYS	1.6 km	MPC · JPL
473015	2015 HV_{44}	—	April 19, 1993	Kitt Peak	Spacewatch	·	1.3 km	MPC · JPL
473016	2015 HD_{55}	—	November 18, 2001	Socorro	LINEAR	·	1.8 km	MPC · JPL
473017	2015 HX_{55}	—	November 13, 2006	Kitt Peak	Spacewatch	·	3.0 km	MPC · JPL
473018	2015 HZ_{55}	—	July 24, 2000	Kitt Peak	Spacewatch	EOS	2.1 km	MPC · JPL
473019	2015 HN_{56}	—	November 7, 2007	Kitt Peak	Spacewatch	EOS	2.3 km	MPC · JPL
473020	2015 HT_{56}	—	March 11, 2005	Mount Lemmon	Mount Lemmon Survey	·	2.1 km	MPC · JPL
473021	2015 HC_{57}	—	July 6, 2005	Kitt Peak	Spacewatch	·	2.7 km	MPC · JPL
473022	2015 HS_{59}	—	December 15, 2007	Kitt Peak	Spacewatch	·	3.3 km	MPC · JPL
473023	2015 HJ_{60}	—	April 21, 2004	Kitt Peak	Spacewatch	EOS	1.9 km	MPC · JPL
473024	2015 HL_{61}	—	November 29, 1992	Kitt Peak	Spacewatch	·	1.6 km	MPC · JPL
473025	2015 HX_{61}	—	April 28, 2011	Kitt Peak	Spacewatch	·	1.8 km	MPC · JPL
473026	2015 HF_{62}	—	June 11, 1997	Kitt Peak	Spacewatch	·	2.5 km	MPC · JPL
473027	2015 HB_{64}	—	October 9, 2007	Mount Lemmon	Mount Lemmon Survey	AGN	1.2 km	MPC · JPL
473028	2015 HE_{64}	—	April 18, 2007	Kitt Peak	Spacewatch	·	1.4 km	MPC · JPL
473029	2015 HH_{68}	—	September 24, 2008	Mount Lemmon	Mount Lemmon Survey	·	1.9 km	MPC · JPL
473030	2015 HB_{69}	—	April 20, 2004	Kitt Peak	Spacewatch	·	2.7 km	MPC · JPL
473031	2015 HR_{69}	—	March 16, 2004	Kitt Peak	Spacewatch	·	2.1 km	MPC · JPL
473032	2015 HS_{71}	—	October 24, 2007	Mount Lemmon	Mount Lemmon Survey	·	2.5 km	MPC · JPL
473033	2015 HG_{72}	—	November 17, 2009	Kitt Peak	Spacewatch	·	920 m	MPC · JPL
473034	2015 HE_{73}	—	August 30, 2005	Kitt Peak	Spacewatch	THM	2.5 km	MPC · JPL
473035	2015 HW_{73}	—	November 2, 2007	Kitt Peak	Spacewatch	KOR	1.3 km	MPC · JPL
473036	2015 HS_{74}	—	September 23, 2009	Mount Lemmon	Mount Lemmon Survey	·	940 m	MPC · JPL
473037	2015 HD_{75}	—	October 19, 2006	Kitt Peak	Spacewatch	·	2.7 km	MPC · JPL
473038	2015 HG_{75}	—	May 7, 2007	Kitt Peak	Spacewatch	·	1.4 km	MPC · JPL
473039	2015 HX_{76}	—	September 19, 2003	Kitt Peak	Spacewatch	·	1.6 km	MPC · JPL
473040	2015 HK_{77}	—	February 23, 2006	Anderson Mesa	LONEOS	·	1.7 km	MPC · JPL
473041	2015 HA_{79}	—	September 4, 2000	Kitt Peak	Spacewatch	·	2.4 km	MPC · JPL
473042	2015 HU_{79}	—	December 18, 2001	Socorro	LINEAR	·	1.6 km	MPC · JPL
473043	2015 HM_{80}	—	September 21, 2008	Kitt Peak	Spacewatch	·	1.3 km	MPC · JPL
473044	2015 HW_{80}	—	May 16, 2010	Kitt Peak	Spacewatch	·	2.0 km	MPC · JPL
473045	2015 HM_{81}	—	March 10, 2005	Mount Lemmon	Mount Lemmon Survey	KOR	1.3 km	MPC · JPL
473046	2015 HQ_{81}	—	January 29, 2011	Mount Lemmon	Mount Lemmon Survey	·	910 m	MPC · JPL
473047	2015 HU_{81}	—	March 23, 2003	Kitt Peak	Spacewatch	HYG	2.7 km	MPC · JPL
473048	2015 HH_{82}	—	October 16, 2006	Kitt Peak	Spacewatch	·	2.3 km	MPC · JPL
473049	2015 HY_{83}	—	October 16, 2006	Mount Lemmon	Mount Lemmon Survey	·	3.3 km	MPC · JPL
473050	2015 HB_{84}	—	January 16, 2009	Mount Lemmon	Mount Lemmon Survey	·	1.7 km	MPC · JPL
473051	2015 HL_{84}	—	November 3, 2004	Kitt Peak	Spacewatch	·	1.6 km	MPC · JPL
473052	2015 HR_{85}	—	February 14, 2010	Catalina	CSS	·	2.2 km	MPC · JPL
473053	2015 HG_{86}	—	October 9, 2012	Mount Lemmon	Mount Lemmon Survey	·	2.8 km	MPC · JPL
473054	2015 HK_{86}	—	March 5, 2008	Mount Lemmon	Mount Lemmon Survey	·	630 m	MPC · JPL
473055	2015 HM_{87}	—	October 6, 2008	Kitt Peak	Spacewatch	·	1.5 km	MPC · JPL
473056	2015 HR_{88}	—	December 3, 2012	Mount Lemmon	Mount Lemmon Survey	·	3.2 km	MPC · JPL
473057	2015 HU_{88}	—	March 13, 2010	WISE	WISE	·	2.7 km	MPC · JPL
473058	2015 HO_{90}	—	August 24, 2001	Kitt Peak	Spacewatch	3:2	5.0 km	MPC · JPL
473059	2015 HZ_{90}	—	May 6, 2006	Mount Lemmon	Mount Lemmon Survey	·	2.9 km	MPC · JPL
473060	2015 HB_{91}	—	September 18, 2011	Mount Lemmon	Mount Lemmon Survey	THM	2.2 km	MPC · JPL
473061	2015 HO_{91}	—	November 20, 2000	Socorro	LINEAR	·	2.0 km	MPC · JPL
473062	2015 HR_{91}	—	February 12, 2004	Kitt Peak	Spacewatch	KOR	1.7 km	MPC · JPL
473063	2015 HR_{92}	—	February 22, 2009	Kitt Peak	Spacewatch	·	1.6 km	MPC · JPL
473064	2015 HG_{93}	—	September 23, 2008	Mount Lemmon	Mount Lemmon Survey	·	1.6 km	MPC · JPL
473065	2015 HQ_{93}	—	May 7, 2006	Mount Lemmon	Mount Lemmon Survey	·	2.0 km	MPC · JPL
473066	2015 HC_{94}	—	June 15, 2007	Kitt Peak	Spacewatch	·	2.1 km	MPC · JPL
473067	2015 HD_{94}	—	November 3, 2005	Mount Lemmon	Mount Lemmon Survey	CYB	4.4 km	MPC · JPL
473068	2015 HF_{94}	—	December 25, 2005	Kitt Peak	Spacewatch	·	1.4 km	MPC · JPL
473069	2015 HP_{94}	—	April 14, 2010	WISE	WISE	·	4.5 km	MPC · JPL
473070	2015 HQ_{94}	—	November 22, 2006	Mount Lemmon	Mount Lemmon Survey	·	1.0 km	MPC · JPL
473071	2015 HZ_{95}	—	December 25, 2005	Mount Lemmon	Mount Lemmon Survey	·	1.3 km	MPC · JPL
473072	2015 HX_{96}	—	November 28, 2010	Kitt Peak	Spacewatch	·	670 m	MPC · JPL
473073	2015 HV_{99}	—	December 1, 2008	Mount Lemmon	Mount Lemmon Survey	·	2.2 km	MPC · JPL
473074	2015 HD_{102}	—	September 15, 2006	Kitt Peak	Spacewatch	·	1.6 km	MPC · JPL
473075	2015 HV_{104}	—	March 3, 2005	Catalina	CSS	·	720 m	MPC · JPL
473076	2015 HG_{105}	—	April 25, 2007	Kitt Peak	Spacewatch	·	1.1 km	MPC · JPL
473077	2015 HE_{107}	—	December 20, 2009	Mount Lemmon	Mount Lemmon Survey	·	1.9 km	MPC · JPL
473078	2015 HQ_{114}	—	September 28, 2003	Anderson Mesa	LONEOS	·	2.1 km	MPC · JPL
473079	2015 HC_{115}	—	September 14, 2007	Catalina	CSS	·	2.1 km	MPC · JPL
473080	2015 HP_{120}	—	September 5, 2008	Kitt Peak	Spacewatch	L4	9.6 km	MPC · JPL
473081	2015 HX_{123}	—	April 24, 2006	Kitt Peak	Spacewatch	·	1.6 km	MPC · JPL
473082	2015 HF_{138}	—	November 1, 2008	Mount Lemmon	Mount Lemmon Survey	·	1.6 km	MPC · JPL
473083	2015 HG_{144}	—	April 15, 2010	Mount Lemmon	Mount Lemmon Survey	·	2.2 km	MPC · JPL
473084	2015 HN_{145}	—	March 10, 2005	Mount Lemmon	Mount Lemmon Survey	·	820 m	MPC · JPL
473085	2015 HQ_{148}	—	April 19, 2006	Mount Lemmon	Mount Lemmon Survey	·	2.0 km	MPC · JPL
473086	2015 HK_{149}	—	October 10, 2012	Mount Lemmon	Mount Lemmon Survey	·	1.9 km	MPC · JPL
473087	2015 HL_{149}	—	September 3, 1999	Kitt Peak	Spacewatch	·	1.5 km	MPC · JPL
473088	2015 HT_{149}	—	March 23, 1998	Kitt Peak	Spacewatch	·	2.7 km	MPC · JPL
473089	2015 HN_{150}	—	June 11, 2004	Kitt Peak	Spacewatch	·	3.4 km	MPC · JPL
473090	2015 HC_{151}	—	October 9, 2007	Kitt Peak	Spacewatch	EOS	1.7 km	MPC · JPL
473091	2015 HU_{153}	—	March 28, 2004	Kitt Peak	Spacewatch	EOS	2.0 km	MPC · JPL
473092	2015 HU_{154}	—	September 12, 2007	Mount Lemmon	Mount Lemmon Survey	·	2.7 km	MPC · JPL
473093	2015 HZ_{154}	—	September 17, 2012	Mount Lemmon	Mount Lemmon Survey	·	1.9 km	MPC · JPL
473094	2015 HA_{162}	—	February 3, 2009	Mount Lemmon	Mount Lemmon Survey	·	2.0 km	MPC · JPL
473095	2015 HJ_{162}	—	November 21, 2003	Kitt Peak	Spacewatch	PAD	1.9 km	MPC · JPL
473096	2015 HU_{162}	—	September 18, 2011	Mount Lemmon	Mount Lemmon Survey	·	2.4 km	MPC · JPL
473097	2015 HV_{165}	—	September 23, 2005	Kitt Peak	Spacewatch	THM	3.2 km	MPC · JPL
473098	2015 HW_{165}	—	November 13, 2007	Mount Lemmon	Mount Lemmon Survey	·	2.3 km	MPC · JPL
473099	2015 HG_{167}	—	March 11, 2007	Kitt Peak	Spacewatch	·	1.2 km	MPC · JPL
473100	2015 HN_{167}	—	February 3, 2009	Kitt Peak	Spacewatch	·	1.6 km	MPC · JPL

== 473101–473200 ==
back to top

Designation			Discovery			Properties		Ref
Permanent	Provisional	Named after	Date	Site	Discoverer(s)	Category	Diam.	Ref
473101	2015 HT_{169}	—	May 13, 2004	Kitt Peak	Spacewatch	·	2.6 km	MPC · JPL
473102	2015 HV_{170}	—	September 24, 2008	Mount Lemmon	Mount Lemmon Survey	·	1.4 km	MPC · JPL
473103	2015 HW_{170}	—	September 28, 2000	Kitt Peak	Spacewatch	·	3.4 km	MPC · JPL
473104	2015 HB_{172}	—	August 4, 2003	Kitt Peak	Spacewatch	·	2.0 km	MPC · JPL
473105	2015 HO_{172}	—	October 25, 2008	Kitt Peak	Spacewatch	·	2.4 km	MPC · JPL
473106	2015 HQ_{172}	—	May 15, 2004	Siding Spring	SSS	·	2.6 km	MPC · JPL
473107	2015 HT_{172}	—	October 27, 2005	Mount Lemmon	Mount Lemmon Survey	·	1.1 km	MPC · JPL
473108	2015 HC_{173}	—	October 27, 2005	Kitt Peak	Spacewatch	·	1.2 km	MPC · JPL
473109	2015 HM_{173}	—	December 30, 2005	Kitt Peak	Spacewatch	·	1.4 km	MPC · JPL
473110	2015 HN_{173}	—	February 24, 2006	Catalina	CSS	·	2.0 km	MPC · JPL
473111	2015 HS_{173}	—	December 21, 2008	Mount Lemmon	Mount Lemmon Survey	MRX	1.2 km	MPC · JPL
473112	2015 HZ_{173}	—	March 3, 2003	Palomar	NEAT	·	4.2 km	MPC · JPL
473113	2015 HA_{174}	—	January 18, 2008	Mount Lemmon	Mount Lemmon Survey	·	3.9 km	MPC · JPL
473114	2015 HL_{174}	—	February 24, 2010	WISE	WISE	·	2.7 km	MPC · JPL
473115	2015 HU_{175}	—	February 5, 2009	Mount Lemmon	Mount Lemmon Survey	VER	3.5 km	MPC · JPL
473116	2015 HW_{175}	—	April 16, 2004	Kitt Peak	Spacewatch	·	2.7 km	MPC · JPL
473117	2015 HZ_{175}	—	April 18, 1998	Kitt Peak	Spacewatch	·	1.6 km	MPC · JPL
473118	2015 HS_{176}	—	August 11, 2004	Campo Imperatore	CINEOS	T_{j} (2.97)	3.4 km	MPC · JPL
473119	2015 HF_{177}	—	August 29, 2006	Kitt Peak	Spacewatch	·	740 m	MPC · JPL
473120	2015 HL_{179}	—	November 9, 2007	Kitt Peak	Spacewatch	·	2.3 km	MPC · JPL
473121	2015 HJ_{180}	—	December 13, 2006	Kitt Peak	Spacewatch	NYS	1.3 km	MPC · JPL
473122	2015 JS	—	January 28, 2006	Catalina	CSS	·	2.2 km	MPC · JPL
473123	2015 JS_{2}	—	June 20, 2010	Mount Lemmon	Mount Lemmon Survey	·	3.5 km	MPC · JPL
473124	2015 JV_{2}	—	March 15, 2004	Kitt Peak	Spacewatch	EOS	2.0 km	MPC · JPL
473125	2015 JH_{3}	—	January 31, 2010	WISE	WISE	·	3.2 km	MPC · JPL
473126	2015 JP_{3}	—	September 18, 2011	Catalina	CSS	·	3.7 km	MPC · JPL
473127	2015 JZ_{4}	—	October 15, 2012	Catalina	CSS	·	3.1 km	MPC · JPL
473128	2015 JG_{5}	—	October 28, 2008	Mount Lemmon	Mount Lemmon Survey	·	2.1 km	MPC · JPL
473129	2015 JM_{5}	—	January 10, 2008	Mount Lemmon	Mount Lemmon Survey	·	3.5 km	MPC · JPL
473130	2015 JQ_{6}	—	December 5, 2007	Kitt Peak	Spacewatch	·	2.8 km	MPC · JPL
473131	2015 JV_{6}	—	November 17, 2006	Mount Lemmon	Mount Lemmon Survey	VER	2.7 km	MPC · JPL
473132	2015 JZ_{6}	—	September 29, 2003	Kitt Peak	Spacewatch	·	2.3 km	MPC · JPL
473133	2015 JS_{7}	—	December 25, 2013	Mount Lemmon	Mount Lemmon Survey	·	2.7 km	MPC · JPL
473134	2015 JJ_{10}	—	April 28, 2010	WISE	WISE	URS	3.1 km	MPC · JPL
473135	2015 KK_{2}	—	December 18, 2009	Mount Lemmon	Mount Lemmon Survey	·	3.1 km	MPC · JPL
473136	2015 KD_{3}	—	April 21, 2010	WISE	WISE	·	3.7 km	MPC · JPL
473137	2015 KK_{3}	—	September 12, 2007	Kitt Peak	Spacewatch	AGN	1.4 km	MPC · JPL
473138	2015 KR_{3}	—	October 10, 2008	Mount Lemmon	Mount Lemmon Survey	·	1.7 km	MPC · JPL
473139	2015 KT_{3}	—	September 17, 2006	Catalina	CSS	·	5.1 km	MPC · JPL
473140	2015 KP_{4}	—	December 13, 2006	Kitt Peak	Spacewatch	V	870 m	MPC · JPL
473141	2015 KN_{5}	—	September 10, 2007	Mount Lemmon	Mount Lemmon Survey	·	2.0 km	MPC · JPL
473142	2015 KH_{6}	—	August 26, 2011	Kitt Peak	Spacewatch	·	2.9 km	MPC · JPL
473143	2015 KL_{6}	—	January 16, 2008	Kitt Peak	Spacewatch	·	2.9 km	MPC · JPL
473144	2015 KP_{6}	—	December 4, 2007	Catalina	CSS	·	2.9 km	MPC · JPL
473145	2015 KQ_{8}	—	March 11, 2010	WISE	WISE	·	5.0 km	MPC · JPL
473146	2015 KW_{10}	—	June 19, 2010	Mount Lemmon	Mount Lemmon Survey	·	2.9 km	MPC · JPL
473147	2015 KG_{11}	—	June 16, 2005	Kitt Peak	Spacewatch	·	4.5 km	MPC · JPL
473148	2015 KL_{11}	—	February 11, 2014	Mount Lemmon	Mount Lemmon Survey	EOS	1.9 km	MPC · JPL
473149	2015 KU_{12}	—	January 8, 2010	Mount Lemmon	Mount Lemmon Survey	·	2.8 km	MPC · JPL
473150	2015 KY_{12}	—	January 11, 2008	Mount Lemmon	Mount Lemmon Survey	·	3.0 km	MPC · JPL
473151	2015 KR_{14}	—	September 23, 2011	Kitt Peak	Spacewatch	·	3.5 km	MPC · JPL
473152	2015 KM_{16}	—	September 14, 2006	Kitt Peak	Spacewatch	EOS	1.9 km	MPC · JPL
473153	2015 KW_{17}	—	July 10, 2005	Kitt Peak	Spacewatch	·	3.6 km	MPC · JPL
473154	2015 KR_{20}	—	February 23, 2006	Anderson Mesa	LONEOS	·	1.8 km	MPC · JPL
473155	2015 KZ_{21}	—	December 31, 2013	Kitt Peak	Spacewatch	·	3.5 km	MPC · JPL
473156	2015 KS_{24}	—	February 26, 2008	Kitt Peak	Spacewatch	EOS	1.7 km	MPC · JPL
473157	2015 KH_{26}	—	December 31, 1999	Kitt Peak	Spacewatch	·	940 m	MPC · JPL
473158	2015 KN_{26}	—	May 22, 2011	Mount Lemmon	Mount Lemmon Survey	·	1.3 km	MPC · JPL
473159	2015 KW_{27}	—	October 22, 2012	Mount Lemmon	Mount Lemmon Survey	AGN	1.2 km	MPC · JPL
473160	2015 KE_{28}	—	September 17, 2003	Kitt Peak	Spacewatch	·	1.4 km	MPC · JPL
473161	2015 KE_{29}	—	October 13, 2012	Kitt Peak	Spacewatch	(31811)	3.7 km	MPC · JPL
473162	2015 KP_{30}	—	November 19, 2006	Kitt Peak	Spacewatch	·	2.7 km	MPC · JPL
473163	2015 KA_{31}	—	October 21, 2006	Kitt Peak	Spacewatch	·	2.1 km	MPC · JPL
473164	2015 KC_{31}	—	November 20, 2003	Socorro	LINEAR	·	2.9 km	MPC · JPL
473165	2015 KO_{31}	—	April 22, 2009	Mount Lemmon	Mount Lemmon Survey	·	2.9 km	MPC · JPL
473166	2015 KS_{31}	—	November 19, 2006	Kitt Peak	Spacewatch	HYG	2.7 km	MPC · JPL
473167	2015 KE_{32}	—	November 4, 2012	Mount Lemmon	Mount Lemmon Survey	·	2.5 km	MPC · JPL
473168	2015 KR_{32}	—	April 20, 2009	Mount Lemmon	Mount Lemmon Survey	·	3.0 km	MPC · JPL
473169	2015 KU_{32}	—	October 23, 2008	Mount Lemmon	Mount Lemmon Survey	EUN	1.1 km	MPC · JPL
473170	2015 KJ_{38}	—	September 20, 2008	Kitt Peak	Spacewatch	RAF	1.4 km	MPC · JPL
473171	2015 KY_{38}	—	March 1, 2008	Mount Lemmon	Mount Lemmon Survey	·	3.1 km	MPC · JPL
473172	2015 KY_{39}	—	August 19, 2006	Kitt Peak	Spacewatch	KOR	1.2 km	MPC · JPL
473173	2015 KT_{46}	—	December 15, 2006	Kitt Peak	Spacewatch	·	1.0 km	MPC · JPL
473174	2015 KR_{49}	—	October 30, 2007	Mount Lemmon	Mount Lemmon Survey	·	2.3 km	MPC · JPL
473175	2015 KU_{52}	—	November 20, 2006	Kitt Peak	Spacewatch	VER	2.6 km	MPC · JPL
473176	2015 KF_{57}	—	December 31, 2002	Socorro	LINEAR	T_{j} (2.99)	5.1 km	MPC · JPL
473177	2015 KT_{59}	—	April 17, 2010	WISE	WISE	·	4.3 km	MPC · JPL
473178	2015 KZ_{60}	—	March 25, 2006	Kitt Peak	Spacewatch	·	2.4 km	MPC · JPL
473179	2015 KP_{63}	—	April 17, 2005	Kitt Peak	Spacewatch	·	2.6 km	MPC · JPL
473180	2015 KM_{64}	—	November 15, 2007	Mount Lemmon	Mount Lemmon Survey	·	2.4 km	MPC · JPL
473181	2015 KL_{67}	—	April 30, 2004	Kitt Peak	Spacewatch	·	1.5 km	MPC · JPL
473182	2015 KU_{67}	—	January 9, 2014	Mount Lemmon	Mount Lemmon Survey	·	1.8 km	MPC · JPL
473183	2015 KX_{67}	—	May 8, 1994	Kitt Peak	Spacewatch	·	2.6 km	MPC · JPL
473184	2015 KD_{69}	—	February 10, 2008	Kitt Peak	Spacewatch	CYB	3.0 km	MPC · JPL
473185	2015 KN_{70}	—	February 20, 2014	Mount Lemmon	Mount Lemmon Survey	·	2.6 km	MPC · JPL
473186	2015 KR_{70}	—	January 17, 2009	Kitt Peak	Spacewatch	·	2.4 km	MPC · JPL
473187	2015 KD_{71}	—	October 26, 2008	Mount Lemmon	Mount Lemmon Survey	·	2.3 km	MPC · JPL
473188	2015 KG_{71}	—	February 7, 2008	Mount Lemmon	Mount Lemmon Survey	CYB	2.6 km	MPC · JPL
473189	2015 KO_{71}	—	March 17, 2009	Kitt Peak	Spacewatch	·	3.3 km	MPC · JPL
473190	2015 KF_{72}	—	November 15, 2007	Catalina	CSS	·	2.1 km	MPC · JPL
473191	2015 KJ_{73}	—	October 30, 2005	Kitt Peak	Spacewatch	·	3.1 km	MPC · JPL
473192	2015 KU_{73}	—	October 20, 2012	Mount Lemmon	Mount Lemmon Survey	·	3.2 km	MPC · JPL
473193	2015 KZ_{75}	—	March 1, 2009	Kitt Peak	Spacewatch	EOS	1.6 km	MPC · JPL
473194	2015 KH_{76}	—	December 31, 2007	Kitt Peak	Spacewatch	·	3.2 km	MPC · JPL
473195	2015 KJ_{76}	—	January 11, 2008	Mount Lemmon	Mount Lemmon Survey	·	2.6 km	MPC · JPL
473196	2015 KQ_{77}	—	February 26, 2009	Kitt Peak	Spacewatch	TEL	1.4 km	MPC · JPL
473197	2015 KM_{82}	—	December 15, 2006	Kitt Peak	Spacewatch	·	4.4 km	MPC · JPL
473198	2015 KV_{83}	—	December 30, 2007	Kitt Peak	Spacewatch	EOS	1.9 km	MPC · JPL
473199	2015 KF_{90}	—	January 24, 2014	Haleakala	Pan-STARRS 1	·	3.0 km	MPC · JPL
473200	2015 KB_{91}	—	December 16, 2007	Mount Lemmon	Mount Lemmon Survey	·	3.2 km	MPC · JPL

== 473201–473300 ==
back to top

Designation			Discovery			Properties		Ref
Permanent	Provisional	Named after	Date	Site	Discoverer(s)	Category	Diam.	Ref
473201	2015 KT_{94}	—	January 30, 2009	Mount Lemmon	Mount Lemmon Survey	EOS	1.6 km	MPC · JPL
473202	2015 KF_{98}	—	April 23, 2004	Kitt Peak	Spacewatch	·	2.9 km	MPC · JPL
473203	2015 KW_{101}	—	November 15, 2006	Mount Lemmon	Mount Lemmon Survey	EOS	2.3 km	MPC · JPL
473204	2015 KF_{103}	—	January 18, 2010	WISE	WISE	·	2.7 km	MPC · JPL
473205	2015 KX_{110}	—	February 9, 2008	Kitt Peak	Spacewatch	VER	2.6 km	MPC · JPL
473206	2015 KG_{113}	—	September 26, 1995	Kitt Peak	Spacewatch	EOS	1.6 km	MPC · JPL
473207	2015 KM_{113}	—	March 19, 2009	Kitt Peak	Spacewatch	·	3.1 km	MPC · JPL
473208	2015 KE_{115}	—	November 12, 2010	Mount Lemmon	Mount Lemmon Survey	3:2	4.8 km	MPC · JPL
473209	2015 KJ_{116}	—	April 3, 2010	WISE	WISE	·	3.6 km	MPC · JPL
473210	2015 KM_{116}	—	September 28, 2009	Kitt Peak	Spacewatch	3:2	4.4 km	MPC · JPL
473211	2015 KB_{120}	—	January 20, 2009	Catalina	CSS	TIR	3.5 km	MPC · JPL
473212	2015 KT_{125}	—	November 8, 2007	Mount Lemmon	Mount Lemmon Survey	EOS	1.7 km	MPC · JPL
473213	2015 KF_{129}	—	March 1, 2009	Mount Lemmon	Mount Lemmon Survey	·	2.0 km	MPC · JPL
473214	2015 KS_{129}	—	January 25, 2006	Kitt Peak	Spacewatch	·	1.2 km	MPC · JPL
473215	2015 KX_{129}	—	January 1, 2009	Mount Lemmon	Mount Lemmon Survey	·	1.8 km	MPC · JPL
473216	2015 KB_{131}	—	May 8, 2005	Kitt Peak	Spacewatch	·	2.1 km	MPC · JPL
473217	2015 KP_{133}	—	September 12, 2007	Mount Lemmon	Mount Lemmon Survey	·	1.7 km	MPC · JPL
473218	2015 KW_{133}	—	November 24, 2006	Kitt Peak	Spacewatch	VER	4.5 km	MPC · JPL
473219	2015 KY_{133}	—	November 29, 2005	Mount Lemmon	Mount Lemmon Survey	·	1.5 km	MPC · JPL
473220	2015 KY_{135}	—	November 29, 2003	Kitt Peak	Spacewatch	·	720 m	MPC · JPL
473221	2015 KF_{140}	—	January 28, 2006	Kitt Peak	Spacewatch	·	1.2 km	MPC · JPL
473222	2015 KD_{141}	—	May 25, 2006	Mount Lemmon	Mount Lemmon Survey	MRX	1.0 km	MPC · JPL
473223	2015 KY_{141}	—	October 8, 2012	Kitt Peak	Spacewatch	·	1.9 km	MPC · JPL
473224	2015 KW_{142}	—	October 21, 1995	Kitt Peak	Spacewatch	·	4.5 km	MPC · JPL
473225	2015 KX_{144}	—	September 27, 2006	Kitt Peak	Spacewatch	·	2.3 km	MPC · JPL
473226	2015 KG_{145}	—	February 10, 2014	Mount Lemmon	Mount Lemmon Survey	·	2.6 km	MPC · JPL
473227	2015 KO_{147}	—	May 13, 2009	Kitt Peak	Spacewatch	·	3.4 km	MPC · JPL
473228	2015 KW_{147}	—	February 10, 2008	Mount Lemmon	Mount Lemmon Survey	·	4.3 km	MPC · JPL
473229	2015 KC_{150}	—	April 14, 2004	Kitt Peak	Spacewatch	·	2.4 km	MPC · JPL
473230	2015 KP_{151}	—	August 4, 2008	Siding Spring	SSS	·	1.9 km	MPC · JPL
473231	2015 KH_{152}	—	January 11, 2008	Kitt Peak	Spacewatch	·	4.5 km	MPC · JPL
473232	2015 KE_{156}	—	January 31, 2009	Mount Lemmon	Mount Lemmon Survey	·	3.9 km	MPC · JPL
473233	2015 KG_{161}	—	September 7, 2004	Kitt Peak	Spacewatch	·	1.3 km	MPC · JPL
473234	2015 LA	—	February 27, 2006	Kitt Peak	Spacewatch	·	1.9 km	MPC · JPL
473235	2015 LO	—	October 5, 2003	Kitt Peak	Spacewatch	·	2.0 km	MPC · JPL
473236	2015 LM_{3}	—	December 25, 2009	Kitt Peak	Spacewatch	·	1.5 km	MPC · JPL
473237	2015 LM_{4}	—	July 3, 2005	Mount Lemmon	Mount Lemmon Survey	EOS	2.1 km	MPC · JPL
473238	2015 LZ_{4}	—	November 17, 2006	Kitt Peak	Spacewatch	·	3.6 km	MPC · JPL
473239	2015 LL_{6}	—	July 25, 2008	Siding Spring	SSS	3:2	6.5 km	MPC · JPL
473240	2015 LE_{13}	—	November 29, 2005	Catalina	CSS	·	1.6 km	MPC · JPL
473241	2015 LL_{23}	—	March 15, 2004	Kitt Peak	Spacewatch	·	2.6 km	MPC · JPL
473242	2015 LH_{32}	—	November 22, 2000	Kitt Peak	Spacewatch	·	3.2 km	MPC · JPL
473243	2015 LV_{36}	—	May 25, 2010	Mount Lemmon	Mount Lemmon Survey	·	3.3 km	MPC · JPL
473244	2015 LE_{37}	—	November 7, 2008	Mount Lemmon	Mount Lemmon Survey	EUN	1.4 km	MPC · JPL
473245	2015 LG_{37}	—	November 11, 2006	Mount Lemmon	Mount Lemmon Survey	·	3.5 km	MPC · JPL
473246	2015 LN_{37}	—	May 23, 2010	WISE	WISE	THB	3.6 km	MPC · JPL
473247	2015 MF_{1}	—	January 10, 2008	Mount Lemmon	Mount Lemmon Survey	EOS	2.0 km	MPC · JPL
473248	2015 MT_{1}	—	September 16, 2003	Kitt Peak	Spacewatch	·	2.3 km	MPC · JPL
473249	2015 MW_{1}	—	November 7, 2008	Mount Lemmon	Mount Lemmon Survey	·	2.0 km	MPC · JPL
473250	2015 MA_{2}	—	January 13, 2008	Kitt Peak	Spacewatch	·	2.6 km	MPC · JPL
473251	2015 MD_{2}	—	December 4, 2012	Mount Lemmon	Mount Lemmon Survey	EOS	2.0 km	MPC · JPL
473252	2015 ML_{6}	—	January 28, 2007	Mount Lemmon	Mount Lemmon Survey	·	3.2 km	MPC · JPL
473253	2015 MF_{15}	—	March 11, 2008	Mount Lemmon	Mount Lemmon Survey	·	3.7 km	MPC · JPL
473254	2015 MQ_{19}	—	March 21, 2002	Kitt Peak	Spacewatch	·	1.4 km	MPC · JPL
473255	2015 MT_{21}	—	March 29, 2010	WISE	WISE	·	2.3 km	MPC · JPL
473256	2015 MT_{23}	—	November 6, 2012	Mount Lemmon	Mount Lemmon Survey	HOF	2.2 km	MPC · JPL
473257	2015 MF_{24}	—	March 16, 2004	Kitt Peak	Spacewatch	·	3.1 km	MPC · JPL
473258	2015 MU_{24}	—	March 18, 2009	Kitt Peak	Spacewatch	VER	2.4 km	MPC · JPL
473259	2015 MD_{26}	—	September 28, 2006	Catalina	CSS	EOS	2.3 km	MPC · JPL
473260	2015 MX_{26}	—	March 18, 2010	Kitt Peak	Spacewatch	·	1.8 km	MPC · JPL
473261	2015 MA_{28}	—	September 17, 2009	Kitt Peak	Spacewatch	3:2	4.9 km	MPC · JPL
473262	2015 MN_{31}	—	November 13, 2006	Catalina	CSS	·	3.0 km	MPC · JPL
473263	2015 ML_{35}	—	January 19, 2008	Mount Lemmon	Mount Lemmon Survey	·	3.4 km	MPC · JPL
473264	2015 MT_{35}	—	June 18, 2006	Kitt Peak	Spacewatch	·	2.1 km	MPC · JPL
473265	2015 MY_{35}	—	September 19, 2006	Catalina	CSS	EOS	2.2 km	MPC · JPL
473266	2015 MC_{36}	—	November 21, 2006	Mount Lemmon	Mount Lemmon Survey	·	6.5 km	MPC · JPL
473267	2015 MN_{37}	—	April 2, 2009	Kitt Peak	Spacewatch	LIX	3.0 km	MPC · JPL
473268	2015 MF_{38}	—	January 1, 2003	Kitt Peak	Spacewatch	·	2.5 km	MPC · JPL
473269	2015 MJ_{42}	—	October 16, 2007	Mount Lemmon	Mount Lemmon Survey	·	2.1 km	MPC · JPL
473270	2015 MM_{44}	—	November 12, 2012	Catalina	CSS	·	3.0 km	MPC · JPL
473271	2015 MH_{66}	—	December 16, 2007	Catalina	CSS	BRA	2.1 km	MPC · JPL
473272	2015 MR_{91}	—	April 3, 2010	WISE	WISE	·	4.3 km	MPC · JPL
473273	2015 MJ_{92}	—	January 1, 2008	Kitt Peak	Spacewatch	·	2.7 km	MPC · JPL
473274	2015 MW_{92}	—	December 4, 2012	Mount Lemmon	Mount Lemmon Survey	·	2.4 km	MPC · JPL
473275	2015 MW_{93}	—	November 13, 2006	Catalina	CSS	·	4.2 km	MPC · JPL
473276	2015 MC_{94}	—	March 8, 2008	Mount Lemmon	Mount Lemmon Survey	·	3.3 km	MPC · JPL
473277	2015 NT_{10}	—	January 26, 2010	WISE	WISE	·	3.2 km	MPC · JPL
473278	2015 ND_{11}	—	January 9, 2014	Mount Lemmon	Mount Lemmon Survey	·	3.0 km	MPC · JPL
473279	2015 NG_{12}	—	January 10, 2008	Catalina	CSS	·	4.6 km	MPC · JPL
473280	2015 NR_{22}	—	March 12, 2003	Kitt Peak	Spacewatch	·	2.6 km	MPC · JPL
473281	2015 NT_{25}	—	May 7, 2005	Mount Lemmon	Mount Lemmon Survey	·	2.3 km	MPC · JPL
473282	2015 OC_{5}	—	December 3, 2010	Mount Lemmon	Mount Lemmon Survey	T_{j} (2.99) · 3:2	7.4 km	MPC · JPL
473283	2015 OO_{19}	—	September 16, 2006	Kitt Peak	Spacewatch	·	1.8 km	MPC · JPL
473284	2015 OE_{42}	—	September 20, 2001	Socorro	LINEAR	MRX	880 m	MPC · JPL
473285	2015 PZ_{7}	—	June 26, 2007	Kitt Peak	Spacewatch	PHO	810 m	MPC · JPL
473286	2015 PD_{30}	—	February 8, 2007	Kitt Peak	Spacewatch	EOS	2.7 km	MPC · JPL
473287	2015 PZ_{46}	—	April 30, 2009	Kitt Peak	Spacewatch	·	2.7 km	MPC · JPL
473288	2015 PT_{281}	—	October 28, 2010	Mount Lemmon	Mount Lemmon Survey	LIX	3.1 km	MPC · JPL
473289	2015 PL_{293}	—	April 24, 2011	Mount Lemmon	Mount Lemmon Survey	·	690 m	MPC · JPL
473290	2015 PF_{294}	—	August 10, 2004	Socorro	LINEAR	T_{j} (2.94)	3.2 km	MPC · JPL
473291	2015 PY_{304}	—	March 20, 2010	Mount Lemmon	Mount Lemmon Survey	PHO	970 m	MPC · JPL
473292	2015 PP_{305}	—	February 5, 2009	Kitt Peak	Spacewatch	·	2.1 km	MPC · JPL
473293	2015 PW_{306}	—	November 2, 2000	Kitt Peak	Spacewatch	·	1.8 km	MPC · JPL
473294	2015 PM_{310}	—	November 22, 2006	Mount Lemmon	Mount Lemmon Survey	·	2.7 km	MPC · JPL
473295	2015 QO	—	May 7, 2006	Kitt Peak	Spacewatch	EUN	1.5 km	MPC · JPL
473296	2015 QR_{10}	—	November 3, 2005	Mount Lemmon	Mount Lemmon Survey	·	760 m	MPC · JPL
473297	2015 RW_{10}	—	September 20, 2003	Kitt Peak	Spacewatch	KON	3.2 km	MPC · JPL
473298	2015 RV_{16}	—	September 9, 2004	Kitt Peak	Spacewatch	·	3.3 km	MPC · JPL
473299	2015 RJ_{17}	—	November 9, 2004	Catalina	CSS	·	1.5 km	MPC · JPL
473300	2015 RF_{25}	—	January 28, 2000	Kitt Peak	Spacewatch	·	1.0 km	MPC · JPL

== 473301–473400 ==
back to top

Designation			Discovery			Properties		Ref
Permanent	Provisional	Named after	Date	Site	Discoverer(s)	Category	Diam.	Ref
473301	2015 RA_{27}	—	October 6, 2000	Kitt Peak	Spacewatch	V	670 m	MPC · JPL
473302	2015 RX_{34}	—	September 15, 2004	Kitt Peak	Spacewatch	MAS	760 m	MPC · JPL
473303	2015 RC_{56}	—	September 17, 2010	Mount Lemmon	Mount Lemmon Survey	·	2.4 km	MPC · JPL
473304	2015 RV_{70}	—	April 25, 2003	Kitt Peak	Spacewatch	·	2.6 km	MPC · JPL
473305	2015 RK_{84}	—	October 8, 2004	Socorro	LINEAR	·	3.9 km	MPC · JPL
473306	2015 RT_{87}	—	November 19, 2008	Mount Lemmon	Mount Lemmon Survey	·	1.3 km	MPC · JPL
473307	2015 RO_{88}	—	June 21, 2010	Mount Lemmon	Mount Lemmon Survey	·	2.1 km	MPC · JPL
473308	2015 RM_{89}	—	November 11, 2010	Catalina	CSS	·	3.5 km	MPC · JPL
473309	2015 RO_{92}	—	September 20, 2011	Kitt Peak	Spacewatch	·	1.9 km	MPC · JPL
473310	2015 RR_{96}	—	September 19, 2001	Socorro	LINEAR	·	820 m	MPC · JPL
473311	2015 RE_{101}	—	August 12, 2004	Campo Imperatore	CINEOS	·	1.1 km	MPC · JPL
473312	2015 RH_{104}	—	November 20, 2003	Kitt Peak	Spacewatch	·	1.4 km	MPC · JPL
473313	2015 RD_{105}	—	October 25, 2005	Kitt Peak	Spacewatch	EOS	1.9 km	MPC · JPL
473314	2015 RW_{106}	—	September 29, 2011	Mount Lemmon	Mount Lemmon Survey	·	1.7 km	MPC · JPL
473315	2015 RU_{108}	—	October 7, 2004	Socorro	LINEAR	HYG	3.0 km	MPC · JPL
473316	2015 RG_{118}	—	August 29, 2006	Kitt Peak	Spacewatch	EUN	1.3 km	MPC · JPL
473317	2015 RN_{122}	—	November 20, 2008	Kitt Peak	Spacewatch	·	1.6 km	MPC · JPL
473318	2015 RP_{185}	—	March 9, 2007	Mount Lemmon	Mount Lemmon Survey	·	3.3 km	MPC · JPL
473319	2015 RC_{222}	—	March 26, 2008	Mount Lemmon	Mount Lemmon Survey	·	2.0 km	MPC · JPL
473320	2015 RB_{224}	—	April 20, 2007	Mount Lemmon	Mount Lemmon Survey	·	2.9 km	MPC · JPL
473321	2015 RJ_{240}	—	December 28, 2011	Catalina	CSS	EUN	1.5 km	MPC · JPL
473322	2015 SW_{2}	—	December 16, 2004	Anderson Mesa	LONEOS	T_{j} (2.99)	3.7 km	MPC · JPL
473323	2015 SO_{10}	—	February 19, 2009	Kitt Peak	Spacewatch	·	1.7 km	MPC · JPL
473324	2015 SW_{17}	—	October 9, 2004	Kitt Peak	Spacewatch	NYS	1.2 km	MPC · JPL
473325	2015 SR_{19}	—	September 15, 2009	Kitt Peak	Spacewatch	·	3.2 km	MPC · JPL
473326	2015 TY_{6}	—	September 10, 2010	Kitt Peak	Spacewatch	·	3.1 km	MPC · JPL
473327	2015 TZ_{6}	—	October 25, 2005	Anderson Mesa	LONEOS	·	860 m	MPC · JPL
473328	2015 TV_{12}	—	February 10, 1999	Kitt Peak	Spacewatch	GEF	1.6 km	MPC · JPL
473329	2015 TG_{69}	—	February 27, 2006	Kitt Peak	Spacewatch	·	2.8 km	MPC · JPL
473330	2015 TE_{82}	—	October 2, 2006	Kitt Peak	Spacewatch	·	1.8 km	MPC · JPL
473331	2015 TO_{85}	—	August 27, 2005	Kitt Peak	Spacewatch	·	660 m	MPC · JPL
473332	2015 TD_{91}	—	November 8, 2007	Mount Lemmon	Mount Lemmon Survey	H	560 m	MPC · JPL
473333	2015 TC_{104}	—	October 4, 2007	Mount Lemmon	Mount Lemmon Survey	·	1.2 km	MPC · JPL
473334	2015 TF_{104}	—	October 9, 2004	Kitt Peak	Spacewatch	·	2.5 km	MPC · JPL
473335	2015 TD_{107}	—	December 31, 2007	Catalina	CSS	·	1.3 km	MPC · JPL
473336	2015 TR_{109}	—	October 27, 2008	Mount Lemmon	Mount Lemmon Survey	·	750 m	MPC · JPL
473337	2015 TS_{110}	—	October 27, 2005	Mount Lemmon	Mount Lemmon Survey	·	720 m	MPC · JPL
473338	2015 TM_{122}	—	December 14, 2003	Kitt Peak	Spacewatch	CYB	4.8 km	MPC · JPL
473339	2015 TP_{147}	—	October 8, 2004	Kitt Peak	Spacewatch	·	3.4 km	MPC · JPL
473340	2015 TO_{160}	—	September 14, 2007	Kitt Peak	Spacewatch	·	950 m	MPC · JPL
473341	2015 TK_{171}	—	September 18, 2001	Kitt Peak	Spacewatch	·	1.9 km	MPC · JPL
473342	2015 TZ_{171}	—	December 22, 2005	Kitt Peak	Spacewatch	·	2.8 km	MPC · JPL
473343	2015 TD_{189}	—	December 5, 2007	Mount Lemmon	Mount Lemmon Survey	·	3.3 km	MPC · JPL
473344	2015 TG_{190}	—	May 7, 2008	Kitt Peak	Spacewatch	·	2.7 km	MPC · JPL
473345	2015 TD_{193}	—	September 10, 2004	Kitt Peak	Spacewatch	·	2.8 km	MPC · JPL
473346	2015 TL_{193}	—	June 7, 2006	Siding Spring	SSS	EUN	1.5 km	MPC · JPL
473347	2015 TU_{193}	—	June 18, 2010	Mount Lemmon	Mount Lemmon Survey	WIT	1.3 km	MPC · JPL
473348	2015 TE_{197}	—	December 31, 2007	Kitt Peak	Spacewatch	·	3.7 km	MPC · JPL
473349	2015 TT_{204}	—	February 29, 2004	Kitt Peak	Spacewatch	WIT	930 m	MPC · JPL
473350	2015 TG_{205}	—	May 3, 2010	Kitt Peak	Spacewatch	·	1.5 km	MPC · JPL
473351	2015 TL_{209}	—	September 26, 2009	Mount Lemmon	Mount Lemmon Survey	·	3.0 km	MPC · JPL
473352	2015 TH_{216}	—	September 14, 1999	Kitt Peak	Spacewatch	3:2 · SHU	4.3 km	MPC · JPL
473353	2015 TQ_{233}	—	December 30, 2005	Kitt Peak	Spacewatch	·	3.5 km	MPC · JPL
473354	2015 TN_{242}	—	August 8, 2004	Socorro	LINEAR	·	2.2 km	MPC · JPL
473355	2015 TF_{244}	—	November 8, 2010	Kitt Peak	Spacewatch	·	2.2 km	MPC · JPL
473356	2015 TU_{247}	—	September 7, 2004	Kitt Peak	Spacewatch	·	2.4 km	MPC · JPL
473357	2015 TP_{249}	—	September 12, 2005	Kitt Peak	Spacewatch	·	2.0 km	MPC · JPL
473358	2015 TS_{252}	—	October 1, 2005	Kitt Peak	Spacewatch	·	3.2 km	MPC · JPL
473359	2015 TV_{256}	—	April 19, 2007	Kitt Peak	Spacewatch	·	2.7 km	MPC · JPL
473360	2015 TK_{265}	—	October 11, 2004	Kitt Peak	Spacewatch	·	2.5 km	MPC · JPL
473361	2015 TY_{266}	—	September 5, 2008	Kitt Peak	Spacewatch	·	940 m	MPC · JPL
473362	2015 TE_{282}	—	August 19, 2006	Kitt Peak	Spacewatch	·	1.4 km	MPC · JPL
473363	2015 TS_{292}	—	October 29, 1998	Kitt Peak	Spacewatch	·	3.9 km	MPC · JPL
473364	2015 TU_{296}	—	September 21, 2003	Kitt Peak	Spacewatch	·	930 m	MPC · JPL
473365	2015 TG_{303}	—	January 1, 2009	Mount Lemmon	Mount Lemmon Survey	·	1.4 km	MPC · JPL
473366	2015 TE_{304}	—	November 30, 2005	Kitt Peak	Spacewatch	EOS	2.2 km	MPC · JPL
473367	2015 TC_{312}	—	September 22, 2006	Catalina	CSS	·	2.2 km	MPC · JPL
473368	2015 TP_{331}	—	March 29, 2009	Catalina	CSS	·	2.8 km	MPC · JPL
473369	2015 UZ_{9}	—	October 9, 2004	Kitt Peak	Spacewatch	THM	2.0 km	MPC · JPL
473370	2015 UB_{12}	—	March 10, 2007	Mount Lemmon	Mount Lemmon Survey	·	3.4 km	MPC · JPL
473371	2015 UM_{12}	—	January 12, 2008	Mount Lemmon	Mount Lemmon Survey	·	2.2 km	MPC · JPL
473372	2015 UA_{17}	—	September 18, 2006	Kitt Peak	Spacewatch	WIT	1.0 km	MPC · JPL
473373	2015 UW_{17}	—	March 26, 2003	Kitt Peak	Spacewatch	·	2.8 km	MPC · JPL
473374	2015 UN_{38}	—	March 9, 2007	Mount Lemmon	Mount Lemmon Survey	EOS	1.9 km	MPC · JPL
473375	2015 UY_{45}	—	November 8, 2010	Kitt Peak	Spacewatch	·	2.2 km	MPC · JPL
473376	2015 UP_{49}	—	December 15, 2007	Kitt Peak	Spacewatch	MAR	1.0 km	MPC · JPL
473377	2015 UA_{54}	—	October 29, 1999	Kitt Peak	Spacewatch	·	2.6 km	MPC · JPL
473378	2015 UZ_{65}	—	September 27, 2006	Catalina	CSS	JUN	1.2 km	MPC · JPL
473379	2015 US_{66}	—	January 26, 2006	Kitt Peak	Spacewatch	·	2.9 km	MPC · JPL
473380	2015 UL_{72}	—	November 8, 2010	Mount Lemmon	Mount Lemmon Survey	EOS	2.3 km	MPC · JPL
473381	2015 UQ_{72}	—	November 20, 2001	Socorro	LINEAR	KOR	1.4 km	MPC · JPL
473382	2015 UX_{72}	—	October 21, 2006	Mount Lemmon	Mount Lemmon Survey	AGN	1.3 km	MPC · JPL
473383	2015 UQ_{73}	—	October 12, 2004	Kitt Peak	Spacewatch	·	2.3 km	MPC · JPL
473384	2015 UZ_{77}	—	October 29, 2006	Kitt Peak	Spacewatch	·	1.9 km	MPC · JPL
473385	2015 UL_{78}	—	October 3, 2010	Kitt Peak	Spacewatch	·	3.7 km	MPC · JPL
473386	2015 UL_{83}	—	October 22, 2006	Mount Lemmon	Mount Lemmon Survey	·	2.7 km	MPC · JPL
473387	2015 UX_{83}	—	October 23, 2004	Kitt Peak	Spacewatch	·	3.5 km	MPC · JPL
473388	2015 VW_{23}	—	February 27, 2006	Catalina	CSS	·	3.5 km	MPC · JPL
473389	2015 VC_{25}	—	May 5, 2008	Kitt Peak	Spacewatch	·	3.1 km	MPC · JPL
473390	2015 VF_{25}	—	January 2, 2011	Catalina	CSS	·	3.5 km	MPC · JPL
473391	2015 VC_{26}	—	November 4, 2004	Kitt Peak	Spacewatch	·	2.9 km	MPC · JPL
473392	2015 VH_{26}	—	October 4, 2004	Kitt Peak	Spacewatch	EOS	2.3 km	MPC · JPL
473393	2015 VG_{39}	—	December 14, 2010	Mount Lemmon	Mount Lemmon Survey	EOS	2.2 km	MPC · JPL
473394	2015 VK_{40}	—	November 12, 2010	Mount Lemmon	Mount Lemmon Survey	·	1.8 km	MPC · JPL
473395	2015 VX_{40}	—	September 15, 2004	Kitt Peak	Spacewatch	·	2.6 km	MPC · JPL
473396	2015 VF_{41}	—	September 17, 2009	Catalina	CSS	·	4.3 km	MPC · JPL
473397	2015 VT_{41}	—	August 29, 2006	Kitt Peak	Spacewatch	EUN	1.1 km	MPC · JPL
473398	2015 VX_{51}	—	May 26, 2008	Kitt Peak	Spacewatch	·	3.1 km	MPC · JPL
473399	2015 VD_{63}	—	October 27, 2005	Anderson Mesa	LONEOS	·	770 m	MPC · JPL
473400	2015 VN_{71}	—	February 3, 2012	Mount Lemmon	Mount Lemmon Survey	·	3.6 km	MPC · JPL

== 473401–473500 ==
back to top

Designation			Discovery			Properties		Ref
Permanent	Provisional	Named after	Date	Site	Discoverer(s)	Category	Diam.	Ref
473401	2015 VP_{74}	—	October 8, 2008	Mount Lemmon	Mount Lemmon Survey	·	900 m	MPC · JPL
473402	2015 VQ_{88}	—	September 10, 2007	Kitt Peak	Spacewatch	·	1.6 km	MPC · JPL
473403	2015 VQ_{93}	—	January 1, 2009	Mount Lemmon	Mount Lemmon Survey	·	1.1 km	MPC · JPL
473404	2015 VM_{94}	—	January 14, 2011	Mount Lemmon	Mount Lemmon Survey	·	2.7 km	MPC · JPL
473405	2015 VM_{96}	—	October 13, 2006	Kitt Peak	Spacewatch	·	2.2 km	MPC · JPL
473406	2015 VY_{101}	—	October 14, 1998	Kitt Peak	Spacewatch	·	3.1 km	MPC · JPL
473407	2015 VA_{103}	—	November 4, 2004	Catalina	CSS	·	1.5 km	MPC · JPL
473408	2015 VG_{112}	—	April 5, 2009	Kitt Peak	Spacewatch	KON	2.7 km	MPC · JPL
473409	2015 VH_{113}	—	January 13, 2005	Kitt Peak	Spacewatch	·	1 km	MPC · JPL
473410	2015 VY_{116}	—	September 15, 2009	Kitt Peak	Spacewatch	·	3.1 km	MPC · JPL
473411	2015 VK_{117}	—	October 6, 2004	Kitt Peak	Spacewatch	EOS	2.1 km	MPC · JPL
473412	2015 VR_{117}	—	November 29, 2000	Kitt Peak	Spacewatch	EOS	2.2 km	MPC · JPL
473413	2015 VY_{117}	—	December 8, 1998	Kitt Peak	Spacewatch	·	2.9 km	MPC · JPL
473414	2015 VE_{118}	—	May 28, 2008	Mount Lemmon	Mount Lemmon Survey	·	2.9 km	MPC · JPL
473415	2015 VN_{118}	—	March 3, 2009	Catalina	CSS	·	1.5 km	MPC · JPL
473416	2015 VB_{120}	—	September 22, 2004	Kitt Peak	Spacewatch	·	2.3 km	MPC · JPL
473417	2015 VS_{123}	—	November 4, 2004	Kitt Peak	Spacewatch	·	3.3 km	MPC · JPL
473418	2015 VV_{124}	—	November 12, 2007	Mount Lemmon	Mount Lemmon Survey	ADE	1.8 km	MPC · JPL
473419	2015 VW_{128}	—	May 1, 2009	Kitt Peak	Spacewatch	(18466)	2.4 km	MPC · JPL
473420	2015 VQ_{129}	—	October 23, 2006	Mount Lemmon	Mount Lemmon Survey	AEO	990 m	MPC · JPL
473421	2015 VE_{131}	—	October 31, 2008	Catalina	CSS	PHO	2.0 km	MPC · JPL
473422	2015 VJ_{135}	—	October 9, 2010	Kitt Peak	Spacewatch	·	2.2 km	MPC · JPL
473423	2015 VU_{135}	—	December 27, 2011	Mount Lemmon	Mount Lemmon Survey	·	1.3 km	MPC · JPL
473424	2015 VE_{137}	—	August 13, 2010	Kitt Peak	Spacewatch	·	1.3 km	MPC · JPL
473425	2015 VE_{141}	—	November 15, 2010	Mount Lemmon	Mount Lemmon Survey	EMA	3.0 km	MPC · JPL
473426	2015 VG_{141}	—	November 15, 2006	Catalina	CSS	·	1.7 km	MPC · JPL
473427	2015 VM_{141}	—	September 17, 2009	Catalina	CSS	·	3.7 km	MPC · JPL
473428	2015 VR_{141}	—	July 21, 2010	WISE	WISE	·	1.7 km	MPC · JPL
473429	2015 VR_{143}	—	January 2, 2006	Catalina	CSS	·	3.3 km	MPC · JPL
473430	2015 VG_{149}	—	September 25, 2006	Catalina	CSS	EUN	1.2 km	MPC · JPL
473431	2015 WS_{3}	—	March 19, 2009	Mount Lemmon	Mount Lemmon Survey	·	1.3 km	MPC · JPL
473432	2015 WC_{5}	—	October 22, 2005	Kitt Peak	Spacewatch	KOR	1.5 km	MPC · JPL
473433	2015 WH_{7}	—	November 3, 2004	Anderson Mesa	LONEOS	·	2.6 km	MPC · JPL
473434	2015 WK_{7}	—	December 6, 2005	Kitt Peak	Spacewatch	EOS	2.0 km	MPC · JPL
473435	2015 WE_{12}	—	November 6, 2005	Kitt Peak	Spacewatch	·	640 m	MPC · JPL
473436	2015 WN_{14}	—	January 3, 2009	Mount Lemmon	Mount Lemmon Survey	·	2.0 km	MPC · JPL
473437	2015 WV_{14}	—	November 21, 2008	Kitt Peak	Spacewatch	V	720 m	MPC · JPL
473438	2015 WC_{15}	—	February 3, 2012	Mount Lemmon	Mount Lemmon Survey	GEF	1.2 km	MPC · JPL
473439	2015 WH_{15}	—	April 3, 2000	Kitt Peak	Spacewatch	·	1.3 km	MPC · JPL
473440	2015 XK	—	December 31, 2008	Kitt Peak	Spacewatch	·	1.1 km	MPC · JPL
473441	2015 XD_{2}	—	June 24, 2012	Mount Lemmon	Mount Lemmon Survey	H	620 m	MPC · JPL
473442	2015 XE_{2}	—	December 10, 2004	Kitt Peak	Spacewatch	·	3.6 km	MPC · JPL
473443	2015 XR_{2}	—	May 10, 2010	WISE	WISE	·	2.3 km	MPC · JPL
473444	2015 XT_{2}	—	September 14, 2007	Catalina	CSS	·	1.8 km	MPC · JPL
473445	2015 XP_{3}	—	March 11, 2008	Siding Spring	SSS	·	2.1 km	MPC · JPL
473446	2015 XR_{3}	—	September 2, 2010	Mount Lemmon	Mount Lemmon Survey	GEF	1.4 km	MPC · JPL
473447	2015 XK_{4}	—	April 25, 2007	Mount Lemmon	Mount Lemmon Survey	·	5.9 km	MPC · JPL
473448	2015 XT_{5}	—	April 30, 2009	Kitt Peak	Spacewatch	EUN	960 m	MPC · JPL
473449	2015 XV_{9}	—	March 17, 2004	Kitt Peak	Spacewatch	·	1.4 km	MPC · JPL
473450	2015 XQ_{10}	—	January 10, 2011	Mount Lemmon	Mount Lemmon Survey	·	4.2 km	MPC · JPL
473451	2015 XU_{12}	—	December 6, 2010	Catalina	CSS	·	2.2 km	MPC · JPL
473452	2015 XG_{26}	—	January 27, 2012	Mount Lemmon	Mount Lemmon Survey	AGN	1.1 km	MPC · JPL
473453	2015 XW_{30}	—	December 1, 2005	Kitt Peak	Spacewatch	V	690 m	MPC · JPL
473454	2015 XQ_{35}	—	January 31, 2006	Kitt Peak	Spacewatch	·	2.3 km	MPC · JPL
473455	2015 XP_{45}	—	February 17, 2001	Kitt Peak	Spacewatch	·	1.1 km	MPC · JPL
473456	2015 XE_{46}	—	September 24, 2009	Mount Lemmon	Mount Lemmon Survey	·	2.4 km	MPC · JPL
473457	2015 XV_{51}	—	January 6, 2006	Socorro	LINEAR	·	3.9 km	MPC · JPL
473458	2015 XA_{55}	—	January 15, 2008	Mount Lemmon	Mount Lemmon Survey	·	3.5 km	MPC · JPL
473459	2015 XF_{56}	—	April 30, 2009	Kitt Peak	Spacewatch	·	1.2 km	MPC · JPL
473460	2015 XQ_{56}	—	April 25, 2007	Mount Lemmon	Mount Lemmon Survey	·	2.3 km	MPC · JPL
473461	2015 XT_{56}	—	May 5, 2008	Kitt Peak	Spacewatch	·	1.5 km	MPC · JPL
473462	2015 XA_{58}	—	September 30, 2009	Mount Lemmon	Mount Lemmon Survey	·	3.1 km	MPC · JPL
473463	2015 XL_{59}	—	December 22, 2005	Kitt Peak	Spacewatch	·	3.0 km	MPC · JPL
473464	2015 XM_{59}	—	September 18, 2009	Kitt Peak	Spacewatch	·	3.0 km	MPC · JPL
473465	2015 XQ_{59}	—	January 16, 2011	Mount Lemmon	Mount Lemmon Survey	·	2.9 km	MPC · JPL
473466	2015 XY_{59}	—	April 4, 2008	Kitt Peak	Spacewatch	·	1.8 km	MPC · JPL
473467	2015 XU_{62}	—	December 19, 2009	Mount Lemmon	Mount Lemmon Survey	·	800 m	MPC · JPL
473468	2015 XS_{64}	—	April 11, 2007	Kitt Peak	Spacewatch	·	2.8 km	MPC · JPL
473469	2015 XC_{65}	—	September 11, 2010	Kitt Peak	Spacewatch	AGN	850 m	MPC · JPL
473470	2015 XE_{66}	—	December 11, 2006	Kitt Peak	Spacewatch	·	1.7 km	MPC · JPL
473471	2015 XF_{66}	—	October 19, 2006	Kitt Peak	Spacewatch	EUN	1.3 km	MPC · JPL
473472	2015 XH_{66}	—	December 11, 2004	Campo Imperatore	CINEOS	·	2.8 km	MPC · JPL
473473	2015 XR_{69}	—	December 18, 2007	Mount Lemmon	Mount Lemmon Survey	MAR	990 m	MPC · JPL
473474	2015 XC_{70}	—	July 18, 2006	Siding Spring	SSS	EUN	1.8 km	MPC · JPL
473475	2015 XG_{71}	—	July 21, 2004	Siding Spring	SSS	PHO	980 m	MPC · JPL
473476	2015 XS_{72}	—	May 2, 2003	Kitt Peak	Spacewatch	·	1.1 km	MPC · JPL
473477	2015 XG_{75}	—	October 27, 1998	Kitt Peak	Spacewatch	·	2.3 km	MPC · JPL
473478	2015 XG_{76}	—	September 18, 2003	Kitt Peak	Spacewatch	·	3.0 km	MPC · JPL
473479	2015 XE_{80}	—	January 15, 2005	Kitt Peak	Spacewatch	·	1.1 km	MPC · JPL
473480	2015 XJ_{81}	—	September 18, 2009	Kitt Peak	Spacewatch	EOS	1.7 km	MPC · JPL
473481	2015 XF_{82}	—	January 29, 2010	WISE	WISE	·	4.5 km	MPC · JPL
473482	2015 XN_{82}	—	January 10, 2008	Kitt Peak	Spacewatch	EUN	840 m	MPC · JPL
473483	2015 XA_{83}	—	October 1, 2010	Mount Lemmon	Mount Lemmon Survey	·	1.9 km	MPC · JPL
473484	2015 XM_{84}	—	April 8, 2006	Kitt Peak	Spacewatch	·	4.6 km	MPC · JPL
473485	2015 XN_{85}	—	March 2, 2006	Kitt Peak	Spacewatch	·	2.9 km	MPC · JPL
473486	2015 XV_{86}	—	April 10, 2005	Catalina	CSS	·	1.3 km	MPC · JPL
473487	2015 XW_{86}	—	April 13, 2013	Mount Lemmon	Mount Lemmon Survey	·	1.6 km	MPC · JPL
473488	2015 XQ_{87}	—	April 21, 2006	Kitt Peak	Spacewatch	·	2.9 km	MPC · JPL
473489	2015 XA_{90}	—	October 31, 2008	Kitt Peak	Spacewatch	·	700 m	MPC · JPL
473490	2015 XQ_{94}	—	December 14, 2010	Mount Lemmon	Mount Lemmon Survey	EOS	1.5 km	MPC · JPL
473491	2015 XP_{97}	—	April 25, 2007	Kitt Peak	Spacewatch	·	2.4 km	MPC · JPL
473492	2015 XF_{102}	—	November 15, 2010	Mount Lemmon	Mount Lemmon Survey	·	3.4 km	MPC · JPL
473493	2015 XU_{103}	—	January 25, 2009	Kitt Peak	Spacewatch	·	940 m	MPC · JPL
473494	2015 XV_{104}	—	December 5, 2007	Mount Lemmon	Mount Lemmon Survey	·	1.1 km	MPC · JPL
473495	2015 XX_{106}	—	February 9, 2008	Kitt Peak	Spacewatch	·	1.6 km	MPC · JPL
473496	2015 XU_{113}	—	May 8, 2005	Mount Lemmon	Mount Lemmon Survey	EUN	1.4 km	MPC · JPL
473497	2015 XJ_{116}	—	March 16, 2007	Kitt Peak	Spacewatch	·	1.8 km	MPC · JPL
473498	2015 XP_{122}	—	October 18, 2003	Kitt Peak	Spacewatch	·	2.5 km	MPC · JPL
473499	2015 XJ_{123}	—	March 6, 2008	Mount Lemmon	Mount Lemmon Survey	·	1.4 km	MPC · JPL
473500	2015 XA_{129}	—	October 22, 2009	Mount Lemmon	Mount Lemmon Survey	·	3.0 km	MPC · JPL

== 473501–473600 ==
back to top

Designation			Discovery			Properties		Ref
Permanent	Provisional	Named after	Date	Site	Discoverer(s)	Category	Diam.	Ref
473501	2015 XL_{131}	—	September 15, 2009	Kitt Peak	Spacewatch	·	1.8 km	MPC · JPL
473502	2015 XT_{131}	—	November 6, 2010	Kitt Peak	Spacewatch	·	2.1 km	MPC · JPL
473503 Minoruozima	2015 XE_{132}	Minoruozima	October 26, 2008	Kitt Peak	Spacewatch	·	710 m	MPC · JPL
473504	2015 XL_{134}	—	May 30, 2003	Cerro Tololo	Deep Ecliptic Survey	KOR	1.1 km	MPC · JPL
473505	2015 XY_{134}	—	September 30, 2010	Mount Lemmon	Mount Lemmon Survey	·	1.4 km	MPC · JPL
473506	2015 XC_{136}	—	October 24, 2009	Kitt Peak	Spacewatch	HYG	2.9 km	MPC · JPL
473507	2015 XP_{136}	—	October 25, 2005	Mount Lemmon	Mount Lemmon Survey	·	700 m	MPC · JPL
473508	2015 XR_{136}	—	December 13, 2006	Kitt Peak	Spacewatch	·	2.0 km	MPC · JPL
473509	2015 XL_{137}	—	December 14, 2007	Mount Lemmon	Mount Lemmon Survey	·	1.1 km	MPC · JPL
473510	2015 XL_{138}	—	March 12, 2007	Mount Lemmon	Mount Lemmon Survey	·	2.7 km	MPC · JPL
473511	2015 XJ_{139}	—	October 10, 2007	Mount Lemmon	Mount Lemmon Survey	NYS	970 m	MPC · JPL
473512	2015 XZ_{139}	—	August 29, 2005	Campo Imperatore	CINEOS	·	2.6 km	MPC · JPL
473513	2015 XD_{140}	—	December 1, 2008	Mount Lemmon	Mount Lemmon Survey	·	1.1 km	MPC · JPL
473514	2015 XW_{141}	—	October 23, 2009	Mount Lemmon	Mount Lemmon Survey	·	2.4 km	MPC · JPL
473515	2015 XE_{144}	—	December 10, 2004	Kitt Peak	Spacewatch	·	3.2 km	MPC · JPL
473516	2015 XO_{144}	—	December 10, 2010	Mount Lemmon	Mount Lemmon Survey	·	2.5 km	MPC · JPL
473517	2015 XY_{144}	—	October 8, 2004	Kitt Peak	Spacewatch	·	2.6 km	MPC · JPL
473518	2015 XN_{146}	—	December 4, 2005	Mount Lemmon	Mount Lemmon Survey	·	720 m	MPC · JPL
473519	2015 XU_{146}	—	November 4, 2005	Mount Lemmon	Mount Lemmon Survey	·	2.1 km	MPC · JPL
473520	2015 XN_{147}	—	December 18, 2001	Socorro	LINEAR	·	740 m	MPC · JPL
473521	2015 XP_{147}	—	October 8, 2007	Mount Lemmon	Mount Lemmon Survey	MAS	810 m	MPC · JPL
473522	2015 XW_{147}	—	September 27, 2009	Kitt Peak	Spacewatch	·	1.6 km	MPC · JPL
473523	2015 XZ_{147}	—	April 27, 2006	Kitt Peak	Spacewatch	THM	2.2 km	MPC · JPL
473524	2015 XC_{148}	—	September 17, 2009	Mount Lemmon	Mount Lemmon Survey	·	1.5 km	MPC · JPL
473525	2015 XO_{148}	—	September 23, 2011	Kitt Peak	Spacewatch	V	740 m	MPC · JPL
473526	2015 XG_{152}	—	September 19, 2006	Anderson Mesa	LONEOS	·	2.0 km	MPC · JPL
473527	2015 XA_{161}	—	January 5, 2006	Socorro	LINEAR	·	3.2 km	MPC · JPL
473528	2015 XW_{165}	—	February 17, 2007	Catalina	CSS	·	2.0 km	MPC · JPL
473529	2015 XO_{166}	—	September 25, 2009	Mount Lemmon	Mount Lemmon Survey	·	1.9 km	MPC · JPL
473530	2015 XO_{167}	—	December 10, 2009	Mount Lemmon	Mount Lemmon Survey	URS	4.0 km	MPC · JPL
473531	2015 XU_{167}	—	October 16, 2006	Kitt Peak	Spacewatch	·	1.8 km	MPC · JPL
473532	2015 XC_{168}	—	November 26, 2009	Kitt Peak	Spacewatch	·	1.1 km	MPC · JPL
473533	2015 XK_{170}	—	April 11, 2007	Kitt Peak	Spacewatch	·	2.0 km	MPC · JPL
473534	2015 XP_{170}	—	September 4, 2010	Mount Lemmon	Mount Lemmon Survey	·	1.4 km	MPC · JPL
473535	2015 XS_{170}	—	October 2, 2006	Mount Lemmon	Mount Lemmon Survey	·	1.5 km	MPC · JPL
473536	2015 XZ_{170}	—	November 5, 2010	Mount Lemmon	Mount Lemmon Survey	·	2.3 km	MPC · JPL
473537	2015 XP_{171}	—	December 31, 1999	Kitt Peak	Spacewatch	·	1.2 km	MPC · JPL
473538	2015 XR_{171}	—	November 12, 2010	Mount Lemmon	Mount Lemmon Survey	·	2.2 km	MPC · JPL
473539	2015 XC_{172}	—	October 22, 2006	Catalina	CSS	EUN	1.3 km	MPC · JPL
473540	2015 XN_{173}	—	March 15, 2007	Catalina	CSS	·	2.5 km	MPC · JPL
473541	2015 XJ_{185}	—	January 1, 2009	Kitt Peak	Spacewatch	V	630 m	MPC · JPL
473542	2015 XV_{188}	—	January 3, 2000	Kitt Peak	Spacewatch	·	1.2 km	MPC · JPL
473543	2015 XO_{191}	—	April 6, 2000	Kitt Peak	Spacewatch	EUN	1.2 km	MPC · JPL
473544	2015 XB_{192}	—	March 3, 2006	Kitt Peak	Spacewatch	MAS	810 m	MPC · JPL
473545	2015 XO_{193}	—	December 16, 2007	Kitt Peak	Spacewatch	·	910 m	MPC · JPL
473546	2015 XG_{195}	—	December 13, 2006	Kitt Peak	Spacewatch	·	2.4 km	MPC · JPL
473547	2015 XX_{195}	—	January 14, 2002	Kitt Peak	Spacewatch	·	660 m	MPC · JPL
473548	2015 XP_{196}	—	July 9, 2010	WISE	WISE	·	2.5 km	MPC · JPL
473549	2015 XS_{196}	—	July 29, 2008	Mount Lemmon	Mount Lemmon Survey	EOS	2.5 km	MPC · JPL
473550	2015 XB_{197}	—	April 11, 2013	Mount Lemmon	Mount Lemmon Survey	·	1.8 km	MPC · JPL
473551	2015 XL_{197}	—	December 9, 2006	Kitt Peak	Spacewatch	·	1.6 km	MPC · JPL
473552	2015 XL_{201}	—	December 25, 2010	Mount Lemmon	Mount Lemmon Survey	·	2.9 km	MPC · JPL
473553	2015 XQ_{201}	—	November 5, 2010	Kitt Peak	Spacewatch	·	2.2 km	MPC · JPL
473554	2015 XH_{202}	—	January 12, 2002	Kitt Peak	Spacewatch	KOR	1.3 km	MPC · JPL
473555	2015 XP_{203}	—	October 22, 2006	Kitt Peak	Spacewatch	·	1.5 km	MPC · JPL
473556	2015 XU_{203}	—	October 17, 2009	Mount Lemmon	Mount Lemmon Survey	HYG	2.0 km	MPC · JPL
473557	2015 XF_{206}	—	November 17, 1999	Kitt Peak	Spacewatch	EOS	1.7 km	MPC · JPL
473558	2015 XJ_{207}	—	January 9, 1997	Kitt Peak	Spacewatch	NYS	1.0 km	MPC · JPL
473559	2015 XC_{210}	—	November 3, 2005	Mount Lemmon	Mount Lemmon Survey	·	1.9 km	MPC · JPL
473560	2015 XQ_{211}	—	April 15, 1994	Kitt Peak	Spacewatch	·	730 m	MPC · JPL
473561	2015 XN_{212}	—	March 1, 2009	Kitt Peak	Spacewatch	·	1.1 km	MPC · JPL
473562	2015 XL_{213}	—	September 30, 2009	Mount Lemmon	Mount Lemmon Survey	(21885)	3.1 km	MPC · JPL
473563	2015 XO_{214}	—	November 24, 2006	Kitt Peak	Spacewatch	·	2.7 km	MPC · JPL
473564	2015 XE_{216}	—	August 27, 2006	Anderson Mesa	LONEOS	·	1.9 km	MPC · JPL
473565	2015 XP_{216}	—	January 29, 2011	Kitt Peak	Spacewatch	·	2.1 km	MPC · JPL
473566	2015 XA_{217}	—	January 27, 2010	WISE	WISE	VER	5.0 km	MPC · JPL
473567	2015 XK_{217}	—	May 1, 1997	Kitt Peak	Spacewatch	·	950 m	MPC · JPL
473568	2015 XD_{219}	—	October 18, 2006	Kitt Peak	Spacewatch	·	1.7 km	MPC · JPL
473569	2015 XG_{220}	—	March 8, 2008	Kitt Peak	Spacewatch	·	1.8 km	MPC · JPL
473570	2015 XG_{221}	—	February 10, 2008	Kitt Peak	Spacewatch	·	1.5 km	MPC · JPL
473571	2015 XW_{222}	—	December 29, 2008	Mount Lemmon	Mount Lemmon Survey	·	1.5 km	MPC · JPL
473572	2015 XC_{223}	—	July 28, 2008	Mount Lemmon	Mount Lemmon Survey	·	3.2 km	MPC · JPL
473573	2015 XC_{224}	—	May 16, 2007	Kitt Peak	Spacewatch	·	3.1 km	MPC · JPL
473574	2015 XP_{226}	—	November 1, 2005	Mount Lemmon	Mount Lemmon Survey	·	1.8 km	MPC · JPL
473575	2015 XL_{228}	—	December 29, 2005	Mount Lemmon	Mount Lemmon Survey	·	1.5 km	MPC · JPL
473576	2015 XS_{228}	—	November 12, 2006	Mount Lemmon	Mount Lemmon Survey	·	1.4 km	MPC · JPL
473577	2015 XR_{229}	—	September 20, 2003	Kitt Peak	Spacewatch	·	2.8 km	MPC · JPL
473578	2015 XD_{230}	—	July 5, 2005	Siding Spring	SSS	·	3.1 km	MPC · JPL
473579	2015 XD_{231}	—	January 3, 2012	Mount Lemmon	Mount Lemmon Survey	·	1.1 km	MPC · JPL
473580	2015 XW_{233}	—	November 11, 2010	Mount Lemmon	Mount Lemmon Survey	KOR	1.2 km	MPC · JPL
473581	2015 XS_{234}	—	November 30, 2005	Kitt Peak	Spacewatch	·	620 m	MPC · JPL
473582	2015 XZ_{234}	—	February 13, 2008	Mount Lemmon	Mount Lemmon Survey	·	1.9 km	MPC · JPL
473583	2015 XE_{235}	—	November 30, 2005	Kitt Peak	Spacewatch	·	1.8 km	MPC · JPL
473584	2015 XQ_{236}	—	September 21, 2009	Mount Lemmon	Mount Lemmon Survey	·	2.6 km	MPC · JPL
473585	2015 XT_{237}	—	October 29, 2008	Mount Lemmon	Mount Lemmon Survey	CYB	4.9 km	MPC · JPL
473586	2015 XU_{237}	—	January 23, 2006	Kitt Peak	Spacewatch	·	3.0 km	MPC · JPL
473587	2015 XK_{238}	—	October 27, 2005	Kitt Peak	Spacewatch	KOR	1.1 km	MPC · JPL
473588	2015 XO_{238}	—	September 23, 2006	Kitt Peak	Spacewatch	·	1.2 km	MPC · JPL
473589	2015 XV_{242}	—	November 1, 2005	Mount Lemmon	Mount Lemmon Survey	KOR	1.4 km	MPC · JPL
473590	2015 XR_{243}	—	January 28, 2007	Mount Lemmon	Mount Lemmon Survey	KOR	1.1 km	MPC · JPL
473591	2015 XB_{245}	—	December 15, 2009	Catalina	CSS	·	3.8 km	MPC · JPL
473592	2015 XO_{245}	—	October 18, 2003	Kitt Peak	Spacewatch	(5651)	3.9 km	MPC · JPL
473593	2015 XQ_{245}	—	December 14, 2010	Mount Lemmon	Mount Lemmon Survey	·	2.1 km	MPC · JPL
473594	2015 XR_{245}	—	November 20, 2003	Kitt Peak	Spacewatch	·	2.4 km	MPC · JPL
473595	2015 XU_{245}	—	May 8, 2005	Mount Lemmon	Mount Lemmon Survey	·	1.9 km	MPC · JPL
473596	2015 XA_{246}	—	February 21, 2012	Mount Lemmon	Mount Lemmon Survey	EUN	1.4 km	MPC · JPL
473597	2015 XH_{257}	—	May 3, 2013	Siding Spring	SSS	·	3.6 km	MPC · JPL
473598	2015 XD_{258}	—	September 4, 2010	Kitt Peak	Spacewatch	·	1.4 km	MPC · JPL
473599	2015 XK_{258}	—	December 14, 2004	Kitt Peak	Spacewatch	URS	5.3 km	MPC · JPL
473600	2015 XU_{258}	—	November 26, 2005	Mount Lemmon	Mount Lemmon Survey	KOR	1.3 km	MPC · JPL

== 473601–473700 ==
back to top

Designation			Discovery			Properties		Ref
Permanent	Provisional	Named after	Date	Site	Discoverer(s)	Category	Diam.	Ref
473601	2015 XJ_{259}	—	February 3, 2008	Kitt Peak	Spacewatch	·	1.1 km	MPC · JPL
473602	2015 XW_{260}	—	June 5, 2010	WISE	WISE	CYB	4.4 km	MPC · JPL
473603	2015 XY_{262}	—	April 29, 2009	Kitt Peak	Spacewatch	·	1.8 km	MPC · JPL
473604	2015 XX_{264}	—	August 21, 2003	Campo Imperatore	CINEOS	·	3.1 km	MPC · JPL
473605	2015 XZ_{264}	—	November 4, 2004	Kitt Peak	Spacewatch	·	4.1 km	MPC · JPL
473606	2015 XT_{265}	—	November 19, 2008	Mount Lemmon	Mount Lemmon Survey	·	1.1 km	MPC · JPL
473607	2015 XB_{266}	—	September 19, 2003	Kitt Peak	Spacewatch	·	2.5 km	MPC · JPL
473608	2015 XV_{268}	—	October 1, 2010	Mount Lemmon	Mount Lemmon Survey	(12739)	1.4 km	MPC · JPL
473609	2015 XB_{269}	—	February 21, 2007	Mount Lemmon	Mount Lemmon Survey	KOR	1.3 km	MPC · JPL
473610	2015 XK_{273}	—	September 29, 2009	Mount Lemmon	Mount Lemmon Survey	EOS	1.9 km	MPC · JPL
473611	2015 XX_{273}	—	November 26, 2012	Mount Lemmon	Mount Lemmon Survey	·	900 m	MPC · JPL
473612	2015 XS_{274}	—	May 11, 2007	Mount Lemmon	Mount Lemmon Survey	·	2.6 km	MPC · JPL
473613	2015 XT_{274}	—	November 16, 2009	Mount Lemmon	Mount Lemmon Survey	HYG	2.9 km	MPC · JPL
473614	2015 XA_{276}	—	January 31, 2006	Kitt Peak	Spacewatch	·	1.9 km	MPC · JPL
473615	2015 XP_{276}	—	May 29, 2008	Mount Lemmon	Mount Lemmon Survey	·	4.0 km	MPC · JPL
473616	2015 XT_{277}	—	June 30, 2008	Kitt Peak	Spacewatch	·	3.5 km	MPC · JPL
473617	2015 XV_{278}	—	January 26, 2001	Kitt Peak	Spacewatch	·	1.0 km	MPC · JPL
473618	2015 XD_{279}	—	September 19, 2009	Mount Lemmon	Mount Lemmon Survey	THM	1.7 km	MPC · JPL
473619	2015 XO_{279}	—	August 13, 2013	Kitt Peak	Spacewatch	L5	7.3 km	MPC · JPL
473620	2015 XZ_{284}	—	December 30, 2007	Kitt Peak	Spacewatch	·	1.3 km	MPC · JPL
473621	2015 XA_{287}	—	October 30, 2005	Mount Lemmon	Mount Lemmon Survey	·	2.0 km	MPC · JPL
473622	2015 XJ_{289}	—	January 17, 2005	Kitt Peak	Spacewatch	MAS	590 m	MPC · JPL
473623	2015 XA_{292}	—	October 4, 2004	Kitt Peak	Spacewatch	·	830 m	MPC · JPL
473624	2015 XL_{293}	—	December 26, 2005	Kitt Peak	Spacewatch	·	1.6 km	MPC · JPL
473625	2015 XO_{293}	—	January 15, 2005	Kitt Peak	Spacewatch	·	970 m	MPC · JPL
473626	2015 XU_{297}	—	September 27, 2006	Kitt Peak	Spacewatch	·	1.3 km	MPC · JPL
473627	2015 XT_{298}	—	December 4, 2008	Mount Lemmon	Mount Lemmon Survey	·	1.1 km	MPC · JPL
473628	2015 XS_{306}	—	April 2, 2006	Kitt Peak	Spacewatch	·	3.3 km	MPC · JPL
473629	2015 XC_{308}	—	February 1, 2010	WISE	WISE	·	2.9 km	MPC · JPL
473630	2015 XX_{308}	—	October 15, 2004	Mount Lemmon	Mount Lemmon Survey	·	2.9 km	MPC · JPL
473631	2015 XC_{309}	—	October 11, 2010	Kitt Peak	Spacewatch	·	3.4 km	MPC · JPL
473632	2015 XN_{309}	—	October 14, 2009	Mount Lemmon	Mount Lemmon Survey	·	2.4 km	MPC · JPL
473633	2015 XK_{310}	—	November 25, 2005	Kitt Peak	Spacewatch	·	2.2 km	MPC · JPL
473634	2015 XL_{311}	—	June 22, 2006	Kitt Peak	Spacewatch	·	1.3 km	MPC · JPL
473635	2015 XX_{312}	—	May 19, 2004	Kitt Peak	Spacewatch	·	2.3 km	MPC · JPL
473636	2015 XP_{313}	—	December 15, 2004	Kitt Peak	Spacewatch	·	3.5 km	MPC · JPL
473637	2015 XC_{314}	—	September 21, 2011	Catalina	CSS	·	1.2 km	MPC · JPL
473638	2015 XR_{314}	—	August 5, 2010	WISE	WISE	·	2.1 km	MPC · JPL
473639	2015 XN_{315}	—	January 25, 2009	Kitt Peak	Spacewatch	MAS	650 m	MPC · JPL
473640	2015 XC_{316}	—	September 1, 2006	Molėtai	K. Černis, J. Zdanavičius	(5)	1.3 km	MPC · JPL
473641	2015 XO_{316}	—	November 12, 2006	Mount Lemmon	Mount Lemmon Survey	WIT	1.1 km	MPC · JPL
473642	2015 XS_{318}	—	October 17, 2010	Mount Lemmon	Mount Lemmon Survey	HOF	2.1 km	MPC · JPL
473643	2015 XD_{321}	—	December 6, 2010	Mount Lemmon	Mount Lemmon Survey	·	4.2 km	MPC · JPL
473644	2015 XA_{322}	—	January 30, 2006	Kitt Peak	Spacewatch	·	1.7 km	MPC · JPL
473645	2015 XQ_{322}	—	October 18, 2006	Kitt Peak	Spacewatch	·	2.1 km	MPC · JPL
473646	2015 XU_{325}	—	March 2, 2009	Kitt Peak	Spacewatch	·	2.6 km	MPC · JPL
473647	2015 XL_{327}	—	September 19, 2009	Kitt Peak	Spacewatch	·	2.1 km	MPC · JPL
473648	2015 XC_{330}	—	January 28, 2007	Mount Lemmon	Mount Lemmon Survey	KOR	1.7 km	MPC · JPL
473649	2015 XN_{332}	—	September 25, 2009	Mount Lemmon	Mount Lemmon Survey	·	2.3 km	MPC · JPL
473650	2015 XS_{332}	—	December 7, 2005	Kitt Peak	Spacewatch	·	2.2 km	MPC · JPL
473651	2015 XL_{334}	—	January 8, 2000	Kitt Peak	Spacewatch	·	880 m	MPC · JPL
473652	2015 XV_{334}	—	October 28, 2005	Mount Lemmon	Mount Lemmon Survey	·	2.1 km	MPC · JPL
473653	2015 XA_{335}	—	October 4, 2003	Kitt Peak	Spacewatch	·	3.2 km	MPC · JPL
473654	2015 XD_{335}	—	October 23, 2004	Kitt Peak	Spacewatch	·	1.3 km	MPC · JPL
473655	2015 XF_{337}	—	September 7, 2004	Kitt Peak	Spacewatch	·	850 m	MPC · JPL
473656	2015 XW_{337}	—	November 1, 2005	Mount Lemmon	Mount Lemmon Survey	·	2.1 km	MPC · JPL
473657	2015 XZ_{337}	—	October 22, 2006	Kitt Peak	Spacewatch	·	1.2 km	MPC · JPL
473658	2015 XB_{342}	—	December 14, 2006	Mount Lemmon	Mount Lemmon Survey	·	1.8 km	MPC · JPL
473659	2015 XM_{343}	—	November 17, 2004	Campo Imperatore	CINEOS	EOS	2.0 km	MPC · JPL
473660	2015 XP_{343}	—	October 23, 2009	Mount Lemmon	Mount Lemmon Survey	·	2.8 km	MPC · JPL
473661	2015 XK_{344}	—	October 3, 2008	Mount Lemmon	Mount Lemmon Survey	·	640 m	MPC · JPL
473662	2015 XX_{344}	—	July 30, 2000	Socorro	LINEAR	·	1.2 km	MPC · JPL
473663	2015 XJ_{347}	—	February 2, 2008	Catalina	CSS	·	2.0 km	MPC · JPL
473664	2015 XS_{347}	—	January 31, 2006	Kitt Peak	Spacewatch	·	1.9 km	MPC · JPL
473665	2015 XT_{347}	—	November 4, 2005	Mount Lemmon	Mount Lemmon Survey	KOR	1.1 km	MPC · JPL
473666	2015 XA_{348}	—	January 17, 2009	Kitt Peak	Spacewatch	NYS	1.0 km	MPC · JPL
473667	2015 XE_{348}	—	January 26, 2010	WISE	WISE	·	3.3 km	MPC · JPL
473668	2015 XA_{350}	—	December 6, 2010	Kitt Peak	Spacewatch	EOS	2.2 km	MPC · JPL
473669	2015 XD_{350}	—	September 27, 2011	Kitt Peak	Spacewatch	·	1.3 km	MPC · JPL
473670	2015 XP_{350}	—	April 15, 2007	Catalina	CSS	EOS	2.6 km	MPC · JPL
473671	2015 XB_{351}	—	November 30, 2008	Kitt Peak	Spacewatch	·	1.1 km	MPC · JPL
473672	2015 XH_{353}	—	December 26, 2005	Mount Lemmon	Mount Lemmon Survey	·	1.4 km	MPC · JPL
473673	2015 XB_{355}	—	December 3, 2004	Kitt Peak	Spacewatch	·	3.5 km	MPC · JPL
473674	2015 XE_{355}	—	November 30, 2005	Mount Lemmon	Mount Lemmon Survey	·	2.7 km	MPC · JPL
473675	2015 XT_{355}	—	October 28, 1994	Kitt Peak	Spacewatch	·	1.1 km	MPC · JPL
473676	2015 XT_{356}	—	February 21, 2003	Palomar	NEAT	·	2.1 km	MPC · JPL
473677	2015 XZ_{364}	—	November 28, 1999	Kitt Peak	Spacewatch	EOS	1.7 km	MPC · JPL
473678	2015 XH_{368}	—	December 29, 2005	Kitt Peak	Spacewatch	EOS	1.5 km	MPC · JPL
473679	2015 XY_{369}	—	November 29, 2005	Kitt Peak	Spacewatch	·	1.6 km	MPC · JPL
473680	2015 XH_{370}	—	September 11, 2010	Mount Lemmon	Mount Lemmon Survey	·	1.4 km	MPC · JPL
473681	2015 XM_{372}	—	October 31, 2010	Mount Lemmon	Mount Lemmon Survey	·	2.0 km	MPC · JPL
473682	2015 XZ_{373}	—	October 13, 2010	Kitt Peak	Spacewatch	EOS	2.4 km	MPC · JPL
473683	2015 XU_{374}	—	November 12, 2007	Mount Lemmon	Mount Lemmon Survey	(5)	1.2 km	MPC · JPL
473684	2015 XU_{379}	—	April 4, 2008	Kitt Peak	Spacewatch	L5	8.8 km	MPC · JPL
473685	2015 XZ_{379}	—	February 15, 2010	WISE	WISE	·	4.4 km	MPC · JPL
473686	2015 XG_{380}	—	January 10, 2011	Mount Lemmon	Mount Lemmon Survey	VER	2.8 km	MPC · JPL
473687	2015 XL_{380}	—	September 2, 2010	Mount Lemmon	Mount Lemmon Survey	·	1.4 km	MPC · JPL
473688	2015 XM_{380}	—	October 16, 2003	Palomar	NEAT	·	3.8 km	MPC · JPL
473689	2015 XP_{380}	—	November 11, 2007	Mount Lemmon	Mount Lemmon Survey	H	650 m	MPC · JPL
473690	2015 XG_{381}	—	May 9, 2007	Mount Lemmon	Mount Lemmon Survey	·	3.5 km	MPC · JPL
473691	2015 XY_{382}	—	September 27, 2008	Mount Lemmon	Mount Lemmon Survey	·	4.2 km	MPC · JPL
473692	2015 XN_{384}	—	October 15, 2009	Catalina	CSS	·	3.4 km	MPC · JPL
473693	2015 YW	—	March 18, 2001	Kitt Peak	Spacewatch	EUN	2.0 km	MPC · JPL
473694	2015 YU_{3}	—	September 30, 2005	Mount Lemmon	Mount Lemmon Survey	·	510 m	MPC · JPL
473695	2015 YL_{4}	—	December 14, 2004	Socorro	LINEAR	·	1.5 km	MPC · JPL
473696	2015 YA_{5}	—	September 27, 2011	Mount Lemmon	Mount Lemmon Survey	·	1.5 km	MPC · JPL
473697	2015 YM_{6}	—	February 9, 1997	Kitt Peak	Spacewatch	·	1.7 km	MPC · JPL
473698	2015 YP_{6}	—	December 2, 2004	Catalina	CSS	·	4.5 km	MPC · JPL
473699	2015 YR_{6}	—	September 19, 2006	Kitt Peak	Spacewatch	·	1.3 km	MPC · JPL
473700	2015 YS_{6}	—	December 11, 2004	Kitt Peak	Spacewatch	·	3.5 km	MPC · JPL

== 473701–473800 ==
back to top

Designation			Discovery			Properties		Ref
Permanent	Provisional	Named after	Date	Site	Discoverer(s)	Category	Diam.	Ref
473701	2015 YT_{6}	—	February 16, 2010	WISE	WISE	·	5.4 km	MPC · JPL
473702	2015 YL_{8}	—	December 14, 2001	Socorro	LINEAR	·	560 m	MPC · JPL
473703	2015 YP_{8}	—	November 24, 2003	Kitt Peak	Spacewatch	·	3.5 km	MPC · JPL
473704	2015 YQ_{8}	—	March 26, 2010	WISE	WISE	·	2.7 km	MPC · JPL
473705	2015 YW_{8}	—	December 3, 2004	Kitt Peak	Spacewatch	·	2.6 km	MPC · JPL
473706	2015 YX_{8}	—	December 13, 2006	Kitt Peak	Spacewatch	·	1.8 km	MPC · JPL
473707	2015 YK_{9}	—	November 19, 2007	Mount Lemmon	Mount Lemmon Survey	MAR	1.1 km	MPC · JPL
473708	2015 YA_{11}	—	September 22, 2009	Catalina	CSS	NAE	2.8 km	MPC · JPL
473709	2015 YC_{11}	—	March 3, 2005	Catalina	CSS	·	1.3 km	MPC · JPL
473710	2015 YD_{16}	—	March 10, 2010	WISE	WISE	·	4.0 km	MPC · JPL
473711	2015 YR_{16}	—	July 9, 2010	WISE	WISE	·	2.9 km	MPC · JPL
473712	2015 YG_{17}	—	February 13, 2012	Kitt Peak	Spacewatch	·	1.3 km	MPC · JPL
473713	2015 YF_{18}	—	September 24, 2008	Mount Lemmon	Mount Lemmon Survey	·	540 m	MPC · JPL
473714	2015 YH_{18}	—	September 20, 2003	Kitt Peak	Spacewatch	·	3.3 km	MPC · JPL
473715	2015 YR_{18}	—	October 25, 2011	XuYi	PMO NEO Survey Program	PHO	960 m	MPC · JPL
473716	2015 YV_{18}	—	December 13, 2006	Mount Lemmon	Mount Lemmon Survey	·	2.2 km	MPC · JPL
473717	2015 YW_{18}	—	January 13, 2005	Kitt Peak	Spacewatch	ERI	1.5 km	MPC · JPL
473718	2015 YU_{20}	—	April 26, 2010	WISE	WISE	L5	9.5 km	MPC · JPL
473719	2016 AA	—	December 5, 2003	Socorro	LINEAR	·	2.9 km	MPC · JPL
473720	2016 AP_{3}	—	May 26, 2007	Mount Lemmon	Mount Lemmon Survey	·	4.1 km	MPC · JPL
473721	2016 AY_{116}	—	October 10, 2007	Mount Lemmon	Mount Lemmon Survey	MAS	540 m	MPC · JPL
473722	2016 AF_{119}	—	January 25, 2009	Kitt Peak	Spacewatch	·	790 m	MPC · JPL
473723	2016 AS_{121}	—	December 30, 2008	Mount Lemmon	Mount Lemmon Survey	V	640 m	MPC · JPL
473724	2016 AV_{131}	—	October 1, 2005	Mount Lemmon	Mount Lemmon Survey	·	1.5 km	MPC · JPL
473725	2016 BX_{6}	—	December 18, 2009	Kitt Peak	Spacewatch	·	3.0 km	MPC · JPL
473726	2016 BU_{12}	—	November 30, 1997	Kitt Peak	Spacewatch	·	1.2 km	MPC · JPL
473727	2016 BO_{81}	—	March 3, 2005	Catalina	CSS	·	2.6 km	MPC · JPL
473728	2016 CR_{27}	—	October 14, 2007	Mount Lemmon	Mount Lemmon Survey	V	730 m	MPC · JPL
473729	2016 CE_{58}	—	May 8, 2005	Kitt Peak	Spacewatch	·	1.0 km	MPC · JPL
473730	2016 CG_{123}	—	January 9, 2006	Kitt Peak	Spacewatch	·	590 m	MPC · JPL
473731	2016 CQ_{189}	—	November 22, 2014	Mount Lemmon	Mount Lemmon Survey	·	1.6 km	MPC · JPL
473732	2016 CY_{200}	—	February 9, 2005	Mount Lemmon	Mount Lemmon Survey	·	3.0 km	MPC · JPL
473733	2016 CZ_{204}	—	February 19, 2001	Socorro	LINEAR	NYS	1.4 km	MPC · JPL
473734	2016 CL_{222}	—	December 30, 2007	Kitt Peak	Spacewatch	·	1.4 km	MPC · JPL
473735	2016 CG_{256}	—	November 27, 2011	Kitt Peak	Spacewatch	·	980 m	MPC · JPL
473736	2016 CB_{261}	—	October 27, 2009	Kitt Peak	Spacewatch	·	1.6 km	MPC · JPL
473737	2016 DE_{22}	—	March 11, 2005	Mount Lemmon	Mount Lemmon Survey	·	3.1 km	MPC · JPL
473738	2016 DV_{24}	—	May 31, 2006	Kitt Peak	Spacewatch	·	2.8 km	MPC · JPL
473739	2016 DU_{25}	—	March 23, 2006	Catalina	CSS	EOS	2.7 km	MPC · JPL
473740	2016 DB_{28}	—	March 4, 2005	Catalina	CSS	T_{j} (2.97)	4.4 km	MPC · JPL
473741	2016 ES_{4}	—	July 29, 2008	Mount Lemmon	Mount Lemmon Survey	·	2.1 km	MPC · JPL
473742	2016 EV_{4}	—	November 27, 2010	Mount Lemmon	Mount Lemmon Survey	(5)	1.1 km	MPC · JPL
473743	2016 EW_{4}	—	April 13, 2005	Kitt Peak	Spacewatch	·	1.1 km	MPC · JPL
473744	2016 EA_{5}	—	January 16, 2004	Kitt Peak	Spacewatch	NYS	1.2 km	MPC · JPL
473745	2016 EA_{7}	—	October 22, 2006	Mount Lemmon	Mount Lemmon Survey	·	1.9 km	MPC · JPL
473746	2016 EO_{9}	—	February 21, 2007	Kitt Peak	Spacewatch	·	1.6 km	MPC · JPL
473747	2016 EZ_{10}	—	December 9, 2010	Mount Lemmon	Mount Lemmon Survey	·	1.8 km	MPC · JPL
473748	2016 EB_{11}	—	September 27, 2009	Kitt Peak	Spacewatch	·	2.5 km	MPC · JPL
473749	2016 EW_{12}	—	March 17, 2005	Catalina	CSS	THB	3.7 km	MPC · JPL
473750	2016 EJ_{15}	—	April 30, 2010	WISE	WISE	·	3.5 km	MPC · JPL
473751	2016 EK_{17}	—	November 9, 2008	Mount Lemmon	Mount Lemmon Survey	·	3.5 km	MPC · JPL
473752	2016 EL_{17}	—	January 8, 2010	Catalina	CSS	·	4.8 km	MPC · JPL
473753	2016 EB_{18}	—	July 12, 2013	Siding Spring	SSS	·	1.7 km	MPC · JPL
473754	2016 EC_{30}	—	January 16, 2005	Kitt Peak	Spacewatch	·	4.7 km	MPC · JPL
473755	2016 EY_{32}	—	November 7, 2010	Catalina	CSS	·	1.7 km	MPC · JPL
473756	2016 EZ_{32}	—	March 29, 2012	Mount Lemmon	Mount Lemmon Survey	·	1.2 km	MPC · JPL
473757	2016 EB_{37}	—	September 22, 2009	Kitt Peak	Spacewatch	MAR	980 m	MPC · JPL
473758	2016 ES_{37}	—	March 15, 2007	Catalina	CSS	JUN	1.0 km	MPC · JPL
473759	2016 EH_{45}	—	September 23, 2008	Mount Lemmon	Mount Lemmon Survey	·	3.0 km	MPC · JPL
473760	2016 EC_{46}	—	December 25, 2005	Kitt Peak	Spacewatch	·	2.0 km	MPC · JPL
473761	2016 EG_{50}	—	November 29, 2005	Catalina	CSS	·	2.2 km	MPC · JPL
473762	2016 EX_{53}	—	October 14, 2007	Kitt Peak	Spacewatch	VER	3.1 km	MPC · JPL
473763	2016 EL_{54}	—	February 26, 2007	Mount Lemmon	Mount Lemmon Survey	·	2.1 km	MPC · JPL
473764	2016 EP_{54}	—	February 19, 2010	Mount Lemmon	Mount Lemmon Survey	EOS	1.9 km	MPC · JPL
473765	2016 EV_{57}	—	April 4, 2005	Mount Lemmon	Mount Lemmon Survey	MAS	820 m	MPC · JPL
473766	2016 EE_{58}	—	December 13, 2010	Mount Lemmon	Mount Lemmon Survey	·	1.6 km	MPC · JPL
473767	2016 EN_{59}	—	September 20, 2001	Socorro	LINEAR	·	590 m	MPC · JPL
473768	2016 EQ_{60}	—	February 28, 2008	Kitt Peak	Spacewatch	·	1.1 km	MPC · JPL
473769	2016 EJ_{65}	—	March 18, 2010	Mount Lemmon	Mount Lemmon Survey	VER	2.4 km	MPC · JPL
473770	2016 ES_{65}	—	October 18, 2007	Kitt Peak	Spacewatch	·	2.7 km	MPC · JPL
473771	2016 EU_{68}	—	November 19, 2008	Catalina	CSS	·	2.9 km	MPC · JPL
473772	2016 EP_{70}	—	April 14, 2005	Kitt Peak	Spacewatch	·	3.2 km	MPC · JPL
473773	2016 EK_{73}	—	October 21, 2006	Mount Lemmon	Mount Lemmon Survey	·	1.2 km	MPC · JPL
473774	2016 EG_{76}	—	April 20, 2006	Kitt Peak	Spacewatch	(1338) (FLO)	490 m	MPC · JPL
473775	2016 EM_{77}	—	February 21, 2006	Mount Lemmon	Mount Lemmon Survey	·	1.7 km	MPC · JPL
473776	2016 EQ_{78}	—	April 2, 2005	Siding Spring	SSS	THB	2.7 km	MPC · JPL
473777	2016 EW_{78}	—	September 21, 2009	Mount Lemmon	Mount Lemmon Survey	·	2.5 km	MPC · JPL
473778	2016 EO_{79}	—	March 27, 2003	Anderson Mesa	LONEOS	·	2.2 km	MPC · JPL
473779	2016 EX_{79}	—	April 6, 2008	Mount Lemmon	Mount Lemmon Survey	·	1.4 km	MPC · JPL
473780	2016 EH_{80}	—	November 17, 2009	Mount Lemmon	Mount Lemmon Survey	·	2.7 km	MPC · JPL
473781	2016 EA_{81}	—	March 27, 2011	Mount Lemmon	Mount Lemmon Survey	·	2.6 km	MPC · JPL
473782	2016 EY_{81}	—	February 5, 2011	Mount Lemmon	Mount Lemmon Survey	EOS	2.1 km	MPC · JPL
473783	2016 EF_{82}	—	February 5, 2011	Mount Lemmon	Mount Lemmon Survey	EOS	2.1 km	MPC · JPL
473784	2016 EM_{82}	—	October 11, 2007	Catalina	CSS	·	850 m	MPC · JPL
473785	2016 EX_{85}	—	September 17, 2004	Socorro	LINEAR	H	600 m	MPC · JPL
473786	2016 EB_{87}	—	April 10, 2005	Kitt Peak	Spacewatch	·	1.1 km	MPC · JPL
473787	2016 EE_{87}	—	September 23, 2008	Mount Lemmon	Mount Lemmon Survey	·	2.4 km	MPC · JPL
473788	2016 EO_{87}	—	December 2, 2010	Mount Lemmon	Mount Lemmon Survey	·	1.2 km	MPC · JPL
473789	2016 EV_{87}	—	March 17, 2010	Kitt Peak	Spacewatch	·	3.1 km	MPC · JPL
473790	2016 EY_{87}	—	November 8, 2007	Mount Lemmon	Mount Lemmon Survey	·	810 m	MPC · JPL
473791	2016 EZ_{87}	—	February 24, 1998	Kitt Peak	Spacewatch	·	3.5 km	MPC · JPL
473792	2016 EN_{88}	—	September 30, 2005	Mount Lemmon	Mount Lemmon Survey	·	1.7 km	MPC · JPL
473793	2016 EH_{89}	—	March 5, 2002	Kitt Peak	Spacewatch	·	1.5 km	MPC · JPL
473794	2016 EK_{89}	—	September 15, 2010	Kitt Peak	Spacewatch	·	1.2 km	MPC · JPL
473795	2016 EG_{90}	—	September 10, 2007	Mount Lemmon	Mount Lemmon Survey	·	2.9 km	MPC · JPL
473796	2016 EY_{90}	—	December 21, 2006	Kitt Peak	Spacewatch	KON	2.8 km	MPC · JPL
473797	2016 EY_{91}	—	March 12, 2005	Kitt Peak	Spacewatch	·	4.8 km	MPC · JPL
473798	2016 EZ_{91}	—	August 27, 2009	Kitt Peak	Spacewatch	·	1.7 km	MPC · JPL
473799	2016 EK_{92}	—	March 27, 2011	Mount Lemmon	Mount Lemmon Survey	·	3.5 km	MPC · JPL
473800	2016 EM_{95}	—	November 1, 2010	Mount Lemmon	Mount Lemmon Survey	·	1.2 km	MPC · JPL

== 473801–473900 ==
back to top

Designation			Discovery			Properties		Ref
Permanent	Provisional	Named after	Date	Site	Discoverer(s)	Category	Diam.	Ref
473801	2016 EF_{97}	—	January 6, 2010	Kitt Peak	Spacewatch	·	3.1 km	MPC · JPL
473802	2016 EH_{101}	—	April 6, 2008	Kitt Peak	Spacewatch	·	1.4 km	MPC · JPL
473803	2016 EB_{106}	—	June 19, 2009	Kitt Peak	Spacewatch	·	1.9 km	MPC · JPL
473804	2016 ED_{106}	—	February 17, 2007	Kitt Peak	Spacewatch	·	1.5 km	MPC · JPL
473805	2016 EG_{108}	—	November 13, 2007	Mount Lemmon	Mount Lemmon Survey	·	1.2 km	MPC · JPL
473806	2016 EM_{108}	—	March 1, 2009	Kitt Peak	Spacewatch	·	980 m	MPC · JPL
473807	2016 EU_{108}	—	February 15, 2010	WISE	WISE	·	3.9 km	MPC · JPL
473808	2016 EK_{109}	—	January 6, 2010	Kitt Peak	Spacewatch	·	2.8 km	MPC · JPL
473809	2016 EV_{109}	—	October 4, 2007	Kitt Peak	Spacewatch	·	5.3 km	MPC · JPL
473810	2016 EF_{110}	—	November 25, 2005	Mount Lemmon	Mount Lemmon Survey	AEO	1.0 km	MPC · JPL
473811	2016 EN_{110}	—	December 1, 2008	Mount Lemmon	Mount Lemmon Survey	·	730 m	MPC · JPL
473812	2016 EQ_{110}	—	September 22, 2008	Kitt Peak	Spacewatch	·	2.7 km	MPC · JPL
473813	2016 EB_{111}	—	September 16, 2003	Kitt Peak	Spacewatch	·	790 m	MPC · JPL
473814	2016 EO_{111}	—	March 14, 2007	Mount Lemmon	Mount Lemmon Survey	·	2.6 km	MPC · JPL
473815	2016 EJ_{112}	—	September 21, 2009	Mount Lemmon	Mount Lemmon Survey	NEM	2.4 km	MPC · JPL
473816	2016 EK_{112}	—	February 19, 2010	Mount Lemmon	Mount Lemmon Survey	·	2.7 km	MPC · JPL
473817	2016 EX_{113}	—	December 17, 2009	Mount Lemmon	Mount Lemmon Survey	·	3.0 km	MPC · JPL
473818	2016 EA_{114}	—	September 11, 2007	Mount Lemmon	Mount Lemmon Survey	·	3.6 km	MPC · JPL
473819	2016 EF_{114}	—	February 2, 2006	Mount Lemmon	Mount Lemmon Survey	KOR	1.1 km	MPC · JPL
473820	2016 EH_{114}	—	March 11, 2008	Mount Lemmon	Mount Lemmon Survey	·	1.2 km	MPC · JPL
473821	2016 EX_{114}	—	February 9, 2005	Kitt Peak	Spacewatch	THM	2.6 km	MPC · JPL
473822	2016 EJ_{115}	—	May 2, 2006	Kitt Peak	Spacewatch	·	2.8 km	MPC · JPL
473823	2016 EM_{115}	—	June 10, 2007	Kitt Peak	Spacewatch	·	2.4 km	MPC · JPL
473824	2016 EB_{116}	—	March 3, 2005	Catalina	CSS	·	3.1 km	MPC · JPL
473825	2016 EO_{116}	—	April 30, 2013	Kitt Peak	Spacewatch	·	570 m	MPC · JPL
473826	2016 ER_{116}	—	March 25, 2010	WISE	WISE	·	2.1 km	MPC · JPL
473827	2016 EX_{116}	—	August 24, 2007	Kitt Peak	Spacewatch	·	5.7 km	MPC · JPL
473828	2016 ES_{117}	—	March 23, 2004	Kitt Peak	Spacewatch	CYB	3.7 km	MPC · JPL
473829	2016 ED_{120}	—	May 21, 2012	Mount Lemmon	Mount Lemmon Survey	·	2.1 km	MPC · JPL
473830	2016 EO_{122}	—	October 18, 2009	Mount Lemmon	Mount Lemmon Survey	AGN	970 m	MPC · JPL
473831	2016 EA_{124}	—	February 16, 2010	Mount Lemmon	Mount Lemmon Survey	·	3.2 km	MPC · JPL
473832	2016 EB_{124}	—	September 23, 2009	Kitt Peak	Spacewatch	·	1.8 km	MPC · JPL
473833	2016 EF_{124}	—	November 30, 2005	Kitt Peak	Spacewatch	PAD	1.7 km	MPC · JPL
473834	2016 EK_{124}	—	November 18, 2003	Kitt Peak	Spacewatch	·	1.4 km	MPC · JPL
473835	2016 ET_{124}	—	September 19, 2008	Kitt Peak	Spacewatch	·	2.0 km	MPC · JPL
473836	2016 EU_{124}	—	September 3, 2008	Kitt Peak	Spacewatch	·	1.8 km	MPC · JPL
473837	2016 EV_{124}	—	January 8, 2010	Mount Lemmon	Mount Lemmon Survey	·	2.4 km	MPC · JPL
473838	2016 EM_{125}	—	April 17, 2010	WISE	WISE	·	2.4 km	MPC · JPL
473839	2016 EB_{126}	—	April 12, 2004	Kitt Peak	Spacewatch	·	1.2 km	MPC · JPL
473840	2016 EM_{126}	—	September 2, 2013	Mount Lemmon	Mount Lemmon Survey	KOR	1.2 km	MPC · JPL
473841	2016 EO_{126}	—	November 11, 2001	Kitt Peak	Spacewatch	·	1.5 km	MPC · JPL
473842	2016 EQ_{126}	—	October 1, 2013	Mount Lemmon	Mount Lemmon Survey	HYG	2.5 km	MPC · JPL
473843	2016 ES_{126}	—	October 10, 1999	Kitt Peak	Spacewatch	KOR	1.2 km	MPC · JPL
473844	2016 EW_{127}	—	March 9, 2005	Mount Lemmon	Mount Lemmon Survey	·	1.1 km	MPC · JPL
473845	2016 EM_{128}	—	March 8, 2005	Mount Lemmon	Mount Lemmon Survey	·	3.7 km	MPC · JPL
473846	2016 EW_{129}	—	September 30, 2003	Kitt Peak	Spacewatch	KOR	1.2 km	MPC · JPL
473847	2016 EX_{129}	—	December 29, 2003	Kitt Peak	Spacewatch	V	490 m	MPC · JPL
473848	2016 EE_{130}	—	March 26, 2007	Kitt Peak	Spacewatch	·	1.6 km	MPC · JPL
473849	2016 EH_{130}	—	October 4, 2013	Mount Lemmon	Mount Lemmon Survey	·	2.6 km	MPC · JPL
473850	2016 EM_{130}	—	September 10, 2007	Mount Lemmon	Mount Lemmon Survey	·	2.9 km	MPC · JPL
473851	2016 ER_{130}	—	March 8, 2005	Mount Lemmon	Mount Lemmon Survey	·	3.7 km	MPC · JPL
473852	2016 ET_{130}	—	July 1, 2005	Kitt Peak	Spacewatch	·	1.0 km	MPC · JPL
473853	2016 EV_{130}	—	March 14, 2005	Mount Lemmon	Mount Lemmon Survey	·	1.0 km	MPC · JPL
473854	2016 EZ_{130}	—	November 16, 2003	Kitt Peak	Spacewatch	·	890 m	MPC · JPL
473855	2016 EB_{131}	—	April 13, 2001	Kitt Peak	Spacewatch	·	1.2 km	MPC · JPL
473856	2016 EM_{131}	—	October 4, 2004	Kitt Peak	Spacewatch	·	2.4 km	MPC · JPL
473857	2016 EE_{132}	—	January 27, 2006	Mount Lemmon	Mount Lemmon Survey	·	590 m	MPC · JPL
473858	2016 EL_{132}	—	September 18, 2003	Kitt Peak	Spacewatch	·	2.0 km	MPC · JPL
473859	2016 EY_{132}	—	August 27, 2009	Kitt Peak	Spacewatch	·	910 m	MPC · JPL
473860	2016 EL_{133}	—	January 26, 2006	Kitt Peak	Spacewatch	·	570 m	MPC · JPL
473861	2016 ES_{133}	—	January 18, 2015	Mount Lemmon	Mount Lemmon Survey	3:2 · (6124)	4.3 km	MPC · JPL
473862	2016 EX_{133}	—	May 18, 2010	WISE	WISE	·	3.8 km	MPC · JPL
473863	2016 EC_{134}	—	April 20, 2004	Kitt Peak	Spacewatch	·	920 m	MPC · JPL
473864	2016 EG_{134}	—	March 26, 2007	Mount Lemmon	Mount Lemmon Survey	NEM	2.2 km	MPC · JPL
473865	2016 EH_{134}	—	February 26, 2012	Kitt Peak	Spacewatch	·	1.3 km	MPC · JPL
473866	2016 ET_{134}	—	September 23, 2004	Kitt Peak	Spacewatch	·	1.2 km	MPC · JPL
473867	2016 EG_{135}	—	October 9, 2004	Kitt Peak	Spacewatch	AGN	1.3 km	MPC · JPL
473868	2016 EK_{135}	—	October 2, 2008	Kitt Peak	Spacewatch	KOR	1.4 km	MPC · JPL
473869	2016 EU_{135}	—	September 11, 2007	XuYi	PMO NEO Survey Program	·	2.9 km	MPC · JPL
473870	2016 EK_{136}	—	May 3, 2006	Mount Lemmon	Mount Lemmon Survey	·	1.5 km	MPC · JPL
473871	2016 EP_{136}	—	October 5, 2004	Kitt Peak	Spacewatch	·	2.5 km	MPC · JPL
473872	2016 EF_{137}	—	September 9, 2007	Mount Lemmon	Mount Lemmon Survey	THM	2.0 km	MPC · JPL
473873	2016 EA_{138}	—	April 11, 2005	Mount Lemmon	Mount Lemmon Survey	·	2.3 km	MPC · JPL
473874	2016 EK_{138}	—	December 31, 2005	Kitt Peak	Spacewatch	(13314)	1.7 km	MPC · JPL
473875	2016 EP_{138}	—	March 28, 2010	WISE	WISE	·	1.7 km	MPC · JPL
473876	2016 EC_{139}	—	January 31, 2009	Mount Lemmon	Mount Lemmon Survey	·	860 m	MPC · JPL
473877	2016 EM_{139}	—	August 30, 2002	Kitt Peak	Spacewatch	HYG	2.4 km	MPC · JPL
473878	2016 EY_{139}	—	October 12, 2006	Kitt Peak	Spacewatch	·	960 m	MPC · JPL
473879	2016 EH_{140}	—	January 14, 2008	Kitt Peak	Spacewatch	·	1.2 km	MPC · JPL
473880	2016 EX_{140}	—	November 25, 2006	Kitt Peak	Spacewatch	·	1.2 km	MPC · JPL
473881	2016 ED_{141}	—	February 27, 2009	Kitt Peak	Spacewatch	·	690 m	MPC · JPL
473882	2016 EF_{141}	—	March 17, 2005	Kitt Peak	Spacewatch	·	830 m	MPC · JPL
473883	2016 ER_{141}	—	October 8, 2008	Mount Lemmon	Mount Lemmon Survey	·	2.2 km	MPC · JPL
473884	2016 ER_{142}	—	March 17, 2007	Kitt Peak	Spacewatch	·	2.1 km	MPC · JPL
473885	2016 EX_{142}	—	October 2, 2003	Kitt Peak	Spacewatch	·	1.3 km	MPC · JPL
473886	2016 EK_{143}	—	February 27, 2006	Kitt Peak	Spacewatch	KOR	1.3 km	MPC · JPL
473887	2016 EG_{144}	—	January 25, 2006	Kitt Peak	Spacewatch	·	1.7 km	MPC · JPL
473888	2016 EK_{144}	—	April 2, 2005	Mount Lemmon	Mount Lemmon Survey	THM	2.0 km	MPC · JPL
473889	2016 EQ_{144}	—	October 8, 2007	Mount Lemmon	Mount Lemmon Survey	·	2.6 km	MPC · JPL
473890	2016 EK_{145}	—	September 18, 2006	Kitt Peak	Spacewatch	·	1.3 km	MPC · JPL
473891	2016 EL_{145}	—	March 3, 2010	WISE	WISE	·	1.9 km	MPC · JPL
473892	2016 ES_{145}	—	April 18, 2009	Kitt Peak	Spacewatch	V	570 m	MPC · JPL
473893	2016 ET_{145}	—	January 9, 1997	Kitt Peak	Spacewatch	AGN	1.3 km	MPC · JPL
473894	2016 ET_{146}	—	October 9, 2010	Mount Lemmon	Mount Lemmon Survey	·	780 m	MPC · JPL
473895	2016 EX_{146}	—	December 31, 2005	Kitt Peak	Spacewatch	AGN	1.2 km	MPC · JPL
473896	2016 EY_{146}	—	October 8, 2007	Mount Lemmon	Mount Lemmon Survey	·	800 m	MPC · JPL
473897	2016 EB_{147}	—	September 13, 2007	Mount Lemmon	Mount Lemmon Survey	·	3.1 km	MPC · JPL
473898	2016 EK_{147}	—	September 29, 2008	Catalina	CSS	·	2.5 km	MPC · JPL
473899	2016 EN_{147}	—	March 18, 2009	Catalina	CSS	·	2.0 km	MPC · JPL
473900	2016 EP_{147}	—	April 13, 2008	Kitt Peak	Spacewatch	·	1.4 km	MPC · JPL

== 473901–474000 ==
back to top

Designation			Discovery			Properties		Ref
Permanent	Provisional	Named after	Date	Site	Discoverer(s)	Category	Diam.	Ref
473901	2016 ER_{147}	—	January 17, 2007	Kitt Peak	Spacewatch	·	1.4 km	MPC · JPL
473902	2016 ED_{148}	—	December 20, 1995	Kitt Peak	Spacewatch	·	630 m	MPC · JPL
473903	2016 EE_{148}	—	November 2, 2008	Mount Lemmon	Mount Lemmon Survey	·	2.4 km	MPC · JPL
473904	2016 ET_{148}	—	March 3, 2000	Socorro	LINEAR	·	2.5 km	MPC · JPL
473905	2016 EB_{149}	—	October 23, 2009	Mount Lemmon	Mount Lemmon Survey	·	2.1 km	MPC · JPL
473906	2016 ER_{149}	—	October 30, 2008	Kitt Peak	Spacewatch	EOS	2.4 km	MPC · JPL
473907	2016 ES_{149}	—	February 27, 2006	Kitt Peak	Spacewatch	·	700 m	MPC · JPL
473908	2016 EZ_{149}	—	October 10, 2004	Kitt Peak	Spacewatch	·	2.1 km	MPC · JPL
473909	2016 EB_{150}	—	November 17, 2011	Mount Lemmon	Mount Lemmon Survey	·	610 m	MPC · JPL
473910	2016 EN_{150}	—	September 23, 2005	Kitt Peak	Spacewatch	·	1.2 km	MPC · JPL
473911	2016 EU_{150}	—	November 3, 2008	Kitt Peak	Spacewatch	·	1.8 km	MPC · JPL
473912	2016 EX_{150}	—	February 1, 2006	Mount Lemmon	Mount Lemmon Survey	·	580 m	MPC · JPL
473913	2016 ED_{151}	—	January 29, 2011	Mount Lemmon	Mount Lemmon Survey	·	1.2 km	MPC · JPL
473914	2016 EH_{151}	—	March 12, 2005	Kitt Peak	Spacewatch	·	3.0 km	MPC · JPL
473915	2016 EJ_{151}	—	April 15, 2008	Mount Lemmon	Mount Lemmon Survey	·	1.5 km	MPC · JPL
473916	2016 EU_{151}	—	April 1, 2005	Kitt Peak	Spacewatch	·	3.4 km	MPC · JPL
473917	2016 ED_{152}	—	March 4, 2006	Mount Lemmon	Mount Lemmon Survey	·	2.5 km	MPC · JPL
473918	2016 EN_{152}	—	September 10, 2007	Kitt Peak	Spacewatch	·	3.4 km	MPC · JPL
473919	2016 ES_{152}	—	September 29, 2009	Mount Lemmon	Mount Lemmon Survey	·	2.2 km	MPC · JPL
473920	2016 EX_{152}	—	October 18, 2003	Kitt Peak	Spacewatch	·	1.1 km	MPC · JPL
473921	2016 EU_{154}	—	March 25, 2006	Kitt Peak	Spacewatch	·	2.2 km	MPC · JPL
473922	2016 EE_{155}	—	October 30, 2008	Kitt Peak	Spacewatch	·	2.6 km	MPC · JPL
473923	2016 EH_{155}	—	April 11, 1999	Kitt Peak	Spacewatch	THM	2.2 km	MPC · JPL
473924	2016 EJ_{155}	—	February 27, 2006	Kitt Peak	Spacewatch	KOR	1.5 km	MPC · JPL
473925	2016 EL_{155}	—	October 3, 1999	Kitt Peak	Spacewatch	·	1.9 km	MPC · JPL
473926	2016 ES_{158}	—	January 28, 2004	Kitt Peak	Spacewatch	·	960 m	MPC · JPL
473927	2016 EM_{159}	—	October 18, 2006	Kitt Peak	Spacewatch	·	1 km	MPC · JPL
473928	2016 EK_{160}	—	October 3, 2013	Kitt Peak	Spacewatch	·	2.9 km	MPC · JPL
473929	2016 EX_{160}	—	October 1, 2005	Kitt Peak	Spacewatch	·	1.6 km	MPC · JPL
473930	2016 EK_{161}	—	November 19, 2009	Mount Lemmon	Mount Lemmon Survey	·	3.5 km	MPC · JPL
473931	2016 EM_{161}	—	September 25, 2006	Kitt Peak	Spacewatch	·	1.1 km	MPC · JPL
473932	2016 EF_{163}	—	February 3, 2000	Kitt Peak	Spacewatch	·	2.1 km	MPC · JPL
473933	2016 EG_{163}	—	March 3, 2005	Catalina	CSS	·	4.2 km	MPC · JPL
473934	2016 EQ_{163}	—	October 18, 2003	Kitt Peak	Spacewatch	EOS	2.2 km	MPC · JPL
473935	2016 ER_{163}	—	September 14, 2002	Kitt Peak	Spacewatch	·	4.1 km	MPC · JPL
473936	2016 EF_{166}	—	November 20, 2003	Kitt Peak	Spacewatch	EOS	1.8 km	MPC · JPL
473937	2016 EV_{166}	—	November 8, 2008	Mount Lemmon	Mount Lemmon Survey	THM	1.9 km	MPC · JPL
473938	2016 EW_{167}	—	April 12, 2011	Mount Lemmon	Mount Lemmon Survey	EOS	1.7 km	MPC · JPL
473939	2016 ED_{168}	—	September 3, 2008	Kitt Peak	Spacewatch	·	3.5 km	MPC · JPL
473940	2016 EH_{169}	—	September 26, 2009	Kitt Peak	Spacewatch	AGN	820 m	MPC · JPL
473941	2016 EP_{169}	—	October 27, 2005	Kitt Peak	Spacewatch	·	1.3 km	MPC · JPL
473942	2016 EY_{170}	—	November 20, 2003	Kitt Peak	Spacewatch	EOS	3.5 km	MPC · JPL
473943	2016 EG_{171}	—	February 3, 2009	Kitt Peak	Spacewatch	·	700 m	MPC · JPL
473944	2016 EL_{172}	—	June 7, 2008	Kitt Peak	Spacewatch	·	1.5 km	MPC · JPL
473945	2016 EP_{172}	—	March 13, 2007	Catalina	CSS	·	2.7 km	MPC · JPL
473946	2016 EY_{175}	—	August 28, 2005	Kitt Peak	Spacewatch	·	860 m	MPC · JPL
473947	2016 EU_{177}	—	November 6, 2008	Mount Lemmon	Mount Lemmon Survey	·	2.7 km	MPC · JPL
473948	2016 EY_{178}	—	January 29, 1998	Kitt Peak	Spacewatch	·	710 m	MPC · JPL
473949	2016 EF_{179}	—	October 10, 2007	Kitt Peak	Spacewatch	·	3.2 km	MPC · JPL
473950	2016 EK_{179}	—	September 21, 2008	Mount Lemmon	Mount Lemmon Survey	KOR	1.1 km	MPC · JPL
473951	2016 EQ_{179}	—	September 14, 2007	Mount Lemmon	Mount Lemmon Survey	·	2.5 km	MPC · JPL
473952	2016 ES_{179}	—	October 10, 2010	Kitt Peak	Spacewatch	·	710 m	MPC · JPL
473953	2016 EO_{180}	—	March 17, 2005	Kitt Peak	Spacewatch	·	1.1 km	MPC · JPL
473954	2016 EE_{181}	—	January 30, 2006	Kitt Peak	Spacewatch	KOR	1.4 km	MPC · JPL
473955	2016 EF_{181}	—	October 2, 1999	Kitt Peak	Spacewatch	·	2.1 km	MPC · JPL
473956	2016 EN_{181}	—	March 27, 2003	Kitt Peak	Spacewatch	·	1.4 km	MPC · JPL
473957	2016 EQ_{181}	—	March 29, 2012	Mount Lemmon	Mount Lemmon Survey	·	1.5 km	MPC · JPL
473958	2016 EE_{182}	—	March 27, 2003	Kitt Peak	Spacewatch	·	1.4 km	MPC · JPL
473959	2016 EX_{184}	—	March 17, 2002	Kitt Peak	Spacewatch	·	1.7 km	MPC · JPL
473960	2016 EK_{186}	—	December 8, 2010	Mount Lemmon	Mount Lemmon Survey	·	1.5 km	MPC · JPL
473961	2016 EL_{186}	—	March 10, 2005	Mount Lemmon	Mount Lemmon Survey	·	1.3 km	MPC · JPL
473962	2016 EE_{187}	—	December 25, 2010	Mount Lemmon	Mount Lemmon Survey	·	1.7 km	MPC · JPL
473963	2016 EX_{187}	—	October 29, 2008	Kitt Peak	Spacewatch	EOS	2.7 km	MPC · JPL
473964	2016 EA_{188}	—	January 10, 2010	Kitt Peak	Spacewatch	·	5.1 km	MPC · JPL
473965	2016 EE_{188}	—	January 2, 2012	Mount Lemmon	Mount Lemmon Survey	·	1.2 km	MPC · JPL
473966	2016 EK_{188}	—	December 19, 2004	Mount Lemmon	Mount Lemmon Survey	EOS	1.9 km	MPC · JPL
473967	2016 EA_{190}	—	May 11, 2002	Socorro	LINEAR	·	1 km	MPC · JPL
473968	2016 EK_{190}	—	January 7, 2010	Kitt Peak	Spacewatch	·	2.4 km	MPC · JPL
473969	2016 EM_{191}	—	February 9, 2002	Kitt Peak	Spacewatch	·	2.2 km	MPC · JPL
473970	2016 EN_{191}	—	March 14, 2007	Catalina	CSS	·	3.2 km	MPC · JPL
473971	2016 EW_{191}	—	December 28, 2011	Mount Lemmon	Mount Lemmon Survey	·	1.0 km	MPC · JPL
473972	2016 EP_{192}	—	April 29, 2008	Mount Lemmon	Mount Lemmon Survey	BRG	1.4 km	MPC · JPL
473973	2016 EE_{193}	—	April 18, 2012	Kitt Peak	Spacewatch	EUN	1.0 km	MPC · JPL
473974	2016 EM_{195}	—	February 5, 2011	Catalina	CSS	·	2.1 km	MPC · JPL
473975	2016 EX_{195}	—	May 24, 2010	WISE	WISE	EOS	3.0 km	MPC · JPL
473976	2016 EB_{196}	—	January 17, 2010	Kitt Peak	Spacewatch	VER	2.7 km	MPC · JPL
473977	2016 EG_{196}	—	February 1, 2005	Kitt Peak	Spacewatch	·	2.7 km	MPC · JPL
473978	2016 EK_{196}	—	March 16, 2005	Catalina	CSS	·	3.8 km	MPC · JPL
473979	2016 ER_{196}	—	April 18, 2005	Catalina	CSS	·	4.2 km	MPC · JPL
473980	2016 ES_{196}	—	February 9, 2010	Catalina	CSS	·	4.0 km	MPC · JPL
473981	2016 ET_{196}	—	September 30, 2008	Mount Lemmon	Mount Lemmon Survey	·	4.3 km	MPC · JPL
473982	2016 EH_{197}	—	August 15, 2009	Kitt Peak	Spacewatch	·	2.4 km	MPC · JPL
473983	2016 EA_{198}	—	March 9, 2007	Mount Lemmon	Mount Lemmon Survey	·	1.6 km	MPC · JPL
473984	2016 ER_{198}	—	October 12, 2007	Kitt Peak	Spacewatch	·	660 m	MPC · JPL
473985	2016 EE_{201}	—	October 15, 2007	Mount Lemmon	Mount Lemmon Survey	V	580 m	MPC · JPL
473986	2016 EM_{201}	—	January 21, 2012	Kitt Peak	Spacewatch	·	1.1 km	MPC · JPL
473987	2016 EU_{201}	—	March 19, 2007	Mount Lemmon	Mount Lemmon Survey	·	2.3 km	MPC · JPL
473988	2016 EY_{201}	—	December 27, 2005	Kitt Peak	Spacewatch	·	570 m	MPC · JPL
473989	2016 EC_{202}	—	October 10, 2004	Kitt Peak	Spacewatch	·	1.9 km	MPC · JPL
473990	2016 EM_{202}	—	June 3, 2010	WISE	WISE	·	4.2 km	MPC · JPL
473991	2016 EU_{202}	—	October 25, 2008	Mount Lemmon	Mount Lemmon Survey	HYG	2.5 km	MPC · JPL
473992	2016 FH_{17}	—	March 23, 2006	Kitt Peak	Spacewatch	·	840 m	MPC · JPL
473993	2016 FT_{17}	—	April 24, 2000	Kitt Peak	Spacewatch	·	2.8 km	MPC · JPL
473994	2016 FV_{19}	—	March 8, 2005	Catalina	CSS	·	2.9 km	MPC · JPL
473995	2016 FX_{19}	—	January 11, 2010	Kitt Peak	Spacewatch	LIX	3.1 km	MPC · JPL
473996	2016 FY_{19}	—	December 15, 2004	Kitt Peak	Spacewatch	·	2.9 km	MPC · JPL
473997	2016 FH_{21}	—	March 9, 2005	Socorro	LINEAR	·	1.1 km	MPC · JPL
473998	2016 FM_{23}	—	September 21, 1996	Kitt Peak	Spacewatch	(5)	1.2 km	MPC · JPL
473999	2016 FW_{23}	—	October 1, 2005	Mount Lemmon	Mount Lemmon Survey	·	1.2 km	MPC · JPL
474000	2016 FW_{32}	—	September 23, 2008	Kitt Peak	Spacewatch	EOS	1.4 km	MPC · JPL

back to top

== Meaning of names ==
As minor planet discoveries are confirmed, they are given a permanent number by the IAU's Minor Planet Center (MPC), and the discoverers can then submit names for them, following the IAU's naming conventions. The list below concerns those minor planets in the specified number-range that have received names, and explains the meanings of those names.

Official naming citations of newly named small Solar System bodies are approved and published in a bulletin by IAU's Working Group for Small Bodies Nomenclature (WGSBN). Before May 2021, citations were published in MPC's Minor Planet Circulars for many decades. Recent citations can also be found on the JPL Small-Body Database (SBDB). Until his death in 2016, German astronomer Lutz D. Schmadel compiled these citations into the Dictionary of Minor Planet Names (DMP) and regularly updated the collection.

Based on Paul Herget's The Names of the Minor Planets, Schmadel also researched the unclear origin of numerous asteroids, most of which had been named prior to World War II. This article incorporates text from this source, which is in the public domain: SBDB New namings may only be added to this list below after official publication as the preannouncement of names is condemned. The WGSBN publishes a comprehensive guideline for the naming rules of non-cometary small Solar System bodies.

Named minor planet	Provisional	This minor planet was named for...	Ref · Catalog
473503 Minoruozima	2015 XE_{132}	Minoru Ozima (born 1930) was among the first geochemists to recognize that information contained in noble gas isotopes sheds light on the process of formation and evolution of the planets. He is a leading figure in this field, having greatly contributed to the development of the geochemistry and cosmochemistry of noble gases.	JPL · 473503
