= V. M. Goldschmidt Award =

American science award in geochemistry

- Sponsored by: Geochemical Society
- Reward: Medal
- First award: 1972
- Website: geochemsoc.org/honors/society-awards/vm-goldschmidt-award

The V. M. Goldschmidt Award is an award given by the Geochemical Society at the V. M. Goldschmidt Conference for achievements in the fields of geochemistry and cosmochemistry. The award in honor of Victor Moritz Goldschmidt, a pioneer in both those fields.

== Winners ==
- 1972 Paul W. Gast
- 1973 Robert M. Garrels
- 1974 Hans E. Suess
- 1975 Harold C. Urey
- 1976 Hans P. Eugster
- 1977 Samuel Epstein
- 1978 Gerald J. Wasserburg
- 1979 Harmon Craig
- 1980 Clair C. Patterson
- 1981 Robert N. Clayton
- 1982 Konrad B. Krauskopf
- 1983 Samuel S. Goldich
- 1984 Alfred Nier
- 1985 James B. Thompson Jr.
- 1986 Claude Allègre
- 1987 Wallace S. Broecker
- 1988 Harold C. Helgeson
- 1989 Karl K. Turekian
- 1990 Edward Anders
- 1991 Alfred Edward Ringwood
- 1992 Stanley R. Hart
- 1993 S. Ross Taylor
- 1994 Heinrich D. Holland
- 1995 Robert A. Berner
- 1996 Albrecht W. Hofmann
- 1997 Devendra Lal
- 1998 Werner Stumm
- 1999 James L. Bischoff
- 2000 Geoffrey Eglinton
- 2001 Ikuo Kushiro
- 2002 John M. Hayes
- 2003 Bernard J. Wood
- 2004 James R. O'Neil
- 2005 E. Bruce Watson
- 2006 Susan Solomon
- 2007 Guenter Lugmair
- 2008 Francis Albarède
- 2009 Mark H. Thiemens
- 2010 Minoru Ozima
- 2011 Frank Millero
- 2012 Edward M. Stolper
- 2013 Henry "Harry" Elderfield
- 2014 Timothy Grove
- 2015 Miriam Kastner
- 2016 Alexandra Navrotsky
- 2017 Jill Banfield
- 2018 Michael A. Arthur
- 2019 Donald DePaolo
- 2020 Richard Carlson
- 2021 Bernard Marty
- 2022 Marilyn L. Fogel
- 2023 Roberta Rudnick
- 2024 Donald E. Canfield
- 2025 Chris Hawkesworth
