= Karl Turekian =

American geochemist (1927–2013)

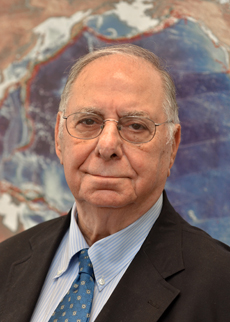

Karl Karekin Turekian (October 25, 1927 – March 15, 2013) was a geochemist and Sterling Professor at Yale University. During his career at Yale, he examined an uncommonly broad range of topics in planetary science — including the sediments of the deep seas, the hot springs of Yellowstone National Park, meteorite strikes, and the composition of Moon rocks.

== Awards and honors ==
- Member of the National Academy of Sciences
- Fellow of the American Academy of Arts and Sciences
- V. M. Goldschmidt Award, The Geochemical Society, 1989
- Maurice Ewing Medal, American Geophysical Union, 1997
