= Minoru Ozima =

Japanese geochemist

- Born: 1930 (age 95–96); Yamagata, Japan
- Education: University of Tokyo, University of Toronto
- Awards: V. M. Goldschmidt Award, Japan Academy Prize
- Scientific career
- Fields: Geochemist
- Workplaces: University of Tokyo

Minoru Ozima (born November 24, 1930, Yamagata, Japan) is a Japanese geochemist and Professor Emeritus of the Department of Earth and Planetary Science, Graduate School of Science, at the University of Tokyo. He was named in the Asian Scientist 100 for the year 2021 by Asian Scientist magazine.

Ozima was one of the first geochemists to recognize that the isotope geochemistry of the noble gases could provide key information about the formation and evolution of planets. A leader in this field, his work on the geochemistry and cosmochemistry of the noble gases has enabled researchers to understand processes of planetary and atmospheric formation of the early Solar System.

== Education ==
Ozima graduated from the Geophysical Institute of the University of Tokyo in 1950. He entered graduate school at the University of Toronto in Canada, where he worked with John Tuzo Wilson and Don Russell. His Ph.D. work involved technical aspects of K-Ar dating. He later returned to the University of Tokyo.

== Research ==
Noble gases are not rare elements in the Sun or the Solar System generally but are extremely depleted on the planet Earth, with lighter elements being the most depleted. In the 1960s, it was generally assumed that the noble gases were unimportant in the formation and evolution of the Earth. In the 1970s, Ozima presented a novel theory, based on measurements of isotopes, that explained the formation of the Earth's atmosphere as the result of a catastrophic degassing event on the Earth within ~100 million years of the Earth’s formation. Through this and subsequent work, Ozima has developed the only model of planetary formation to explain the fractionation patterns of the noble gases. His work in noble gas geochemistry has enabled researchers to understand processes of planetary formation of the early Solar System.

== Awards ==
Minoru Ozima became a Fellow of the Geochemical Society in 2000. He received the V. M. Goldschmidt Award, the highest honor given by the Geochemical Society, in 2010. He is the second Japanese scientist to receive the award, following Ikuo Kushiro in 2001.

In 2020, Ozima received the Japan Academy Prize for his research on noble gas geochemistry and planetary evolution. He was named in the Asian Scientist 100 for the year 2021 by Asian Scientist magazine.

The minor planet or asteroid 473503 Minoruozima was discovered in 2011 by the Catalina Sky Survey at Mount Lemmon Observatory and named in his honor.

== Bibliography ==
=== Papers ===
Among his many publications, a number of papers have been noted as particularly important:

- Ozima, Mituko; Larson, E. E. (10 February 1970). "Low- and high-temperature oxidation of titanomagnetite in relation to irreversible changes in the magnetic properties of submarine basalts". Journal of Geophysical Research. 75 (5): 1003–1017. Bibcode:1970JGR....75.1003O. doi:10.1029/JB075i005p01003.
- Ozima, Minoru (August 1975). "Ar isotopes and Earth-atmosphere evolution models". Geochimica et Cosmochimica Acta. 39 (8): 1127–1134. Bibcode:1975GeCoA..39.1127O. doi:10.1016/0016-7037(75)90054-x.
- Hiyagon, H; Ozima, M (September 1986). "Partition of noble gases between olivine and basalt melt". Geochimica et Cosmochimica Acta. 50 (9): 2045–2057. Bibcode:1986GeCoA..50.2045H. doi:10.1016/0016-7037(86)90258-9.
- Hiyagon, H; Ozima, M; Marty, B; Zashu, S; Sakai, H (March 1992). "Noble gases in submarine glasses from mid-oceanic ridges and Loihi seamount: Constraints on the early history of the Earth". Geochimica et Cosmochimica Acta. 56 (3): 1301–1316. Bibcode:1992GeCoA..56.1301H. doi:10.1016/0016-7037(92)90063-O.
- Ozima, M.; Podosek, F. A. (10 November 1999). "Formation age of Earth from129I/127I and244Pu/238U systematics and the missing Xe". Journal of Geophysical Research: Solid Earth. 104 (B11): 25493–25499. Bibcode:1999JGR...10425493O. doi:10.1029/1999jb900257. ISSN 0148-0227.
- Ozima, Minoru; Yin, Qing-Zhu; Podosek, Frank A.; Miura, Yayoi N. (18 November 2008). "Toward understanding early Earth evolution: Prescription for approach from terrestrial noble gas and light element records in lunar soils". Proceedings of the National Academy of Sciences. 105 (46): 17654–17658. Bibcode:2008PNAS..10517654O. doi:10.1073/pnas.0806596105. ISSN 0027-8424. PMC 2584670. PMID 19001263.

=== Books ===
- Ojima, Minoru (1981). The earth : its birth and growth (1st ed.). London: Cambridge University Press. ISBN 978-0-521-23500-6.
- Ojima, Minoru (2012). The earth : its birth and growth (2nd ed.). Cambridge: Cambridge University Press. ISBN 978-1-107-60076-8.
- Ojima, Minoru; Podosek, Frank A. (1983). Noble gas geochemistry (1st ed.). Cambridge: Cambridge University Press. ISBN 978-0-521-23939-4.
- Ojima, Minoru; Podosek, Frank A. (2002). Noble gas geochemistry (2nd ed.). Cambridge: Cambridge University Press. ISBN 0-521-80366-7.
- Ojima, Minoru (1987). Geohistory : global evolution of the earth. Berlin: Springer-Verlag. ISBN 978-0-387-16595-0.
