= Ikuo Kushiro =

Japanese earth scientist (born 1934)

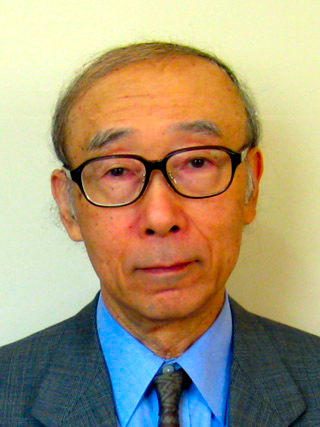
Ikuo Kushiro

Ikuo Kushiro MJA (久城 育夫, Kushiro Ikuo, born March 30, 1934, in Osaka Prefecture) is a Japanese petrologist, known for his research in experimental petrology. His experiments on peridotites contributed significantly to the understanding of the formation of magma under mid-ocean ridges and island arcs.

== Education and career ==
Between 1953 and 1957 Kushiro studied geology at the University of Tokyo. After graduation with a bachelor of science degree, he was a PhD student under Hisashi Kuno and studied the petrology of igneous rocks. After graduating with a doctorate in 1962, he worked for three years at the Carnegie Institution Geophysical Laboratory in Washington, D.C., specializing under the direction of J. Frank Schairer and Hatten Schuyler Yoder on experimental petrology. The central subject of his work was the formation of basaltic magmas with special consideration of the role of water. He and his colleagues identified phlogopite and potassium richterite (in which potassium is substituted for sodium in richterite) as two of the most important minerals involving in recycling water into the Earth's interior. In 1967, after two years at the University of Tokyo, he returned to the Geophysical Laboratory as a postdoc and was employed there from 1971 to 1981 as a scientist. In 1969 he was involved in examining rock samples brought from the Moon by Apollo 11 as part of the Apollo program. In 1974 he became a professor of petrology at the University of Tokyo while remaining an employee of the Carnegie Institution.

From 1990 to 1994, Kushiro was academic dean of the University of Tokyo, after which he was appointed vice president of the university. After retiring from the University of Tokyo, Kushiro became head of Okayama University's Institute for Study of the Earth's Interior (ISEI), where he remained until 1999. Since then he has worked as a director at the Institute for Frontier Research on Earth Evolution (IFREE) near Tokyo.

== Awards and honors ==
Kushiro was elected in 1976 a Fellow of the American Geophysical Union. In 1982, he received the Japan Academy Prize. He was elected in 1983 to the National Academy of Sciences and in 1993 to the Japan Academy. In 1997 he became an honorary member of the Geochemical Society and the European Association of Geochemistry. In 1999 he received the Harry H. Hess Medal from the American Geophysical Union, and in the same year the Roebling Medal of the Mineralogical Society of America and the Arthur Holmes Medal of the European Union of Geosciences. He won the V. M. Goldschmidt Award in 2001. In 2003 the Geological Society of London awarded him the Wollaston Medal. In 2009 he was awarded the Japanese Order of the Sacred Treasure, 2nd Class. The same year, from a meteorite collected in Antarctica, a newly discovered mineral from the pyroxene group was named kushiroite in his honor.

== Selected publications ==
- I. Kushiro (1960) Si-Al relation in clinopyroxenes from igneous rocks Am. J. Sci. 258, 548–54.
- I. Kushiro and H.S. Yoder (1966) Anorthite-forsterite and anorthite-enstatite reactions and their bearing on the basalt-eclogite transformation. J. Petrol. 7, 337–62.
- I. Kushiro (1968) Compositions of magmas formed by partial zone melting in the Earth's upper mantle. J. Geophys. Res. 73, 619–34.
- I. Kushiro, Y. Syono and S. Akimoto (1968) Melting of a peridotite nodule at high pressures and high water pressures. J. Geophys. Res. 73, 6023–29.
- I. Kushiro (1969) The system forsterite-diopside-silica with and without water at high pressures. Am. J. Sci. 267A, 269–94.
- I. Kushiro and H. Haramura (1971) Major element variation and possible source materials of Apollo 12 crystalline rocks. Science 171, 1235–1237.
- I. Kushiro (1972) Effect of water on the composition of magmas at high pressures. J. Petrol. 13, 311–34.
- I. Kushiro (1975) On the nature of silicate melt and its significance in magma genesis. Am. J. Sci. 275, 411–31.
- I. Kushiro (1976) Change in viscosity and structure of melt of NaAlSi_{2}O_{6} composition at high pressures. J. Geophys. Res. 81, 6347–50.
- I. Kushiro (1990) Partial melting of mantle wedge and evolution of island arc crust. J. Geophys. Res. 95, 15929–39.
- I. Kushiro (1996) Partial melting of a fertile mantle peridotite at high pressures. Monogr. Am. Geophys. Union 95, 109–22.
- I. Kushiro (2001) Partial melting experiments on peridotite and origin of mid-ocean ridge basalt. Ann. Rev. Earth. Planet. Sci. 29, 71–107.
