= Harry Hammond Hess =

American geologist (1906–1969)

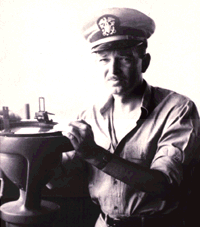
- Hess in 1941
- Born: May 24, 1906; New York City, New York, U.S.
- Died: August 25, 1969 (aged 63); Woods Hole, Massachusetts U.S.
- Education: Princeton University
- Known for: Discovering seafloor spreading
- Awards: Penrose Medal (1966)
- Scientific career
- Fields: Geology
- Thesis: Hydrothermal metamorphism of an ultrabasic intrusive at Schuyler, Virginia (1932)
- Doctoral advisor: Arthur Francis Buddington
- Doctoral students: Eugene Merle Shoemaker; John Tuzo Wilson; Ronald Oxburgh

Harry Hammond Hess (May 24, 1906 – August 25, 1969) was an American geologist and a United States Navy officer in World War II who is considered one of the "founding fathers" of the unifying theory of plate tectonics. He published theories on sea floor spreading, specifically on relationships between island arcs, seafloor gravity anomalies, and serpentinized peridotite, suggesting that the convection in the Earth's mantle is the driving force behind this process.

== Early life and education ==
Harry Hammond Hess was born on May 24, 1906, in New York City to Julian S. Hess, a member of the New York Stock Exchange, and Elizabeth Engel Hess. He attended Asbury Park High School in Asbury Park, New Jersey. In 1923, he entered Yale University, where he intended to study electrical engineering but ended up graduating with a Bachelor of Science degree in geology. Hess failed his first time taking mineralogy at Yale and was told he had no future in the field. Despite this, he continued with his degree and was teaching geology at Princeton when World War II was declared. He spent two years as an exploration geologist in Northern Rhodesia. In 1934 he married Annette Burns.

== Teaching career ==
Harry Hess taught for one year (1932–1933) at Rutgers University in New Jersey and spent a year as a research associate at the Geophysical Laboratory of Washington, D. C., before joining the faculty of Princeton University in 1934. Hess remained at Princeton for the rest of his career and served as Geology Department Chairman from 1950 to 1966. He was a visiting professor at the University of Cape Town, South Africa (1949–1950), and the University of Cambridge, England (1965).

== The Navy-Princeton gravity expedition to the West Indies in 1932 ==
Hess accompanied Dr. Felix Vening Meinesz of Utrecht University on board the US Navy submarine USS S-48 to assist with the second U.S. expedition to obtain gravity measurements at sea. The expedition used a gravimeter, or gravity meter, designed by Meinesz. The submarine traveled a route from Guantanamo, Cuba, to Key West, Florida, and return to Guantanamo through the Bahamas and Turks and Caicos region from 5 February through 25 March 1932. The description of operations and results of the expedition were published by the U.S. Navy Hydrographic Office in The Navy-Princeton gravity expedition to the West Indies in 1932.

== Military and war career ==
Hess joined the United States Navy during World War II, becoming captain of the USS Cape Johnson, an attack transport ship equipped with a new technology: sonar. This command would later prove to be key in Hess's development of his theory of sea floor spreading. Hess carefully tracked his travel routes to Pacific Ocean landings on the Marianas, Philippines, and Iwo Jima, continuously using his ship's echo sounder. This unplanned wartime scientific surveying enabled Hess to collect ocean floor profiles across the North Pacific Ocean, resulting in the discovery of flat-topped submarine volcanoes, which he termed guyots, after the 19th-century geographer Arnold Henry Guyot. After the war, he remained in the Naval Reserve, rising to the rank of rear admiral.

== Scientific discoveries ==
In 1960, Hess made his single most important contribution, which is regarded as part of the major advance in geologic science of the 20th century. In a widely circulated report to the Office of Naval Research, he advanced the theory, now generally accepted, that the Earth's crust moved laterally away from long, volcanically active oceanic ridges. He only understood his ocean floor profiles across the North Pacific Ocean after Marie Tharp and Bruce Heezen (1953, Lamont Group) discovered the Great Global Rift, running along the Mid-Atlantic Ridge. Seafloor spreading, as the process was later named, helped establish Alfred Wegener's earlier (but generally dismissed at the time) concept of continental drift as scientifically respectable. This triggered a revolution in the earth sciences. Hess's report was formally published in his History of Ocean Basins (1962), which for a time was the single most referenced work in solid-earth geophysics. Hess was also involved in many other scientific endeavours, including the Mohole project (1957–1966), an investigation onto the feasibility and techniques of deep sea drilling.

== Accolades and affiliations ==
Hess was elected to the United States National Academy of Sciences in 1952 and the American Philosophical Society in 1960. He was president of The Geological Society of America in 1963 and received their Penrose Medal in 1966. In 1968, he was elected to the American Academy of Arts and Sciences.

== Death ==
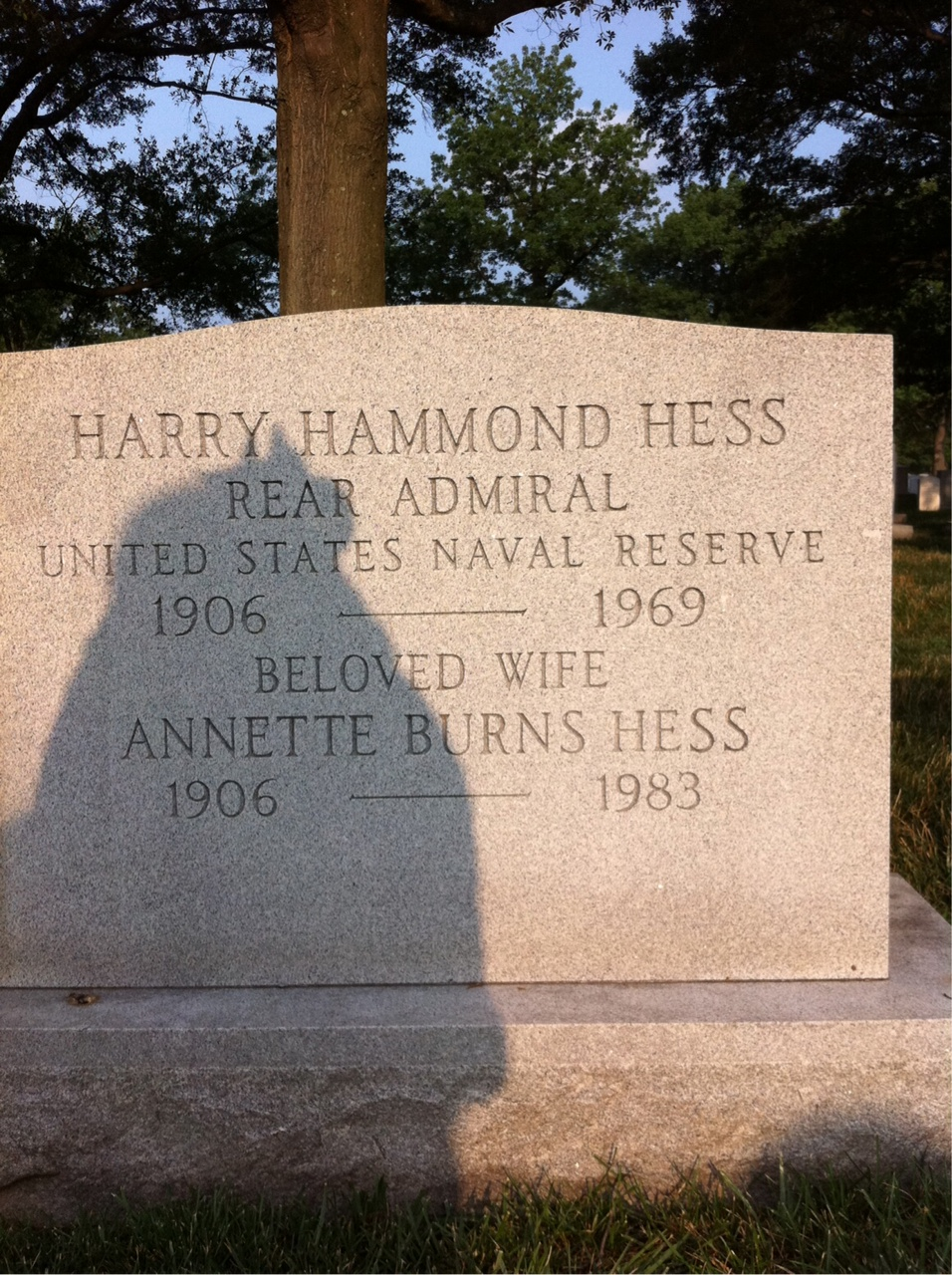
Grave at Arlington National Cemetery

Hess died from a heart attack in Woods Hole, Massachusetts, on August 25, 1969, while chairing a meeting of the Space Science Board of the National Academy of Sciences. He was buried at Arlington National Cemetery and was posthumously awarded the National Aeronautics and Space Administration's Distinguished Public Service Award.

== The Harry H. Hess Medal ==
The American Geophysical Union established the Harry H. Hess medal in his memory in 1984 to "honor outstanding achievements in research of the constitution and evolution of Earth and sister planets."

=== Past recipients ===
- 1985 Gerald J. Wasserburg
- 1987 Julian R. Goldsmith
- 1989 A.G.W. Cameron
- 1991 George W. Wetherill
- 1993 Alfred E. Ringwood
- 1995 Edward Anders
- 1996 Thomas J. Ahrens
- 1997 Stanley Robert Hart
- 1998 David J. Stevenson
- 1999 Ikuo Kushiro
- 2001 Albrecht Hofmann
- 2002 Gerald Schubert
- 2003 David L. Kohlstedt
- 2004 Adolphe Nicolas
- 2005 Sean C. Solomon
- 2006 Alexandra Navrotsky
- 2007 Michael John O'Hara
- 2008 H. Jay Melosh
- 2009 Frank M. Richter
- 2010 David Walker
- 2011 Henry Dick
- 2012 Maria T. Zuber
- 2013 Bernard Wood
- 2014 Donald J. DePaolo
- 2015 Claude Jaupart
- 2016 Alexander Halliday
- 2017 Roberta Rudnick
- 2018 Timothy L. Grove
- 2019 Richard J. Walker
- 2020 Donald B. Dingwell
- 2021 Peter B. Kelemen
- 2022 Janne Blichert-Toft
- 2023 Catherine A. McCammon

== Selected publications ==
- Hess, H. H. (1946). "Drowned ancient islands of the Pacific basin". Am. J. Sci. 244 (11): 772–91. Bibcode:1946AmJS..244..772H. doi:10.2475/ajs.244.11.772.
  - Also in:
    - —— (1947). "Drowned ancient islands of the Pacific basin". International Hydrographic Review. 24: 81–91.
    - —— (1948). "Drowned ancient islands of the Pacific basin". Smithsonian Institution, Annual Report for 1947: 281–300.
- ——; Maxwell, J. C. (1953). "Major structural features of the south-west Pacific: a preliminary interpretation of H. O. 5484, bathymetric chart, New Guinea to New Zealand.". Proceedings of the 7th Pacific Science Congress: Held at Auckland and Christchurch, New Zealand, 1949. Vol. 2. Wellington: Harry H. Tombs, Ltd. pp. 14–17.
- —— (1954). "Geological hypotheses and the Earth's crust under the oceans". A Discussion on the Floor of the Atlantic Ocean. Proceedings of the Royal Society of London, Series A. Vol. 222. The Royal Society. pp. 341–48. JSTOR 99224.
- —— (1955). "The oceanic crust". Journal of Marine Research. 14: 423–39.
- —— (1955). "Serpentines, orogeny and epeirogeny". In A. W. Poldervaart (ed.). Crust of the Earth. Geological Society of America, Special Paper No. 62 (Symposium). New York: The Society. pp. 391–407. doi:10.1130/SPE62-p391.
- —— (1959). "The AMSOC hole to the Earth's mantle". Transactions of the American Geophysical Union. 40 (4): 340–345. Bibcode:1959TrAGU..40..340H. doi:10.1029/tr040i004p00340.
  - Also in:
    - Hess, H. H. (1960). "The AMSOC hole to the Earth's mantle". American Scientist. 47 (2): 254–263. JSTOR 27827541.
- —— (1960). "Nature of great oceanic ridges". Preprints of the 1st International Oceanographic Congress (New York, August 31-September 12, 1959). Washington: American Association for the Advancement of Science. (A). pp. 33–34.
- —— (1960). Evolution of ocean basins (Report). Report to Office of Naval Research. Contract No. 1858(10), NR 081-067. p. 38.
