= Jérôme Chappellaz =

French geochemist and paleoclimatologist (born 1964)

- Born: 22 December 1964 (age 61); Lyon, France
- Education: Joseph Fourier University
- Known for: research on greenhouse gases
- Awards: 2013 Science Innovation Award; 2014 Niels Bohr Medal of Honor 2022 French Ministry of Overseas Medal of Honor for overseas commitment 2023 Belgian Royal Academy of Sciences, Letters and Fine Arts Belgica Medal
- Scientific career
- Fields: glaciology, geochemistry, paleoclimatology
- Workplaces: CNRS (France's National Center for Scientific Research)
- Website: Official website

Jérôme Chappellaz (born 22 December 1964) is a French glaciologist, geochemist and paleoclimatologist who is director of the French Polar Institute. A senior researcher at France's National Center for Scientific Research (CNRS), he is a co-founder and chairman of the Ice Memory Foundation.

== Youth and education ==
Coming from a family of Savoyard craftsmen, Jérôme Chappellaz became interested in volcanology from a very young age, after reading the works of Haroun Tazieff. At university, he studied geology, geophysics and geochemistry.

Chappellaz earned his Diploma of Advanced Studies (DEA) and wrote his doctoral thesis at Joseph Fourier University in Grenoble, within the Laboratory of Glaciology and Environmental Geophysics, which was directed by the glaciologist Claude Lorius. At the time Chappellaz started his doctorate work, in 1987, Lorius was carrying out early analyses of carbon dioxide trapped in Antarctic ice.

As suggested by his thesis advisor Dominique Raynaud, Chappellaz began work on methane (CH_{4}), which is also a greenhouse gas. Eventually, he developed an experimental technique for analyzing the methane in air bubbles naturally trapped in polar ice. He thus obtained the first recording of greenhouse gases covering a complete glacial-interglacial cycle, i.e. 160,000 years, for his 1990 thesis "Étude du méthane atmosphérique au cours du dernier cycle climatique à partir de l'analyse de l'air piégé dans la glace antarctique" (Atmospheric methane over the last climatic cycle from the analysis of the air trapped in Antarctic ice). CNRS recruited him as a research fellow in 1990, at the age of 25 years.

== Scientific contributions ==
Jérôme Chappellaz began his career at the CNRS with a year at the Goddard Institute for Space Studies (NASA) in New York, headed by Professor James Hansen. There he carried out the very first work of modeling the global biogeochemical cycle of atmospheric methane in the glacial and interglacial period, revealing the major role played by variations in the extent of wetland, in particular in tropical regions, in the natural evolution of this greenhouse gas.

In 1995, with his Swiss colleague Thomas Blunier, he initiated the use of rapid variations of methane in natural ice to establish a common chronology of ice cores drilled in Greenland and Antarctica, demonstrating thanks to these new chronologies that when the Greenlandic climate warms sharply during a glaciation, the Antarctic continent cools, due to heat exchanges generated by ocean circulation.

He acted as scientific advisor for director Luc Jacquet's feature film Ice and the Sky (La glace et le ciel), which was shown as the closing film of the 2015 Cannes Film Festival.

In 2018, he became director of the French Polar Institute (Institut polaire français Paul-Émile Victor, IPEV). The IPEV oversees French science in the Arctic, Antarctic, and Sub-Antarctic Islands; the director's role is to ensure logistical support in all these regions.

== Ice Memory project ==
In 2015, Chappellaz co-founded (together with Patrick Ginot) the international heritage project Ice Memory so that future researchers can study ice cores from disappearing glaciers. According to Wired UK, "the Ice Memory project plans to create a library of hundreds of cores in an ice cave at Antarctica's Concordia Research Station, where mean annual temperatures hover around -54°C." Chappellaz continued in a leadership role through at least 2020; National Geographic in 2017 described him as the project's "coordinator". He is also president of the board of directors of the Ice Memory Foundation.

The first samples to be preserved were three cores from a glacier in the French Alps, near the Mont Blanc summit. Chappellaz told reporters that, due to rising temperatures, Alpine glacier cores must be preserved before melting surface water contaminates lower ice layers.

Building the Antarctic vault has been delayed by the COVID pandemic, but Chappellaz expressed confidence that the project, which is endorsed by UNESCO, will proceed. As of 2021, Ice Memory was storing glacier samples from Europe, Bolivia, and Russia in Europe, while waiting for Antarctic storage to become available.

Chappellaz says that teams will collect ice from other sites, including Mount Kilimanjaro in Tanzania and Mera Peak in Nepal.

== Awards ==
- 1993 CNRS Bronze Medal
- 2001 Prix Jaffé of the French Academy of Sciences (Académie des sciences (France))
- 2010 Paul W. Gast lecturer (on "Greenhouse gases and their isotopes in firn air and ice cores"), awarded by the European Association of Geochemistry and the Geochemical Society
- 2013 Science Innovation Award and the Nicholas Shackleton Medal, from the European Association of Geochemistry
- 2014 Niels Bohr Medal of Honor from the University of Copenhagen
- 2015 CNRS Silver Medal
- 2020 Chevalier in French Legion of Honour
- 2022 French Ministry of Overseas Medal of Honor for overseas commitment
- 2023 Belgian Royal Academy of Sciences, Letters and Fine Arts Belgica Medal
