= Andrew and Christine Putnis =

Mineralogists

Andrew Putnis
- Education: University of Newcastle (Australia); Birkbeck College; University of Cambridge (PhD)
- Occupation: Professor of Mineralogy
- Employer(s): University of Münster; Curtin University
- Known for: Mineralogy
- Spouse: Christine Putnis
- Awards: Bunsen Medal (2018); Roebling Medal (2020)
- Scientific career
- Thesis: Transformation Behaviour in Sulphide Minerals (1976)

Christine Putnis
- Education: University of Newcastle (Australia); University of Münster (PhD)
- Occupation: Research scientist
- Employer(s): University of Münster; Curtin University
- Known for: Geochemistry and mineralogy
- Spouse: Andrew Putnis
- Awards: Werner Stumm Medal (2025)
- Scientific career
- Thesis: Reactions at the fluid-mineral interface (2006)

Andrew Putnis and Christine V. Putnis are Australian mineralogists. In 2013, the new mineral Putnisite was named in their honour, in recognition of their contributions to mineralogy.

== Early life and family ==
Andrew and Christine Putnis (née Nunn) grew up in Australia, and met at the University of Newcastle in New South Wales, where Andrew was studying physics and mathematics, and Christine was studying geology. They both trained as teachers, moved to the United Kingdom in the early 1970s, to Germany in 1995, and back to Australia in 2015. They have six children.

== Andrew Putnis ==
Andrew Putnis completed a bachelors degree in physics at the University of Newcastle (Australia), followed by a diploma in education at Newcastle, and a bachelors degree in geology at Birkbeck College, London. He then embarked on a PhD on the structure of sulphide minerals at the University of Cambridge, under the supervision of Desmond McConnell. He completed his PhD in 1976, and then remained in Cambridge as a researcher until 1981, and then lecturer. In 1995, he moved to the University of Munster, Germany.

In 2015, Putnis was appointed as director of the Institute for Geoscience Research (TIGeR) at Curtin University, Perth, Western Australia, and in 2017, he was awarded the title of John Curtin Distinguished Professor.

Over the course of his career, Andrew Putnis has written many influential papers, but his most cited work is a textbook that he wrote in 1992, called Introduction to Mineral Sciences. In a medal citation for Andrew, geochemist Michael Hochella noted that this book was 'well ahead of its time', and covered many highly quantitative topics with 'great sophistication'.

Andrew Putnis was awarded the Bunsen medal of the European Geosciences Union in 2018, and the Roebling Medal of the Mineralogical Society of America in 2020.

== Christine Putnis ==
Christine Putnis completed a bachelors degree at the University of Newcastle (Australia), followed by a diploma in education. When they moved to Cambridge in the 1970s, Christine Putnis taught science in local schools, before working as a research assistant in the Department of Earth Sciences, University of Cambridge. In 1995 she moved to the University of Munster, Germany, where she completed a doctoral degree, and conducted research in mineralogy, in particular on the processes occurring during the dissolution and precipitation of mineral phases in the presence of fluids.

In 2019, she edited a special issue of the journal Minerals on the topic of mineral surface reactions at the nanoscale. In 2025, she was awarded the Science Innovation Award Werner Stumm Medal by the European Association of Geochemistry for her work using atomic force microscopy to investigate mineral reactions and crystal growth.

== Joint work and recognition ==
Andrew and Christine Putnis have published numerous scientific papers across areas of mineralogy and geochemistry; including several two-author papers with each other.

In 2013, their contributions to the field of mineralogy were recognised with the naming of a newly-discovered strontium-calcium-chromium sulphate mineral 'putnisite', in their honour. Putnisite was first discovered on the Polar Bear Peninsula in the Shire of Dundas, Western Australia and only been reported from a small number of locations in Australia, where it has been found as small, purple cube-shaped crystals.
