= Gideon Henderson =

British geologist

Gideon Henderson CBE FRS
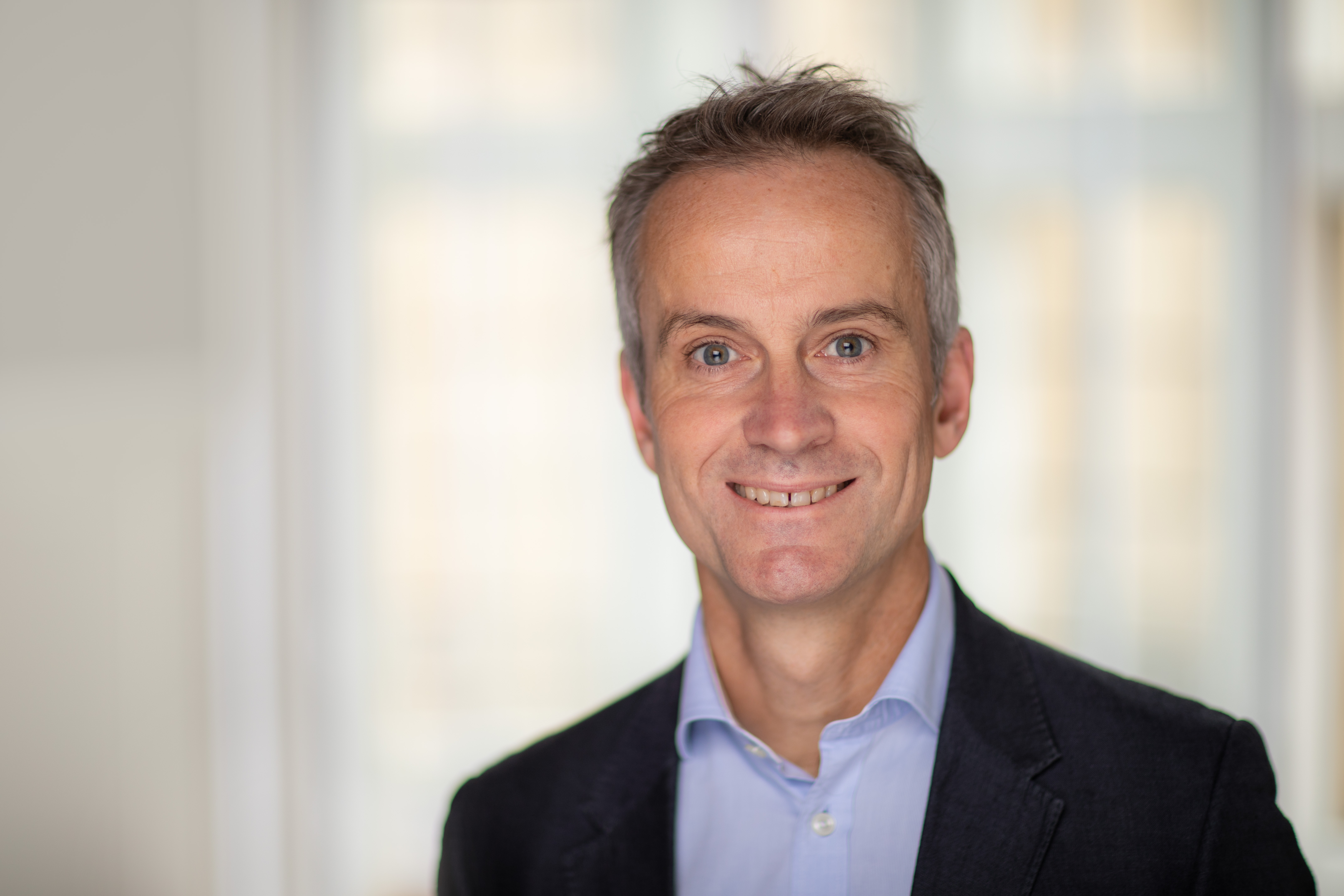
- Education: Hertford College, Oxford; St. John's College, Cambridge
- Awards: Fellow of the Royal Society (2013)
- Scientific career
- Workplaces: Department for Environment, Food, and Rural Affairs (Defra), University of Oxford; University of Cambridge; Columbia University
- Thesis: The uranium and strontium isotope evolution of seawater over the past four hundred thousand years (1995)
- Academic advisors: Keith O'Nions
- Website: www.earth.ox.ac.uk/people/gideon-henderson/ royalsociety.org/people/gideon-henderson-11608/

Gideon Mark Henderson CBE FRS is an environmental scientist and science advisor. His research focuses on low-temperature geochemistry, the carbon cycle, the oceans, and climate change. He is a Professor at the University of Oxford and, from 2019 to 2025 served as the Chief Scientific Adviser and Director General for Science and Analysis at the UK Government's Department for Environment, Food, and Rural Affairs (Defra).

== Education ==
Henderson went to his local comprehensive school Altwood Church of England School in Maidenhead, graduated in earth sciences from Hertford College, Oxford, and gaining a PhD at St John's College, Cambridge supervised by Professor Sir Keith O'Nions (1990–1994).

== Career ==
After a brief stint at the journal Nature, Henderson was a postdoctoral fellow (1994-1996) and then associate research scientist (1996-1998) at the Lamont–Doherty Earth Observatory of Columbia University, where he worked with Wally Broecker and Bob Anderson. In 1999 he was appointed lecturer at the Department of Earth Sciences of the University of Oxford, where he made professor (2006) and head of department (2013 to 2017). He is also a senior research fellow at University College, Oxford. From 2019-2025 he took leave from the University to work as Chief Scientific Adviser at Defra, where he was Director General for Science and Analysis. In that position he was responsible for R&D and ministerial advice across a broad range of environmental and agricultural science Defra.

== Other present positions ==
- Chair of the UK Met Office Science Advisory Committee
- Senior Independent Member for Council of The Natural Environment Research Council (NERC)
- Member of the Advisory Board for the UN Decade of Ocean Science

== Research ==
Henderson's research seeks to understand processes in the surface-Earth system. His work has made extensive use of the isotopes created by decay of natural uranium (the U-series decay chain) to assess the rates and timing of environmental processes. He has also been a pioneer in the use of novel isotope systems, particularly lithium, calcium, cadmium, and barium isotopes to trace environmental processes.

Past Climate: Henderson's work uses the record of past climate captured by the chemistry of sediments and stalagmites to understand processes in the climate system that are hard to understand from present climate alone. Particular advances have been his use of precise marine chronology to help understand the mechanisms of ice-age deglaciation and sea-level change; the chemistry of stalagmites to quantify the response of Asian monsoon rainfall to climate change; and the growth of stalagmites to understand the sensitivity of Siberian permafrost to warming and the presence of sea-ice.

Marine: With Bob Anderson, Henderson chaired the planning group (2004–2006) and subsequent scientific steering committee (2007- 2012) that initiated the marine chemistry programme, GEOTRACES and lead its growth to a successful global programme. He led the group that wrote the 2017 Royal Society report, Future Ocean Resources. His own oceanic research includes the use of U-series isotopes to assess the rates of marine processes such as circulation and sea-level rise.

CO2 Removal: Henderson was a founding director (2010–2013) of the Oxford Geoengineering programme, and a member of the steering committee for the NERC Public Dialogue on Geoengineering. In 2017 he chaired the group that wrote the Royal Society and Royal Academy of Engineering report, Greenhouse Gas Removal. His own research includes assessment of enhanced rock weathering and ocean alkalinity enhancement.

== Awards ==
Henderson was elected a Fellow of the Royal Society (FRS) in 2013 ". He is also a Fellow of the Royal Society of Chemistry as Leader in the Field (2023), a Fellow of the European Association of Geochemistry (2022) and an Honorary Fellow of St. John’s College, Cambridge (2025). Previous awards include The Wollaston Fund of the Geological Society of London (2006), and the Plymouth Marine Science Medal (2016).
