= Sachiko Amari =

Japanese astrophysicist

Sachiko Amari is a Japanese astrophysicist who focuses upon presolar grains. She developed the method for isolating presolar grains in primitive meteorites and also researched noble gases in meteorites. Amari was awarded the Urey Medal by the European Association of Geochemistry in 2021. She currently is a Research Professor of Physics at Washington University in St. Louis.

== Early life and education ==
Sachiko Amari received her PhD in 1986, at Kobe University, where she studied extra-terrestrial material within deep-sea sediments.

== Career and research ==
Sachiko Amari worked as a research assistant with the University of Chicago's Chemistry Department starting in 1988. She then began working at Washington University in St. Louis in 1990 where she currently still works as a Research Professor of Physics. Amari is also a visiting scientist at the Geochemical Research Center at the University of Tokyo, Japan.

Sachiko Amari also has been a fellow of the Meteoritical Society since 2000 and is a fellow of the Japan Geoscience Union as of 2022.

== Awards and honors ==
- 2000 - Meteoritical Society Fellowship
- 2021 - H.C. Urey Award
- 2022 - Japan Geoscience Union Fellowship

== Publications ==
- Matsuda J., Tsukamoto H., Miyakawa C. and Amari S. (2010). Noble gas study of the Saratov L4 chondrite. Meteorit. Planet. Sci. 45, pp. 361-372.
- Amari S. (2009). Presolar diamond in meteorites. Publ. Astron. Soc. Australia 26, pp. 266-270.
- Sachiko Amari, Shiho Zaizen, Jun-Ichi Matsuda, An attempt to separate Q from the Allende meteorite by physical methods, Geochimica et Cosmochimica Acta, Volume 67, Issue 24, 2003, Pages 4665-4677, ISSN 0016-7037, https://doi.org/10.1016/j.gca.2003.08.009.
