= Urey Medal =

European science award

The Urey Medal is given annually by the European Association of Geochemistry for outstanding contributions advancing Geochemistry over a career. The award is named after the physical chemist Harold Urey, FRS.

== Urey Medalists ==
Year	Name	Institution
1990	Wallace S. Broecker and Hans Oeschger	Columbia University, USA, and University of Bern, Switzerland
1995	Samuel Epstein, Robert N. Clayton, and Hugh P. Taylor, Jr.	California Institute of Technology (Epstein and Taylor) and University of Chicago (Clayton), USA
1997	Geoffrey Eglinton and John Hayes	University of Bristol, UK and Woods Hole Oceanographic Institution, USA
1998	Jean-Guy Schilling	University of Rhode Island, USA
1999	John M. Edmond	Massachusetts Institute of Technology, USA
2000	Donald J. DePaolo	University of California, Berkeley, USA
2001	Keith O'Nions	University of Oxford, UK
2002	Grenville Turner	University of Manchester, UK
2003	Nicholas Shackleton	University of Cambridge, UK
2004	Harold C. Helgeson	University of California, Berkeley, USA
2005	Alexandra Navrotsky	University of California, Davis, USA
2006	Herbert Palme	University of Cologne, Germany
2007	Harry Elderfield	Cambridge University, UK
2008	Pascal Richet	IPGP, France
2009	François Morel	Princeton University, USA
2010	Charles Langmuir	Harvard University, USA
2011	Donald E. Canfield	University of Southern Denmark, Denmark
2012	Alexander Halliday	University of Oxford, UK
2013	Igor Tolstikhin	Russian Academy of Sciences
2014	Edward Boyle	Massachusetts Institute of Technology, USA
2015	Albrecht W. Hofmann	Max Planck Institute for Chemistry, Germany
2016	Klaus Mezger	University of Bern, Switzerland
2017	Eiji Ohtani	Tohoku University, Japan
2018	Susan L. Brantley	Pennsylvania State University, USA
2019	Eric Oelkers	GET Laboratory, CNRS, France
2020	Jillian Banfield	University of California, Berkeley, USA
2021	Sachiko Amari	Washington University in St. Louis, USA
2022	William White	Cornell University, USA
2023	Bo Barker Jørgensen	Aarhus University, Denmark
2024	Janne Blichert-Toft	Ecole Normale Supérieure de Lyon and French National Centre for Scientific Research, France
2025	Donald Sparks	University of Delaware, USA

== See also ==
- List of geology awards
