= Carol D. Frost =

American geologist and professor

- Born: May 23, 1957 (age 69)
- Education: University of Cambridge; Dartmouth College
- Scientific career
- Workplaces: University of Wyoming
- Doctoral advisor: Sir R. Keith O’Nions

Carol Denison Frost (born May 23, 1957) is an American isotope geologist, petrologist and professor. Her primary research focuses on the evolution of the continental crust and granite petrogenesis. She has spent over forty years investigating the geologic history of the Wyoming Province and the formation and geochemical classification of granite. Other contributions include isotopic fingerprinting of natural waters, including water associated with energy production. She served as Director of the Earth Sciences Division, National Science Foundation, from December 2014 to January 2018. Frost joined the British Geological Survey Board of Directors in 2023. She is a Fellow of the Geological Society of America, the Mineralogical Society of America, and a Geochemistry Fellow of the Geochemical Society and European Association of Geochemistry.

== Early life ==
Frost grew up in Anchorage, Alaska. Prior to the 1964 Alaska earthquake her family home was four blocks from Cook Inlet; afterwards it was only two. This experience of the dynamic Earth led her to study geology at Dartmouth College, where she completed an undergraduate honors thesis in the Salt Range of northern Pakistan. She earned the PhD at the University of Cambridge in 1984. Frost worked with Keith O'Nions on her doctoral research in Cambridge. She used isotopic tracers to investigate sediment provenance and granite petrogenesis, and her publisshed work underscored the important role of crustal recycling in the geochemical evolution of the continental crust. In 1991, she became a Life Fellow of Clare Hall, Cambridge.

== Career ==
Frost joined the University of Wyoming as an assistant professor in 1983, rising through the ranks and becoming professor in 1995. Frost held a number of administrative positions, first at the University of Wyoming and then at the National Science Foundation. From 2006 to 2007, she was founding director of the School of Energy Resources at UW. She then served as Associate Vice President for Research (2008-2010), Vice President for Special Projects (2010-2012), and Associate Provost (2012-2013). In 2014 she became Division Director for the Division of Earth Sciences at the National Science Foundation, a position she held until returning to the University of Wyoming in early 2018. Frost became Professor Emerita in 2020.

Frost served as the 101st President of the Mineralogical Society of America (2020). She previously served as Vice President (2018–2019) and Councilor (2007–2010). She also served as a Councilor for the Geological Society of America (2022–2026) and has chaired publications committees for both the American Geophysical Union and the Mineralogical Society of America.

She served as President of the Wyoming State Geological Survey Advisory Board, President of Phi Beta Kappa Alpha of Wyoming, and as a gubernatorial appointee to the Board of Professional Geologists for the State of Wyoming. She co-chaired the 2025 National Academies consensus study group, which issued the report Meeting US Mineral Resource Needs.

Frost served as science editor of Geosphere from 2009 to 2013 and as co-chair of UNESCO's IGCP-510 project on A-type granites and related rocks from 2005 to 2010. She became principal editor of Elements magazine for 2025–2027. In 2025, she co-chaired a National Academies study that produced the report Meeting Future U.S. Mineral Resource Needs: The Role of the U.S. Geological Survey.

== Research ==
Frost's research involves studying how the continental crust has changed throughout Earth's history. She works with a multitude of rocks, including igneous, metamorphic, and sedimentary (from the Archaean period to today) as well as natural waters and materials such as coal and crude oils. She focuses especially on the Archean continental crust in Wyoming, where she is looking at what she describes to be “the oldest high-pressure metamorphism in North America” (Frost, n.d., Research Statement, para. 2) in order to take note of a historical collision between continents. Most of her research is on the topic of Precambrian evolution of the continental crust and granite petrogenesis. Her work on granite associated with anorthosite helped to settle a long-lived controversy over whether they are of crustal or mantle origin. Frost’s work in Wyoming contributed to understanding of the evolution of the Earth’s early crust and the initiation of modern plate tectonics. Her collaborative work in the Granite Mountains established the presence of 3.8 billion-year-old crust, and in the Teton Range has documented Neoarchean granulite-facies metamorphism, providing evidence for Himalayan-style continental collision at approximately 2.68–2.67 billion years ago.

Frost's research in Wyoming has found that various groundwater aquifers are made up of unique Sr isotopic compositions, and therefore, by using Sr isotopic ratios, contamination between aquifers can be identified. In the Powder River Basin of Wyoming, she and her partners have also determined that unique Sr and C isotopic compositions can be found in groundwaters from aquifers made up of sandstone and coal, which can help them to trace and take note of changes in the movement of groundwater caused by dewatering (which is a result of the methane produced from coal beds and surface mining).

She has also acted as a private investigator on projects that stem from research regarding sites of geologic formations for carbon dioxide storage as well as depleted gas fields in southeastern and northeastern Wyoming, respectively. These projects provide the instruction needed for the “injection and storage of carbon dioxide in deep saline aquifer and depleted oil and gas fields” (Frost, n.d., Research Statement, para. 5).

== Awards and honors ==
- 2025–2027, Principal Editor, Elements magazine
- 2024–2025, Co-chair, National Academies consensus study on optimizing the USGS Mineral Resources Program
- 2019 Fellow, Geological Society of America
- 2016 Geochemistry Fellow, Geochemical Society and European Association of Geochemistry
- 2013 National Ski Patrol Purple Merit Star
- 2008 George Duke Humphrey Award, University of Wyoming
- 2007 Chosen “Top Ten Teacher” by UW College of Arts & Sciences students
- 2001 Carnegie Foundation/CASE Wyoming Professor of the Year
- 2000-2001 Ellbogen Meritorious Classroom Teaching Award, University of Wyoming
- Fall 2000 Presidential Award, University of Wyoming
- 1998 Fellow, Mineralogical Society of America
- 1990-1991 – Visiting Fellow, Clare Hall, Cambridge
- Licensed Professional Geologist, State of Wyoming (PG-2591)

== Selected publications ==
- Frost, C. D.; Swapp, S. M.; Hoch, A. R.; Runyon, S. E. (2025). "Petrogenesis of the Rattlesnake Hills alkaline magmatic complex, Wyoming, USA: potential for rare-earth-element enrichment". Journal of Petrology. 66 (11): egaf091. doi:10.1093/petrology/egaf091.
- Frost, C. D.; Mueller, P. A. (2024). "Archean cratons: time capsules of the early Earth". Elements. 20 (3): 162–167. doi:10.2138/gselements.20.3.162.
- Frost, C. D.; Frost, B. R. (2019). Essentials of Igneous and Metamorphic Petrology (2nd ed.). Cambridge University Press. ISBN 978-1108710589.
- Frost, C. D.; McLaughlin, J. F.; Frost, B. R.; Fanning, C. M.; Swapp, S. M.; Kruckenberg, S. C.; Gonzalez, J. (2017). "Hadean origins of Paleoarchean continental crust in the central Wyoming Province". Geological Society of America Bulletin. 129 (3–4): 259–280. doi:10.1130/B31555.1.
- Frost, C. D.; Frost, B. R.; Beard, J. S. (2016). "On silica-rich granitoids and their eruptive equivalents". American Mineralogist. 101: 1268–1284. doi:10.2138/am-2015-5307.
- Frost, C. D.; Frost, B. R. (2013). "Proterozoic ferroan feldspathic magmatism". Precambrian Research. 228: 151–163. doi:10.1016/j.precamres.2013.01.016.
- Frost, C. D.; Frost, B. R. (2011). "On ferroan (A-type) granites: their compositional variability and modes of origin". Journal of Petrology. 52: 39–53. doi:10.1093/petrology/egq070.
- Frost, B. R.; Frost, C. D. (2008). "A geochemical classification for feldspathic igneous rocks". Journal of Petrology. 49 (11): 1955–1969. doi:10.1093/petrology/egn054.
- Sharma, S.; Frost, C. D. (2008). "Tracing coal bed natural gas co-produced water using stable isotopes of carbon". Ground Water. 46: 329–334. doi:10.1111/j.1745-6584.2007.00417.x.
- Frost, C. D.; Toner, R. N. (2004). "Strontium isotopic identification of water-rock interaction and groundwater mixing". Ground Water. 42: 418–432. doi:10.1111/j.1745-6584.2004.tb02689.x.
- Frost, C. D.; Pearson, B. N.; Ogle, K. M.; Heffern, E. L.; Lyman, R. M. (2002). "Sr isotopic tracing of aquifer interactions in an area of coal and methane production, Powder River Basin, Wyoming". Geology. 30: 923–926. doi:10.1130/0091-7613(2002)030<0923:SITOAI>2.0.CO;2.
- Frost, C. D.; Frost, B. R.; Bell, J. M.; Chamberlain, K. R. (2002). "The relationship between A-type granites and residual magmas from anorthosite: evidence from the northern Sherman batholith, Laramie Mountains, Wyoming, USA". Precambrian Research. 119: 45–71. doi:10.1016/S0301-9268(02)00117-1.
- Frost, C. D.; Frost, B. R.; Chamberlain, K. R.; Edwards, B. R. (1999). "Petrogenesis of the 1.43 Ga Sherman batholith, SE Wyoming: a reduced, rapakivi-type anorogenic granite". Journal of Petrology. 40: 1771–1802. doi:10.1093/petroj/40.12.1771.
- Frost, C. D. (1993). "Nd isotopic evidence for the antiquity of the Wyoming Province". Geology. 21: 351–354. doi:10.1130/0091-7613(1993)021<0351:NIEFTA>2.3.CO;2.
- Frost, C. D.; O'Nions, R. K. (1985). "Caledonian magma genesis and crustal recycling". Journal of Petrology. 26: 515–544. doi:10.1093/petrology/26.2.515.
