= Donald Fraser (geologist) =

Scottish geologist

Donald Gordon Fraser (born 30 October 1949 in Edinburgh, Scotland) is Emeritus Professor at the Department of Earth Sciences at Oxford University, a Fellow of Worcester College, Oxford, and in 2008-09 held the office of Senior Proctor within the University.

== Career ==
Fraser served as a junior research fellow at Merton College, Oxford between 1974 and 1976, and as a Fellow on the governing body of Wolfson College, Oxford 1977-78. In 1976, he began to lecture at the university in geochemistry, a position he held until his professorship in 1996. He also served as assistant professor in mineralogy at Columbia University in 1976. He served as chairman of the Faculty of Earth Sciences 1985 to 1988 and again in 1999-2001, along with the Fraser Committee on the future structure of science in Oxford in the late eighties. In 2006, he became a member of Oxford's University Council, elected unopposed, and served as senior proctor in the 2008-09 year. He was a tutorial fellow in geology at Worcester College, Oxford.

He was a senior visiting scientist at the Max Planck Institute for Chemistry, Mainz, in 1980-81, later joining CNRS Nice as a senior research associate 1984-85, and as a fellow of the Institute for the Study of the Earth's Interior (Misasa, Japan) 1997-98, returning in 2001-02 as a research fellow and afterwards as a member of its advisory panel. He also worked as a visiting associate of the California Institute of Technology 1998-99, primarily in geological and planetary sciences. He has served as chairman and managing director of university "spin-out" StatSci Europe, and as a director of Prolysis; he has also worked as a consultant to several companies in the petrochemical and energy sectors, including Royal Dutch Shell and Chevron.

He lists skiing, poetry, golf and music among his interests, and the "thermodynamic properties of molten silicates and in the adsorption of biomolecules on mineral surfaces and their role in the origin of biochirality" as research areas. He also co-authored Elementary Thermodynamics for Geologists with Bernard Wood in 1976.

He works on the origin of biological chirality, the development of early biomolecules and the origin of life. He was an opponent of Vice-Chancellor Dr John Hood's proposal for Governance reform in Oxford. He has also warned of a growing "bonus culture" in Oxford, something the University denies.
