= John M. Edmond =

British scientist (1943–2001)

John Marmion Edmond
- Born: April 27, 1943; Glasgow, Scotland, UK
- Died: April 10, 2001 (aged 57); Boston, MA, USA
- Education: University of Glasgow, University of California, San Diego
- Awards: Urey Medal (1999); Fellow of the Royal Society
- Scientific career
- Workplaces: Massachusetts Institute of Technology, University of Glasgow, University of California, San Diego, Scripps Institution of Oceanography

John Marmion Edmond FRS (April 27, 1943 – April 10, 2001) was a professor of marine geochemistry and oceanography at the Massachusetts Institute of Technology, who did pioneering work on oceanic particulate matter, the oceanic carbon dioxide cycle, trace elements, and radioisotopes. He explored and analyzed water chemistry from environments as diverse as the mid-ocean ridge hydrothermal vents to the polar oceans to remote rivers and lakes in South America, Africa, Siberia, and Tibet. He and his students and colleagues in his lab measured more chemical elements at lower concentrations in water than had ever been done before.

== Biography ==
Edmond was born on April 27, 1943, in Glasgow, Scotland, and was educated at the University of Glasgow (BSc degree, 1965) and the University of California, San Diego, where he received his PhD in 1970 at the Scripps Institution of Oceanography. He was a Fellow of the Royal Society as well as of the American Geophysical Union. He received AGU's Macelwane Medal, and the Urey Medal.

He died on April 10, 2001. Francis Albarede, President of the European Association of Geochemistry at the time of Edmond’s death said "A scientist can be extremely proud if by the end of his life he had contributed one idea that changed the human perception of the world. John Edmond left us with several of these."
