= Samuel Epstein (geochemist) =

Canadian-American geochemist

- Born: December 9, 1919; Kobryn, Belarus
- Died: September 17, 2001 (aged 81); Pasadena, California, United States
- Education: McGill University, University of Manitoba
- Known for: Helped establish the fields of stable isotope geochemistry, carbonate paleothermometry
- Awards: Wollaston Medal (1993); V. M. Goldschmidt Award (1977); Urey Medal (European Association of Geochemistry) (1995)
- Scientific career
- Fields: Geochemistry, Chemistry
- Workplaces: California Institute of Technology, University of Chicago, Canadian Atomic Energy Project
- Doctoral advisor: Carl A. Winkler
- Doctoral students: Robert N. Clayton; Hugh P. Taylor Jr.

Samuel Epstein (December 9, 1919 – September 17, 2001) was a Canadian-American geochemist who developed methods for reconstructing geologic temperature records using stable isotope geochemistry. He was elected to the United States National Academy of Sciences in 1977, and a fellow of the Royal Society of Canada in 1997.

== Early years ==
Sam Epstein was born in Kobryn, Belarus, then part of Poland, and as a child his family emigrated to Winnipeg, Manitoba. After receiving a B.Sc. in Geology and Chemistry (1941) and a M.Sc. in Chemistry (1942) from the University of Manitoba, Epstein completed his Ph.D. at McGill University under the supervision of Carl A. Winkler in 1944. His thesis focused on the synthesis and reaction kinetics of high explosives, including RDX and HMX. Epstein subsequently worked for the Canadian Atomic Energy Project for several years.

== Career ==
In 1947, Epstein moved to the United States to begin a research fellowship with Harold Urey's group at the University of Chicago. While at Chicago, Epstein, along with Ralph Buchsbaum, Heinz A. Lowenstam, C. R. McKinney and others developed the carbonate-water isotopic temperature scale, allowing ancient ocean temperatures to be determined from precise measurements of ^{18}O/^{16}O in geological samples of calcium carbonate. This method is still the most widely used geochemical climate proxy for locations and times not sampled in ice core records.

Epstein joined the faculty of the California Institute of Technology in 1952, and continued to explore the new field of stable isotope geochemistry. He and his students used mass spectrometry to study natural variations in the isotopic abundances of hydrogen, carbon, oxygen and silicon, with applications to archeology, biochemistry, climatology, and geology. He was awarded the Wollaston Medal of the Geological Society of London in 1993.

Epstein remained at Caltech as a Professor and Professor Emeritus until shortly before his death on September 17, 2001.

The European Association of Geochemistry awards a Science Innovation Award medal every five years named in his honour for work in isotope geochemistry.
