= Grenville Turner =

British geochemist (1936–2024)

Grenville Turner FRS
- Born: 1 November 1936; Todmorden, England
- Died: 22 August 2024 (aged 87); Sheffield, England
- Citizenship: British
- Education: University of Oxford; University of Cambridge
- Known for: Argon–argon dating
- Awards: Rumford Medal (1996); Urey Medal (2002); Fellow of the Royal Society; Gold Medal of the RAS
- Scientific career
- Fields: Cosmochemistry; Isotope geochemistry
- Workplaces: University of Manchester; University of Sheffield; California Institute of Technology; University of California, Berkeley
- Thesis: (1962)

Grenville Turner FRS (1 November 1936 – 22 August 2024) was a British geochemist and a research professor at the University of Manchester. He was one of the pioneers of cosmochemistry.

== Education ==
- Todmorden Grammar School
- St. John's College, Cambridge (MA)
- Balliol College, Oxford

In 1962, he was awarded his D.Phil. (Oxford University's equivalent of a PhD) in nuclear physics.

== Career ==
- University of California, Berkeley: assistant professor, 1962–64
- University of Sheffield: lecturer in physics, 1964–74, senior lecturer 1974–79, reader 1979–80, professor 1980–88
- Caltech: research associate, 1970–71
- University of Manchester: professor of isotope geochemistry, Department of Earth Sciences, 1988–
- Member of committees for SERC, the British National Space Centre and PPARC

== Scientific work ==
Turner was a leading figure in cosmochemistry since the 1960s. His pioneering work on rare gases in meteorites led him to develop the argon–argon dating technique that demonstrated the great age of meteorites and provided a precise chronology of rocks brought back by the Apollo missions. He was one of the few UK scientists to be a Principal Investigator of these Apollo samples.

His argon-dating technique involved stepped pyrolysis of the rocks to force out the argon, then determining the isotopic ratios in the gas by mass spectrometry. This was later refined by the use of lasers. These techniques have been invaluable to cosmochemists and geochemists, and have been applied (by Turner and others) to determine the geochronology of diamonds and inclusions in them, and the precise ages of mantle and crustal rocks from the Earth.

He went on to develop even better techniques, such as iodine-xenon chronology. He used laser resonance ionisation of xenon to measure samples with only a few thousand atoms of xenon; this enabled him to get accurate data from tiny samples, including individual chondrules. He could even trace secondary processes, such as alteration by heat, fluids or shock.

Turner set up the first ion microprobe in the United Kingdom intended for use primarily for examining extraterrestrial material. He used it to measure oxygen-isotope variations in the Martian meteorite ALH 84001. His results cast light on the environment in which the carbonate grains and so-called microfossils in that meteorite formed.

He was a founder member of the UK Cosmochemical Analysis Network, a network of laboratories in research institutions that analyse extraterrestrial material.

He continued to be an active researcher during retirement. In 2004, he announced a plutonium-xenon technique for dating terrestrial materials.

== Death ==
Turner died in Sheffield on 22 August 2024, at the age of 87, after being diagnosed with grade IV astrocytoma in 2022.

== Honours and awards ==
- Fellow of the Royal Society, 1980 (member of Council 1990–92)
- Fellow, Meteoritical Society, 1980
- Rumford Medal of the Royal Society, 1996
- Fellow, Geochemical Society and European Association of Geochemistry 1996
- Fellow, American Geophysical Union, 1998
- Leonard Medal of the Meteoritical Society, 1999
- Urey Medal of the European Association of Geochemistry, 2002
- Gold Medal of the Royal Astronomical Society for geophysics, 2004
