= Susan Brantley =

American geologist and geochemist

- Born: 1958 (age 67–68)
- Occupations: Geologist; geochemist; professor
- Title: Dr. Hubert Barnes and Dr. Mary Barnes Professor

Academic background
- Education: Princeton University

Susan L. Brantley (born 1958) is an American geologist and geochemist who is the Dr. Hubert Barnes and Dr. Mary Barnes Professor at Pennsylvania State University. Her research dominantly studies interactions between fluids and minerals at low temperatures, biological reactions in water-rich fluids within soils, and the geochemical processes that convert rock into soil. However, among many other topics, she has also published work on carbon dioxide emissions from volcanoes, and the environmental impact of shale gas extraction and nuclear waste disposal. During her career, Brantley has published over 200 research papers and book chapters, has been awarded academic prizes and fellowships by many of the world's leading geoscience societies, and has been described as "one of the leading aqueous geochemists of her generation."

== Awards and recognition ==
=== Fellowships and memberships ===
- Fellow of the American Geophysical Union
- Fellow of the Geological Society of America
- Fellow of the Geochemical Society
- Fellow of the European Association of Geochemistry
- Fellow of the International Association of GeoChemistry
- Member of the National Academy of Sciences
- Member of the National Academy of Engineering

=== Professional awards ===
- Robert Garrels Award, The Geobiology Society (2019)
- Urey Medal of the European Association of Geochemistry (2018)
- Geochemistry Division Medal of the American Chemical Society (2017)
- Wollaston Medal of the Geological Society of London (2016)
- Honorary doctorate, University of Lausanne, Switzerland (2013)
- Presidential Award of the Soil Science Society of America (2012)
- Honorary doctorate, University of Toulouse III - Paul Sabatier University, France (2011)
- Arthur L. Day Medal of the Geological Society of America (2011)
