= Chris Ballentine =

British geochemist

- Citizenship: British
- Education: UMIST (BSc), University of Cambridge (PhD)
- Awards: Bigsby Medal (2008); ENI award (2016); AGU Fellow (2013)
- Scientific career
- Fields: Geochemistry
- Workplaces: Paul Scherrer Institute; University of Michigan; ETH Zurich; University of Manchester; University of Oxford
- Thesis: (1992)

Chris Ballentine is a British geochemist. He is the chair of geochemistry and was head of the Department of Earth Sciences at the University of Oxford, in the United Kingdom. He uses properties of the noble gases to understand the origin and evolution of Earth's atmosphere and mantle.

== Career ==
Ballentine earned his PhD at the University of Cambridge in 1992. He went on to hold research positions at the Paul Scherrer Institut, Switzerland, the University of Michigan, and ETH Zurich, Switzerland. From 2001 to 2013, he held positions at the University of Manchester before joining the faculty at the University of Oxford.

Ballentine has held the vice-president, president, and past president positions with the European Association of Geochemistry. He is a member of the Board of Governors of the Oxford Museum of Natural History and the American Geophysical Union, as well as a former scientific steering committee member for the Deep Carbon Observatory. In 2008, he won the Geological Society of London Bigsby Medal for significant contributions to geology. The AGU chose Ballentine as a Fellow in 2013, and in 2016, he won the ENI award, given to researchers who make advanced scientific breakthroughs in the field of energy, for "New Frontiers of Hydrocarbons".

== Research initiatives ==
Ballentine has shown that by measuring noble gas isotopes, he can identify and quantify the processes controlling the origin, migration, and interaction of subsurface water, hydrocarbons, and fluids.

He has applied noble gas tools and principles to understand how natural gas fields form inside Earth, the role of groundwater in forming hydrocarbon reservoirs, and the origins of different gases on the planet. Ballentine also has developed quantitative techniques to understand how carbon dioxide behaves in the subsurface, including its role in the crustal carbon cycle, and how carbon-rich fluids have supported subsurface life over geological timescales.
