= Shuhei Ono =

Shuhei Ono is a professor of earth, atmospheric, and planetary sciences at the Massachusetts Institute of Technology. In his research, he measures isotopes of sulfur and other elements to investigate water-rock-microbe interactions, seafloor hydrothermal systems, the deep biosphere, and global sulfur cycles.

== Career ==
Ono earned his B.S. in geology in 1994 and his M.E. in economic geology in 1996 from Waseda University in Tokyo, Japan. He completed his Ph.D. in geochemistry from Pennsylvania State University in 2001. Ono joined the Geophysical Laboratory of Carnegie Institution of Washington to complete his postdoctoral research, and in 2006 received a geobiology fellowship from the Agouron Institute to support his work. In 2007, Ono became a faculty member at MIT.

Ono earned the 2017 Paul Gast Lectureship award from the European Association of Geochemistry, given to mid-career scientists who have made outstanding contributions to geochemistry.

== Research initiatives ==
Ono has developed an instrument that uses tunable infrared laser direct absorption spectroscopy to detect the ratio of different isotopes in a sample of methane, which can indicate the methane’s source. The instrument has enabled his group to discover the origins of methane from seafloor hot springs, and to understand the effects of microbial and atmospheric methane cycling on the isotopic composition of methane in a sample.

Ono's team also measures sulfur isotopes to study how early microbial life impacted atmospheric and ocean chemistry. Specifically, they are looking at Archean rocks in South Africa and Western Australia that are 4 to 2.5 billion years old. They also are using sulfur isotopes to investigate sulfur cycling within mid-ocean ridge hydrothermal vent systems and sulfate reduction in the deep subsurface.

Additionally, Ono collaborates with Massachusetts Institute of Technology Professor of Atmospheric Science Ronald Prinn to explore the natural and environmental sources of nitrous oxide, a powerful greenhouse gas and catalyst that destroys ozone.
