= William H. Casey =

William Howard Casey (born 1955) is distinguished professor of chemistry and professor of geology at the University of California, Davis. He has made major contributions in the fields of aqueous geochemistry and inorganic solution chemistry. He has in particular received international awards for his work on the use of heteronuclear ambient and high-pressure NMR spectroscopic and mass spectrometric techniques in elucidating the solution chemistry of discrete metal oxide clusters such as aluminum hydroxides and polyoxoniobates, and has been elected Fellow of the American Chemical Society and Fellow of the American Association for the Advancement of Science. The mineral Caseyite is named in his honour.

== Education ==
Casey obtained a B.A. from University of the Pacific (United States) in 1976, an M.Sc. from the University of California, Davis in 1980 and a Ph.D. from Pennsylvania State University in 1985. Following five years as a geochemist at Sandia National Laboratories he was appointed professor in Geology at University of California, Davis in 1991, and professor in Chemistry in 2005.

== Awards ==
- Fellow, American Chemical Society, 2019
- Fellow, American Association for the Advancement of Science, 2017
- Clair C. Patterson Award, Geochemical Society, 2016
- Science Innovation Award The Science innovation award and Werner Stumm medal, 2010
- Fellow, Geochemical Society
- Fellow, European Association of Geochemistry
