= Hugh Taylor =

Hugh Taylor may refer to:

- Hugh Taylor (American football) (1923–1992), American NFL football player
- Hugh Taylor (priest) (died 1585), English Catholic martyr
- Hugh Taylor (rugby union) (1894–1956), Australian rugby union player
- Hugh Taylor (Australian politician) (1823–1897), New South Wales politician
- Hugh Taylor (MP) (1817–1900), British Member of Parliament for Tynemouth and North Shields
- Hugh P. Taylor Jr. (1932–2021), American geochemist
- Sir Hugh Stott Taylor (1890–1974), English chemist
- Sir Hugh Taylor (civil servant) (born 1950), former Permanent Secretary at the Department of Health
- Hugh Taylor (archivist) (1920–2005), English-born Canadian archivist

== See also ==
- Hugh Taylor Birch State Park, a state park in Florida, USA
