= Wallace Smith Broecker =

American geochemist (1931–2019)

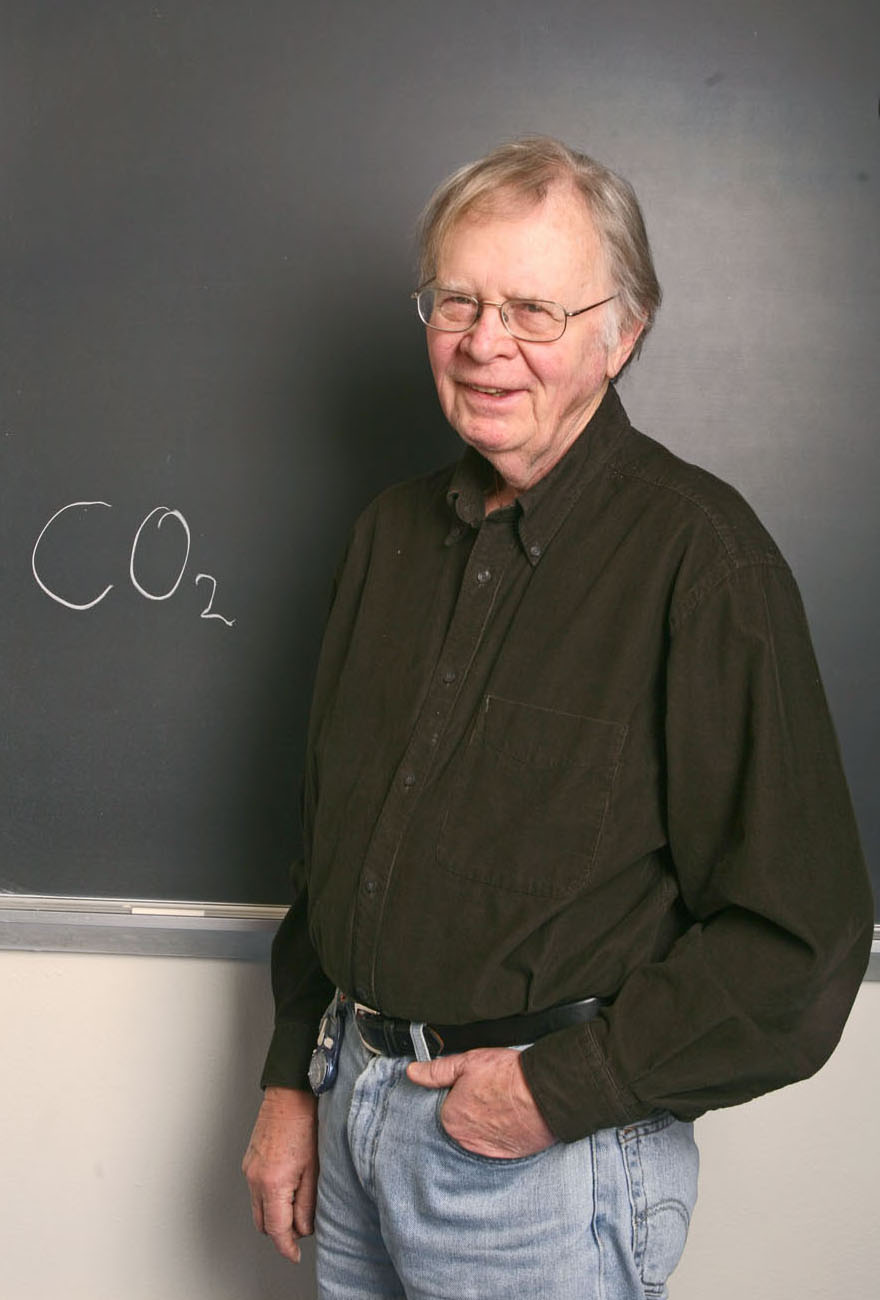
- Broecker c. 2010
- Born: November 29, 1931; Chicago, Illinois, U.S.
- Died: February 18, 2019 (aged 87); New York City, U.S.
- Education: Columbia University (BA, PhD)
- Known for: Global Warming
- Spouses: Grace Carder; Elizabeth Clark
- Awards: Maurice Ewing Medal (1979); A.G. Huntsman Medal (1985); Vetlesen Prize (1987); Alexander Agassiz Medal (1986); Urey Medal (1990); Wollaston Medal (1990); Roger Revelle Medal (1995); National Medal of Science (1996); Tyler Prize for Environmental Achievement (2002); Crafoord Prize (2006); BBVA Foundation Frontiers of Knowledge Award (2008); Phi Beta Kappa Award in Science (2012)
- Scientific career
- Fields: Geochronology, chemical oceanography, climate change
- Workplaces: Columbia University, Lamont–Doherty Earth Observatory; Arizona State University, Julie Ann Wrigley Global Institute of Sustainability

Wallace "Wally" Smith Broecker (November 29, 1931 – February 18, 2019) was an American geochemist. He was the Newberry Professor in the Department of Earth and Environmental Sciences at Columbia University, a scientist at Columbia's Lamont–Doherty Earth Observatory and a sustainability fellow at Arizona State University. He developed the idea of a global "conveyor belt" linking the circulation of the global ocean and made major contributions to the science of the carbon cycle and the use of chemical tracers and isotope dating in oceanography. Broecker popularized the term "global warming". He received the Crafoord Prize and the Vetlesen Prize.

== Life ==
Born in Chicago in 1931, he attended Wheaton College and interacted with J. Laurence Kulp, Paul Gast and Karl Turekian. At Wheaton, he met his wife Grace Carder. Broecker then transferred to Columbia University, graduating in 1953 with a B.A. and a Ph.D. in 1958. At Columbia, he worked at the Lamont Geological Observatory with W. Maurice Ewing and Walter Bucher.

In 1975, Broecker popularized the term global warming when he published a paper titled: "Climatic Change: Are we on the Brink of a Pronounced Global Warming?"; the phrase had previously appeared in a 1957 newspaper report about Roger Revelle's research.

Broecker co-wrote an account of climate science with the science journalist, Robert Kunzig. This included a discussion of the work of Broecker's Columbia colleague Klaus Lackner in capturing CO_{2} from the atmosphere—which Broecker believed must play a vital role in reducing emissions and countering global warming. Broecker was described in the New York Times as a geoengineering pioneer.

Broecker had 8 children, 7 grandchildren, and 7 great-grandchildren. His wife Grace E. Broecker (née Carder) died in 2007. They were together for 55 years. Broecker married Elizabeth Clark in 2009. He died of congestive heart failure in New York City on February 18, 2019. Days before his death, he gave a livestreamed video message to his fellow scientists, where he said that humankind was not moving quickly enough to stop global warming and urged the scientific community to "seriously study more extreme solutions to the climate crisis."

== Research ==
Broecker's areas of research included Pleistocene geochronology, radiocarbon dating and chemical oceanography, including oceanic mixing based on stable and radioisotope distribution. This included research on the biogeochemical cycles of the element carbon and on the record of climate change contained in polar ice and ocean sediments.

Broecker authored more than 500 journal articles and 17 books. He is perhaps best known for his discovery of the role played by the ocean in triggering the abrupt climate changes which punctuated glacial time, in particular the development and popularization of the idea of a global "ocean conveyor" linking the circulation of the world's oceans. However, his contributions stretch far beyond the "conveyor"; his work is the foundation of carbon cycle science, and his applications of radiocarbon to paleoceanography are landmarks in the field. His work with chemical tracers in the ocean is integral to modern chemical oceanography; indeed, his textbook "Tracers in the Sea", authored with Tsung-Hung Peng, is still cited in the contemporary literature 25 years after its publication.

Broecker wrote about his research, on mode changes in the thermohaline circulation: "We have clear evidence that different parts of the earth's climate system are linked in very subtle yet dramatic ways. The climate system has jumped from one mode of operation to another in the past. We are trying to understand how the earth's climate system is engineered, so we can understand what it takes to trigger mode switches. Until we do, we cannot make good predictions about future climate change."

== Fellowships and awards ==
Broecker was a Fellow of the American Academy of Arts and Sciences and the National Academy of Sciences, Foreign Member of the Royal Society, a resident member of the American Philosophical Society, and a Fellow of the American Geophysical Union and European Geophysical Union. He received the A.G. Huntsman Award for Excellence in the Marine Sciences from the Royal Society of Canada in 1985, the Crafoord Prize in Geoscience, the National Medal of Science in 1996, Maurice W. Ewing Medal of the American Geophysical Union, the Alexander Agassiz Medal of the National Academy of Sciences, the Urey Medal of the European Association of Geochemistry, the V. M. Goldschmidt Award from the Geochemical Society, the Vetlesen Prize from the G. Unger Vetlesen Foundation, the Wollaston Medal of the Geological Society of London, the Roger Revelle Medal of the American Geophysical Union, the Tyler Prize for Environmental Achievement from the University of Southern California, the Blue Planet Prize from The Asahi Glass Foundation, the 2008 Benjamin Franklin Medal in Earth and Environmental Science from The Franklin Institute in Philadelphia, Pennsylvania, and the 2008 BBVA Foundation Frontiers of Knowledge Award in Climate Change.

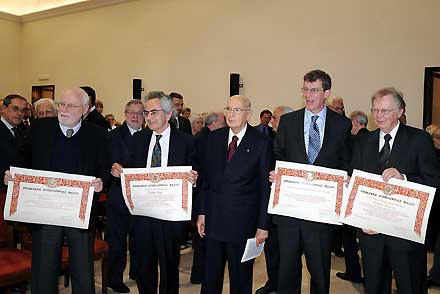
Broecker (right) with the other 2008 Balzan Prize winners and Giorgio Napolitano, President of Italy

In 2008 Broecker was the recipient of the Balzan Prize for outstanding achievement in science. His citation was made by Enric Banda (Research Professor of Geophysics at the Institute of Earth Sciences in Barcelona):

For his extraordinary contributions to the understanding of climate change through his discoveries concerning the role of the oceans and their interactions with the atmosphere, as well as the role of glacial changes and the records contained in ice cores and ocean sediments. His contributions have been significant in understanding both gradual and abrupt climate change.

In 2009, Broecker was awarded the BBVA Foundation Frontiers of Knowledge Award in the Climate Change category for his research into the world's oceans, pioneering "the development of Earth System Science as the basis for understanding global climate change, both past and present". The award certificate also highlights "his holistic approach", which has led him to identify "the mechanisms of abrupt climate change".

Broecker received honorary doctorates from Cambridge University, Oxford University, Pennsylvania State University, Harvard University, and Southern Methodist University, among others. On May 28, 2015, he was awarded an honorary doctorate by Harvard University.

== Selected books ==
- Broecker, Wallace S.; Oversby, Virginia M. (1971), Chemical Equilibria in the Earth (PDF), McGraw-Hill Education, p. 304, ISBN 0-07-007997-8.
- — (1974), Chemical oceanography, Harcourt Brace Jovanovich, pp. 214, ISBN 0-15-506437-1.
- —; Peng, Tsung-Hung (1982), Tracers in the Sea (PDF), Eldigio Press, ISBN 0-9617511-0-X.
- — (1988), How to Build a Habitable Planet (PDF), Eldigio Press, ISBN 0-9617511-2-6.
- —; Peng, Tsung-Hung (1993), Greenhouse puzzles, Lamont–Doherty Geological Observatory of Columbia University.
- — (1995), The glacial world according to Wally (PDF), Eldigio Press.
- — (1998), Greenhouse puzzles: Keeling's world, Martin's world, Walker's world (PDF), Eldigio Press.
- —; Kunzig, Robert (2008), Fixing Climate: What Past Climate Changes Reveal About the Current Threat--and How to Counter It, Hill and Wang, US/Profile Books, UK, ISBN 978-0-8090-4501-3.
- — (2010), The Great Ocean Conveyor, Discovering the Trigger for Abrupt Climate Change, Princeton University Press, ISBN 978-0-691-14354-5.
- — (2016), A Geochemist in his Garden of Eden (PDF), Eldigio Press.

== See also ==
- Carbon dioxide removal
- List of geophysicists
