= Desmond McConnell =

British mineralogist

James Desmond Caldwell McConnell FRS
- Born: July 3, 1930; Lisburn, Northern Ireland
- Died: January 2, 2026 (aged 95); Cambridge
- Education: Queens University, Belfast (BSc, 1951); University of Cambridge (PhD, 1956)
- Awards: Hallimond Lecture (1971); Fellow of the Royal Society (1987); Humboldt Prize for Mineral Physics (1996)
- Scientific career
- Fields: Mineralogy
- Workplaces: University of Oxford, University of Cambridge
- Thesis: The composite dolerite at Ballycraigy, Larne N.I. (1956)

James Desmond Caldwell McConnell FRS (1930 – 2026) was a mineralogist, who was a lecturer in the University of Cambridge (1955 – 1982), director of the rock physics laboratory at Schlumberger Cambridge Research (1983 – 1986), and then Professor of the Physics and Chemistry of Minerals at the University of Oxford, from 1986 to 1995. He was elected a Fellow of the Royal Society in 1987.

== Early life ==
McConnell was born in Lisburn, Northern Ireland in 1930, the eldest son of Samuel McConnell, primary school teacher, and Cathleen (nee Coulter), a secretary. He studied geology at Queen's, Belfast, before moving to Cambridge in 1952 to start a PhD.

In Cambridge, he was a founding fellow of Churchill College, and lecturer in the department of Earth Sciences from 1962 to 1982. In 1986, McConnell moved the University of Oxford to take up the Professorship of Physics and Chemistry of Minerals in the Department of Geology and Mineralogy. He also took up a Professorial Fellowship at St Hugh's College, Oxford at the same time. McConnell retired from both roles in 1995, and was later elected an Honorary Fellow at St Hugh's.

== Research career ==
McConnell's research interests focussed on the area of the structures of crystalline materials. During his PhD work, he used X-ray techniques to investigate the crystal structures of silicate minerals that contained water. Later, he developed theories to explain the general features of complex crystalline silicate minerals, in particular those that form solid solutions.

In 1969, McConnell got the chance to work on some Lunar rock samples, collected during the Apollo 11 mission. Stuart Agrell, a colleague in Cambridge, as the only non-US principal investigator working on the petrology of the collected samples, brought some samples to the UK in September 1969. The results of their analyses were published early the next year.

From 1983 to 1986, McConnell was the director of the rock physics laboratory at the Schlumberger Cambridge research centre. This gave him an opportunity to work on experimental and theoretical investigations on the properties of some industrially-important minerals, including clays and gypsum.
