= Science Innovation Award =

The Science Innovation Award is an award bestowed annually by the European Association of Geochemistry on a scientist who has made "a particularly important and innovative breakthrough in geochemistry", and consists of a medal and certificate. The specific subject area of the award varies according to a five-year cycle:

Medal cycle
Years	Medal
2008, 2013 etc.	the Nicholas Shackleton medal for work in climatology
2009, 2014 etc.	the Samuel Epstein medal for work in isotope geochemistry
2010, 2015 etc.	the Werner Stumm medal for work in low temperature and surface geochemistry
2011, 2016 etc.	the Ted Ringwood medal for work in petrology and mineral physics
2012, 2017 etc.	the Heinz A. Lowenstam medal for work in biogeochemistry

Former recipients of the Science Innovation Award are, in reverse chronological order:

Science Innovation Award winners
Year	Name(s)	Medal
2026	Elizabeth Cottrell, National Museum of Natural History, Smithsonian Institution, USA	Ted Ringwood Medal
2025	Christine Putnis, University of Münster, Germany	Werner Stumm Medal
2024	Evelyn Füri, Centre de Recherches Pétrographiques et Géochimiques, France	Samuel Epstein Medal
2023	Rosalind Rickaby, University of Oxford, UK	Nicholas Shackleton Medal
2022	Lenny Winkel, ETH Zürich, Switzerland	Heinz A. Lowenstam Medal
2021	Fabrice Gaillard, Institute of Earth Sciences at Orléans, France	Ted Ringwood Medal
2020	Kevin Russo, Pacific Northwest National Laboratory, United States	Werner Stumm Medal
2019	Ariel Anbar, Arizona State University, United States	Samuel Epstein Medal
2018	Jess Adkins, Caltech, United States	Nicholas Shackleton Medal
2017	Bo Thamrup, University of Southern Denmark, Denmark	Heinz A. Lowenstam medal
2016	Jon Blundy, University of Bristol, United Kingdom	Ted Ringwood Medal
2015	Philippe Van Cappellen, University of Waterloo, Canada	Werner Stumm Medal
2014	James Farquhar, University of Maryland, United States	Samuel Epstein Medal
2013	Jérôme Chappellaz, French National Center for Scientific Research and Joseph Fourier University, France	Nicholas Shackleton Medal
2012	Katherine Freeman, Pennsylvania State University, United States and Daniel Sigman, Princeton University, United States	Heinz A. Lowenstam medal
2011	Kei Hirose, Tokyo Institute of Technology, Japan	Ted Ringwood Medal
2010	William H. Casey, UC Davis, United States	Werner Stumm Medal
2009	John M. Eiler, Caltech, United States	Samuel Epstein Medal
2008	R. Lawrence Edwards, University of Minnesota, United States	Nicholas Shackleton Medal

== See also ==
- List of geology awards
