= Geochemical Perspectives Letters =

- Discipline: Geochemistry
- Language: English

Publication details
- History: 2015–present
- Publisher: European Association of Geochemistry
- Frequency: Semi-annual
- Open access: Yes
- Impact factor: 4.452 (2019)

Standard abbreviations
- ISO 4: Geochem. Perspect. Lett.

Indexing
- ISSN: 2410-339X (print); 2410-3403 (web)

Links
- Journal homepage

Geochemical Perspectives Letters is a peer-reviewed open access scholarly journal publishing original research in geochemistry. It is published by the European Association for Geochemistry.

== Abstracting and indexing ==
The journal is abstracted and indexed in:

- DOAJ
- Scopus
- Science Citation Index Expanded
- Essential Science Indicators
- Current Contents Physical, Chemical & Earth Sciences
