= Ice Memory =

Ice Core preservation organization

Ice Memory is an international scientific initiative that collects and preserves ice cores from selected endangered mountain glaciers for future scientific research. Initiated in 2015 by research institutions in France, Italy and Switzerland, the project seeks to preserve climate and environmental records contained in glacier ice as glaciers retreat and some of these records are altered or lost.

Ice cores contain physical and chemical records of past atmospheric and environmental conditions, including trapped gases, aerosols, pollutants and stable isotopes. Ice Memory collects cores for both current research and long-term preservation, with the aim of making samples available for future analyses as scientific methods and technologies develop.

The initiative operates the Ice Memory Sanctuary, an ice-core repository near the French–Italian Concordia Station on the Antarctic Plateau. Inaugurated on 14 January 2026, the repository uses the naturally low temperatures of Antarctica for long-term storage without mechanical refrigeration. The first ice cores deposited there were collected from the Mont Blanc massif in France and Grand Combin in Switzerland.

== Background ==
=== Ice cores as climate and environmental archives ===
Ice cores are used to reconstruct past climate and environmental conditions over timescales ranging from decades to hundreds of thousands of years. As snow accumulates and is compressed into ice, it can preserve atmospheric gases, aerosols, dust and other impurities, while the stable isotope composition of the ice provides information about past climatic conditions. These records have contributed to reconstructions of changes in atmospheric composition, temperature, volcanic activity and human-induced pollution.

Some of the longest ice-core records have been obtained in Antarctica and Greenland, where continuous sequences can extend over several hundred thousand years. Ice cores from high-altitude mountain glaciers generally cover shorter periods, but can provide regional records of environmental and atmospheric change at lower latitudes and in areas where polar ice cores cannot provide equivalent information.

The scientific value of ice core archives was demonstrated by studies of deep Antarctic ice cores, notably those drilled at Vostok Station. In 1987, analyses of the Vostok core produced continuous records extending back approximately 160,000 years. Measurements of deuterium in the ice were used to reconstruct past Antarctic temperatures, while air trapped in the ice provided a direct record of past atmospheric carbon dioxide concentrations. Comparison of these records showed a close relationship between atmospheric CO2 concentrations and glacial–interglacial climate variations, leading researchers to investigate the role of greenhouse gases in amplifying climate changes associated with orbital forcing.

Subsequent measurements reconstructed atmospheric methane concentrations and extended the Vostok climate and atmospheric record to approximately 420,000 years. The extended record showed that atmospheric CO2 and CH4 concentrations were closely correlated with Antarctic temperature over four glacial–interglacial cycles, providing evidence for the relationship between greenhouse gases and long-term climate variations.

Advances in analytical techniques have expanded the range of information that can be obtained from ice cores. In addition to established chemical and isotopic analyses, studies have recovered microorganisms, microbial DNA and viruses from glacier ice, allowing researchers to investigate past microbial communities and their relationships with environmental conditions. Developments in DNA sequencing and metagenomics have made it possible to characterize these low-biomass communities in greater detail, although contamination and preservation remain methodological challenges.

These approaches have also been applied to mountain-glacier archives. During an Ice Memory expedition to Svalbard in 2023, researchers involved in the IceLife project collected ice from the Holtedahlfonna glacier for studies of microbial communities preserved in the ice. The project uses genome sequencing alongside chemical analysis, microbiology and molecular ecology to investigate relationships between microorganisms and past environmental conditions.

=== Ice Memory Sanctuary ===
==== Location and storage ====
The Ice Memory Sanctuary is a long-term ice-core repository located near the French–Italian Concordia Station on the Antarctic Plateau. It was inaugurated on 14 January 2026, when the first ice cores preserved in the sanctuary were deposited there

The sanctuary consists of a cave excavated in the snow, approximately 35 metres long, five metres wide and five metres high. It maintains a naturally stable temperature of around −50 °C to −52 °C and does not require energy for mechanical refrigeration. The use of the naturally low Antarctic temperatures is intended to provide long-term cold storage without dependence on refrigeration systems.

==== Collection ====
The first ice cores deposited in the Sanctuary came from the Col du Dôme in the Mont Blanc massif, drilled in 2016, and Grand Combin in the Swiss Alps, drilled in 2025. Together, the samples weigh approximately 1.7 tonnes. They were transported to Antarctica under refrigerated conditions during a journey of approximately 50 days before reaching Concordia Station.

The collection is intended to expand with ice cores recovered from mountain glaciers in different regions of the world. Samples already collected from sites in Bolivia, Tajikistan, Svalbard and Russia are among those expected to be transferred to the Sanctuary. Further drilling campaigns are planned as part of the initiative, although the composition of the future collection remains dependent on the recovery and transfer of additional cores.

==== Access and governance ====
The Sanctuary is intended to make preserved ice cores available to future generations of researchers. The Ice Memory Foundation is developing a framework governing scientific access to the collection, while questions concerning the long-term legal ownership of the cores remain unresolved.

The Sanctuary operates within the framework of the Antarctic Treaty System, under which Antarctica is reserved for peaceful purposes and scientific cooperation. The Ice Memory Foundation has also held discussions with UNESCO and the World Meteorological Organization concerning the development of an international governance framework for the collection. As of 2026, this long-term governance framework had not yet been finalized.

== History ==
The Ice Memory project originated in 2014 from discussions involving French glaciologists Jérôme Chappellaz and Patrick Ginot at the Laboratory of Glaciology and Environmental Geophysics in Grenoble (IGE). The project was formally launched in 2015, initially involving French, Italian and Swiss research institutions, including the CNRS, the IRD, Université Grenoble Alpes, the Italian CNR, Ca' Foscari University of Venice and the Paul Scherrer Institute.

The first Ice Memory drilling campaign took place at the Col du Dôme, in the Mont Blanc massif, in August 2016. An international team of French, Italian, Russian and American researchers extracted three ice cores extending through approximately 128 metres of glacier ice. In February 2017, the project received the patronage of the French and Italian national commissions for UNESCO, followed by an international launch at UNESCO headquarters in Paris in March 2017.

Following the Col du Dôme campaign, the programme expanded to other mountain regions. In May and June 2017, its second drilling expedition was carried out on Illimani in Bolivia, where two ice cores reaching bedrock were recovered at an altitude of more than 6,300 metres. Further drilling campaigns followed in 2018 on Belukha and Mount Elbrus in Russia, involving collaborations between European and Russian research institutions.

The initiative also developed an institutional framework for the long-term preservation of the collected cores. The UNESCO Executive Board adopted decisions in 2017 and 2018 supporting the safeguarding of glacier archives and the development of the Ice Memory initiative. In 2021, seven French, Italian and Swiss scientific institutions established the Ice Memory Foundation to coordinate the initiative internationally. Its founding institutions were CNRS, IRD, Université Grenoble Alpes and the French Polar Institute (IPEV) in France, the CNR and Ca' Foscari University of Venice in Italy, and the Paul Scherrer Institute in Switzerland.

During the early 2020s, Ice Memory continued to expand its collection through international drilling campaigns. Its eighth drilling operation took place on Svalbard in 2023, involving researchers from French, Italian and Norwegian institutions. In parallel, the Foundation developed plans for a permanent Sanctuary in Antarctica, in cooperation with the French and Italian polar programmes responsible for Concordia Station.

In 2024, the proposed long-term storage of Ice Memory cores in Antarctica received approval following consideration at the 46th Antarctic Treaty Consultative Meeting. The Sanctuary was subsequently constructed near Concordia Station, and the first ice cores were transported from Europe to Antarctica in late 2025. The Ice Memory Sanctuary was inaugurated on 14 January 2026, marking the beginning of long-term storage of the collection in Antarctica.

== Drilling programme ==
Ice Memory drilling campaigns target high-altitude glaciers selected for their potential to preserve climate and environmental records. During drilling, cylindrical sections of ice are progressively extracted, documented and packaged for transport under refrigerated conditions. Depending on the expedition, cores may be allocated for contemporary scientific analysis or for long-term preservation in the Ice Memory Sanctuary.

The programme began at the Col du Dôme in France in 2016 and subsequently expanded to glaciers in the Andes, the Caucasus, the Altai Mountains, the Alps and the Arctic. Some drilling attempts have been affected by meltwater, ice conditions or logistical constraints, and have not always succeeded in recovering complete cores to bedrock.

Year	Glacier / site	Country / region	Outcome
2016	Col du Dôme, Mont Blanc massif	France	Three 128 m cores recovered
2017	Illimani, Andes	Bolivia	Two deep cores, 134 m and 137 m, recovered
2018	Belukha, Altai Mountains	Russia	Two cores, 160 m and 106 m, recovered
2018	Mount Elbrus, Caucasus	Russia	Two cores, 150 m and 120 m, recovered; drilling did not reach bedrock
2020	Corbassière Glacier, Grand Combin	Switzerland	Three shallow cores recovered; deep drilling unsuccessful
2021	Colle Gnifetti, Monte Rosa	Switzerland/Italy	Deep ice cores recovered
2022	Kilimanjaro	Tanzania	Deep drilling unsuccessful
2023	Holtedahlfonna, Svalbard	Norway	Three deep cores recovered despite substantial meltwater
2023	Colle del Lys, Monte Rosa	Italy	Ice cores recovered
2025	Corbassière Glacier, Grand Combin	Switzerland	Two cores reaching bedrock, 99.5 m and 98.9 m
2025	Kon Chukurbashi, Pamir	Tajikistan	Two cores, 104.7 m and 105 m, recovered

The first campaigns established the approach used by the programme for collecting ice both for scientific analysis and for long-term preservation. At the Col du Dôme in 2016, three deep ice cores were recovered, marking the first drilling operation of the Ice Memory initiative. The following year, the expedition to Illimani extended the programme to the tropical Andes and recovered two cores reaching bedrock at more than 6,300 metres above sea level. Subsequent campaigns in the Altai Mountains and Caucasus expanded the geographical scope of the programme to Russia.

Several campaigns have also illustrated the difficulties involved in recovering ice archives from warming mountain glaciers. At the Corbassière Glacier on Grand Combin, a 2020 attempt to obtain a deep core was unsuccessful. Analysis of firn cores collected at the site subsequently showed that meltwater had altered some of the chemical signals preserved in the glacier. A second campaign in 2025 used an electrothermal drill to penetrate melt-affected layers and recovered two cores reaching bedrock at depths of 99.5 and 98.9 metres.

Similar challenges were encountered during the 2023 expedition to Holtedahlfonna in Svalbard, where researchers encountered unexpectedly large quantities of meltwater within the glacier. Despite these conditions, three deep ice cores were recovered. The programme has also incorporated cores obtained through collaborations with other research projects. In 2025, an expedition to the Kon Chukurbashi ice cap in the Pamir Mountains of Tajikistan recovered two cores approximately 105 metres long, one of which was designated for long-term preservation by Ice Memory. Preliminary estimates indicated that the ice could contain a climate record extending back at least approximately 700 years.

== Organisation and governance ==
The Ice Memory initiative is coordinated by the Ice Memory Foundation, established in 2021 by scientific institutions in France, Italy and Switzerland. The Foundation is hosted by the Université Grenoble Alpes Foundation and is responsible for coordinating the initiative’s international scientific and institutional strategy, supporting the collection and preservation of ice cores, and developing arrangements for their long-term management.

The Foundation is overseen by a strategic board composed of representatives of research institutions and scientists from several countries. As of 2026, it was chaired by Swiss climate scientist Thomas Stocker, with Carlo Barbante and Jérôme Fort serving as vice-chairs.

Legal and institutional questions concerning the long-term status of the collection are also the subject of a research programme established in 2023, the Ice Memory Law and Governance Chair. The programme examines issues including ownership of collected ice cores, the legal status of samples stored in Antarctica, access to associated scientific data and possible models for international governance.
