= Philip England =

British geophysicist

Philip England FRS
- Born: 30 April 1951 (age 75)
- Education: University of Bristol; University of Oxford
- Awards: Murchison Medal; Gold Medal of the Royal Astronomical Society
- Scientific career
- Fields: Geophysics
- Workplaces: University of Cambridge; Harvard University; Department of Earth Sciences, University of Oxford; Exeter College, Oxford
- Website: www.earth.ox.ac.uk/people/profiles/academic/philip

Philip Christopher England FRS (born 30 April 1951) is a British geophysicist and former Chair of Geology at the Department of Earth Sciences, University of Oxford, whose research centres upon the evolution, deformation and metamorphism of mountain ranges and the development of island arcs. He has widely used applied mathematics to model mountain building, proving that they behave as extremely viscous fluids.

== Early life and education ==
England was born on 30 April 1951. He studied physics at the University of Bristol, graduating with a Bachelor of Science (BSc) degree in 1972. He then moved to the University of Oxford to undertake research in geophysics, receiving his Doctor of Philosophy (DPhil) degree in 1976.

== Academic career ==
England began his academic career in the Department of Geodesy and Geophysics, University of Cambridge: first as a NERC research fellow (1977–1979), then as an IBM research fellow (1979–1981). From 1981 to 1986, he was an assistant professor then associate professor at Harvard University. In 1986, he returned to the University of Oxford where he had been appointed a lecturer in geophysics and elected a Fellow of Exeter College, Oxford. In 2000, he was elected to the Chair of Geology. He served as Head of the Department of Earth Sciences from 2004 to 2011.

== Awards and honours ==
He was awarded the Murchison Medal of the Geological Society of London in 2004, and the Gold Medal of the Royal Astronomical Society in 2016. He was elected a Fellow of the Royal Society (FRS) in 1999.

== Personal life ==
His daughter is the middle-distance runner, Hannah England.
