= USS Cape Johnson (AP-172) =

United States Navy troop transport ship

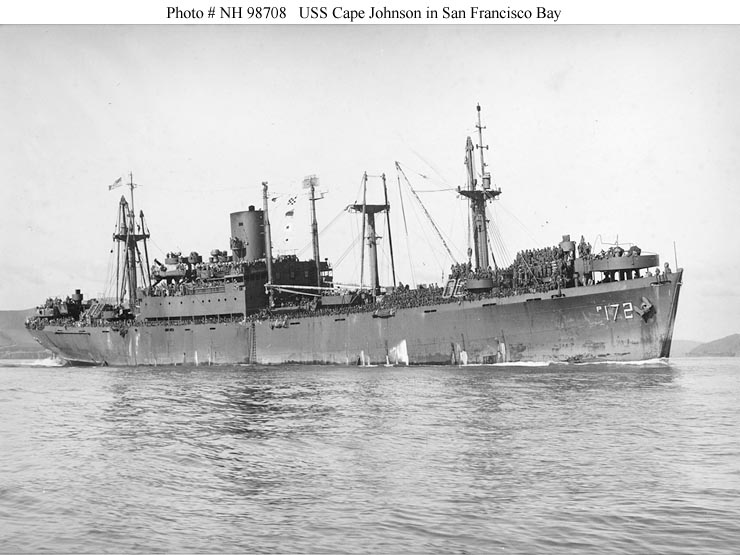
- USS Cape Johnson, San Francisco Bay, 1944

History

United States
- Name: USS Cape Johnson
- Builder: Consolidated Steel Corporation, Wilmington, Los Angeles
- Launched: 20 February 1943
- Commissioned: 1 June 1944
- Decommissioned: 25 July 1946
- Honors and awards: 2 battle stars (World War II)
- Fate: Returned to owners, 26 July 1946; Sold for scrapping, 10 June 1963

General characteristics
- Type: Type C1-B cargo ship
- Displacement: 5,668 long tons (5,759 t)
- Length: 417 ft 9 in (127.33 m)
- Beam: 60 ft (18 m)
- Draft: 22 ft 3 in (6.78 m)
- Propulsion: Steam turbine, single propeller, 4,000 hp (2,983 kW)
- Speed: 15 knots (28 km/h; 17 mph)
- Capacity: 72,168 cubic feet
- Troops: 1,288
- Complement: 371
- Armament: 1 × 5"/38 caliber gun; 4 × 3"/50 caliber guns

USS Cape Johnson (AP-172), was a United States Navy troop transport ship that was used in the South Pacific during World War II. The ship was named for a cape off the coast of Washington state.

== Service history ==
=== Construction and commissioning, 1943–1944 ===
Cape Johnson, a 5,668-ton Maritime Commission C1-B type cargo ship, was built at Wilmington, Los Angeles. She was launched on 20 February 1943 by Consolidated Steel Corporation, Ltd., Wilmington, Los Angeles, under a Maritime Commission contract and sponsored by Mrs. A. C. Steward. The ship was converted to a troop transport by Los Angeles Shipbuilding and Dry Dock Co. capable of carrying 1,575 troops. Cape Johnson was acquired by the Navy under bareboat charter and commissioned on 1 June 1944 and then reported to the Pacific Fleet.

=== 1944–1946 ===
Cape Johnson was initially used to redistribute Army and Marine forces between the Marianas and bases in the South Pacific. In November 1944 she arrived with a supply echelon off the assault areas at Leyte in the Philippines and then landed her troops at Samar. In January 1945, Cape Johnson landed troops in Lingayen Gulf during the initial assault on Luzon Island. In mid-February she arrived off Iwo Jima with Marine Corps troops and cargo, which she put ashore as needed through the end of March. The transport then returned to San Francisco and carried troops from there to Manila.

With the bitter fighting on the island over, Cape Johnson embarked men of the 5th Marines, whom she carried to Pearl Harbor. Sailing on to San Francisco, where she arrived on 22 April 1945, Cape Johnson transported troops from the west coast to Manila, and on 16 August cleared the Philippines for Pearl Harbor. With occupation troops loaded there, the transport arrived at Wakayama, Honshū, Japan on 27 September, and then began transpacific crossings returning servicemen to the States. She was decommissioned 25 July 1946 and returned to her former owner the next day. The ship was sold for scrapping, on 10 June 1963, to Zidell Explorations, Inc., Portland, Oregon.

== Harry Hess ==
The American geologist Harry Hess commanded the USS Cape Johnson during her commission. In addition to his Naval duties, Hess carefully tracked his travel routes to Pacific Ocean landings on the Marianas, Philippines, and Iwo Jima, continuously using his ship's echo sounder. This unplanned wartime scientific surveying enabled Hess to collect ocean floor profiles across the North Pacific Ocean, resulting in the discovery of flat-topped submarine volcanoes, which he termed guyots. This information led to many discoveries which helped to form the basis of the theory of plate tectonics.

== Awards ==
Cape Johnson received two battle stars for World War II service.
