= Bernard Wood (geologist) =

British geologist

- Other name: Bernie Wood
- Citizenship: United Kingdom
- Education: University of London (BSc), University of Leeds (MSc), University of Newcastle-upon-Tyne (PhD)
- Known for: Trace element partitioning, Piston-cylinder apparatus
- Awards: FRS (1998), MAE (2018)
- Scientific career
- Fields: Experimental petrology
- Workplaces: University of Oxford
- Website: https://www.earth.ox.ac.uk/people/bernie-wood/

Bernard (Bernie) Wood FRS MAE is a British geologist, and professor of mineralogy and senior research fellow at the University of Oxford. He specializes in the thermodynamics of geological systems, using experimental techniques. He is a prominent figure in the field of experimental petrology, having received multiple awards throughout his career and taught at several universities worldwide.

== Education ==
Wood is originally from London and was educated at William Ellis School (Highgate, London) and the Northern Polytechnic (Holloway, London), where he earned a BSc University of London in 1967. He also earned an MSc from the University of Leeds in 1968, as well as a PhD in geophysics from the University of Newcastle-upon-Tyne in 1972.

== Career ==
Wood has taught and conducted research at several universities across Europe, North America, and Australia.

Following his PhD studies, he taught at the University of California, Berkeley, and at the University of Manchester. He was then a postdoctoral fellow at the Geophysical Laboratory of the Carnegie Institution of Washington, after which he became principal scientist at Rockwell Hanford Operations.

In 1982, Wood moved to the Department of Geological Sciences at Northwestern University as a professor, and he was chair of that department from 1985 to 1988.

In 1989, he returned to the UK and became professor at the Department of Earth Sciences at the University of Bristol, having also been head of department from 1994 to 1997. His impact there was immense: "he helped mold Bristol into a powerhouse of Earth sciences from quite humble beginnings", said Jonathan Blundy. From 1995 to 1996, he was guest professor at the Mineralogisches Institut Universität Freiburg, in Germany.

In 2005, he was a professor and a Federation Fellow at Macquarie University, in Australia.

Since 2007, he has been based at the Department of Earth Sciences of the University of Oxford, where he installed the Experimental Petrology laboratory.

== Research ==
Wood initially became known for his work on geothermometry and geobarometry and started performing experiments at the University of Manchester in 1972. While at Northwestern he worked on the mineralogical changes responsible for the major seismic discontinuities in the Earth's mantle with student Craig Bina. At Bristol Wood became known for his work on the behavior of trace elements. With Jonathan Blundy he developed models to study compatibility and predict trace element partitioning between crystals and melts, which are relevant for igneous differentiation. He also developed a model of the accretion and early differentiation of the Earth with student Jon Wade. At Oxford he worked with post-doc Ekaterina Kiseeva on partitioning into sulphides in igneous processes. Also at Oxford, he collaborated with Alex Halliday.

=== Piston-cylinder apparatus ===
Wood's laboratories use piston-cylinder (PC) apparatus. Together with Fred Wheeler, head of workshop at the University of Bristol he designed an inexpensive, simplified version which is widely used.

=== Books ===
Holloway, J. R., & Wood, B. J. (1989). Simulating the Earth: Experimental Geochemistry. Springer.

Wood, B. J., & Fraser, D. G. (1976). Elementary Thermodynamics for Geologists. Oxford University Press.

== Honors and awards ==
Wood is a Fellow of the American Geophysical Union, and he has received awards from a number of other learned societies including the Mineralogical Society of America, the Geochemical Society, the Mineralogical Society of Great Britain and Ireland, the European Geosciences Union, the Alexander von Humboldt Stiftung (DE), the Max Planck Gesellschaft (DE), the Deutsche Mineralogische Gesellschaft, and the Geological Society of London.

- 2018 Elected a Member of the Academia Europaea (MAE)
- 2014 Roebling Medal of the Mineralogical Society of America
- 2013 Harry H. Hess Award
- 2012 Abraham G. Werner Medal, German Mineralogical Society
- 2003 V. M. Goldschmidt Award
- 2001 Fellow of the American Geophysical Union
- 1999 Max Planck Research Prize, Max Planck Society
- 1998 Elected Fellow of the Royal Society
- 1997 Arthur Holmes Medal
- 1997 Murchison Medal, Geological Society of London
- 1991 Schlumberger Medal, Mineralogical Society
- 1984 MSA Award, Mineralogical Society of America
