= Janne Blichert-Toft =

Danish geochemist (born 1953)

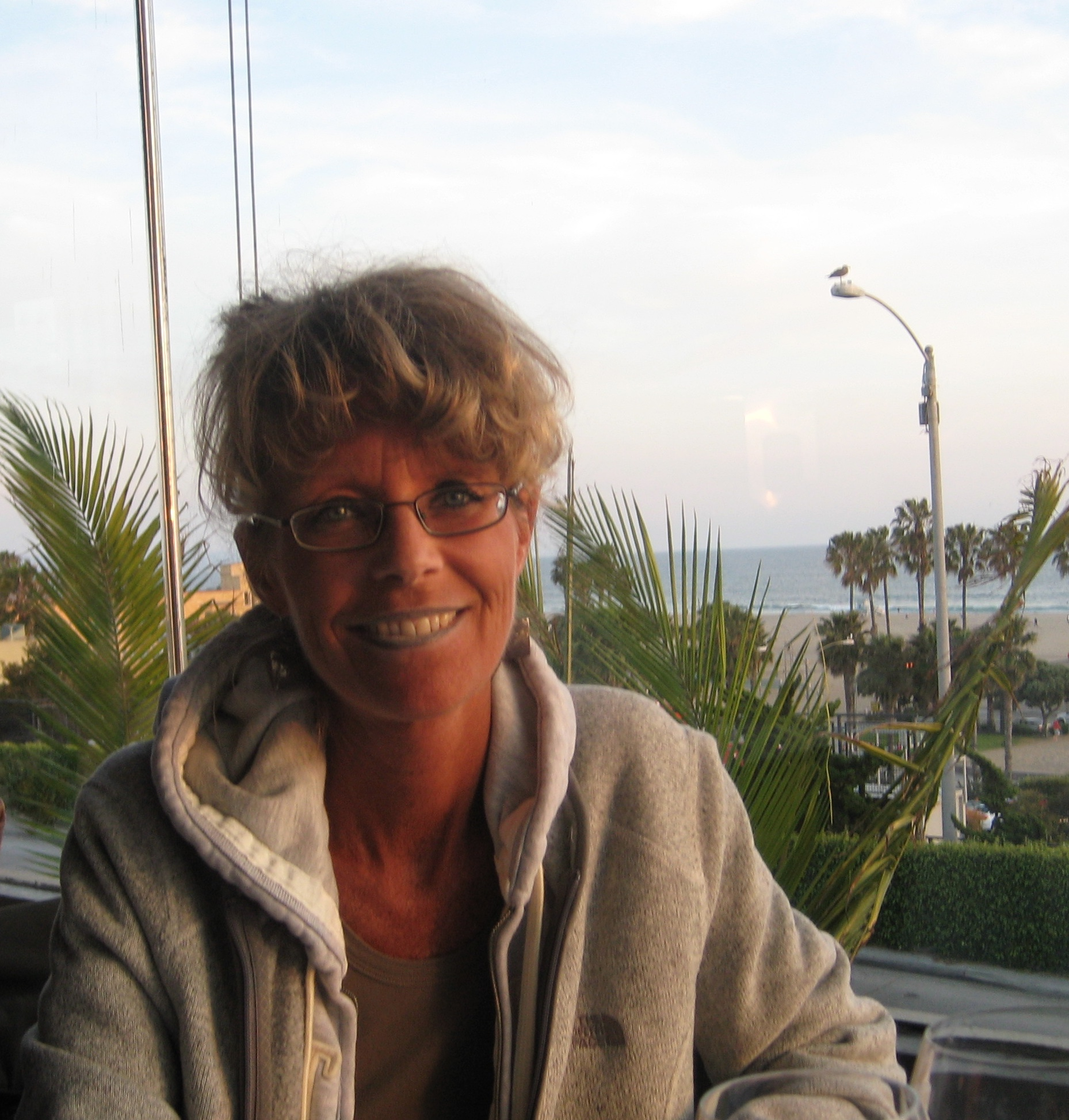
- Janne Blichert-Toft in 2012
- Born: Copenhagen, Denmark
- Education: University of Copenhagen
- Known for: application of hafnium isotopes to the evolution of the Earth and the early solar system
- Awards: Prix Etienne Roth of the French Académie des Sciences, and the Steno Medal of the Danish Geological Society.
- Scientific career
- Fields: Geochemistry
- Workplaces: École normale supérieure de Lyon

Janne Blichert-Toft is a geochemist, specializing in the use of isotopes with applications in understanding planetary mantle-crust evolution, as well as the chemical composition of matter in the universe. To further this research, Blichert-Toft has developed techniques for high-precision Isotope-ratio mass spectrometry measurements.

== Biography ==
- 1988 to 1991: Visiting scientist at the Lamont–Doherty Earth Observatory at Columbia University, as part of her degrees
- 1996: Visiting scientist at University of California at Berkeley
- 2000: Visiting professor at Harvard University
- 2003: Associate professor at Caltech

Subsequently, Blichert-Toft was at the Australian National University in 2004, at Cambridge University in 2005, at Tokyo University in 2006, and at the University of Chicago in 2011.

From 2008 to 2015, she was also adjunct faculty and Distinguished Wiess Visiting Scholar at Rice University.

=== Education ===
- 1990: M.Sc., University of Copenhagen
- 1993: Ph.D., Earth Sciences, University of Copenhagen
- 1996: École normale supérieure de Lyon, Marie-Curie Post-Doctoral Fellow
- 2000: Habilitation à Diriger des Recherches (HDR), Université Claude Bernard, Lyon I.

After her Marie-Curie post-doctorate, Blichert-Toft joined the CNRS in 1997 and became director of research in 2002 working at the École normale supérieure de Lyon.

=== Work ===
After her Marie-Curie Post-Doctorate, Blichert-Toft joined the Centre national de la recherche scientifique (CNRS) in 1997 and became director of research in 2002, working at the École normale supérieure de Lyon.

She pioneered the application of hafnium isotopes to the evolution of the Earth and the early solar system.

==== Publications ====
Blichert-Toft is currently on the Editorial Board of at least the following three publications:

- G-Cubed (Geochemistry, Geophysics, Geosystems) published by the American Geophysical Union
- Geochemical Perspectives published by the European Association of Geochemistry
- Geochimica et Cosmochimica Acta published by the Geochemical Society

From 2022–2024 she was the geochemistry principal editor of the scientific magazine "Elements", and previously served as associate editor for the Geochemical Society's newsletter "Geochemical News". The magazine "Elements" is jointly published by the Mineralogical Society of America, the Mineralogical Society of Great Britain and Ireland, the Mineralogical Association of Canada, the Geochemical Society, The Clay Minerals Society, the European Association of Geochemistry, the International Association of GeoChemistry, the Société Française de Minéralogie et de Cristallographie, the Association of Applied Geochemists, the Deutsche Mineralogische Gesellschaft, the Società Italiana di Mineralogia e Petrologia, the International Association of Geoanalysts, the Polskie Towarzystwo Mineralogiczne (Mineralogical Society of Poland), the Sociedad Española de Mineralogía (Spanish Mineralogical Society), the Swiss Geological Society, the Meteoritical Society, the Japan Association of Mineralogical Sciences and the International Association on the Genesis of Ore Deposits.

== Awards ==
- 2001: Bronze Medal, Centre national de la recherche scientifique (CNRS)
- 2005: Prix Etienne Roth du Commissariat à l'énergie atomique (CEA), Académie des Sciences
- 2010: Geochemistry Fellow of the Geochemical Society and the European Association of Geochemistry
- 2010: The Medal of the Ecole Normale Supérieure de Lyon
- 2012: Fellow of the American Geophysical Union
- 2012: Silver Medal, Centre national de la recherche scientifique (CNRS)
- 2015: The Danish Geological Society's Steno Medal
- 2015: Invited Plenary Speaker at the Goldschmidt Conference, Prague
- 2016: Member of the Royal Danish Academy of Sciences and Letters
- 2018: The Murchison Medal of the Geological Society of London
- 2022: The American Geophysical Union's Harry Hess Medal
- 2022: The BRGM Dolomieu Prize
