= Putnisite =

Carbonate-sulfate mineral

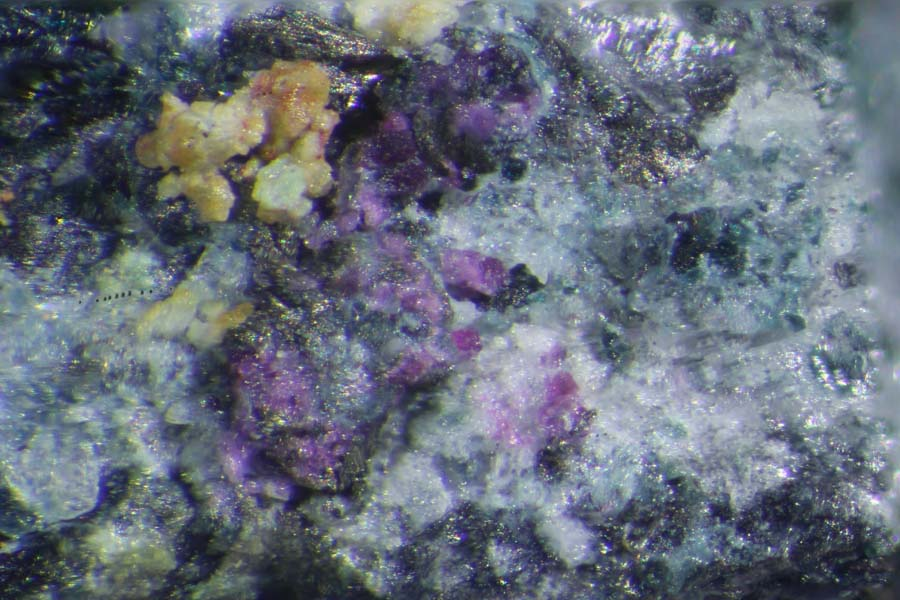
- Putnisite, from Polar Bear Peninsula, Western Australia, Australia

General
- Category: Minerals
- Formula: SrCa_{4}Cr_{8}^{3+}(CO_{3})_{8}(SO_{4})(OH)_{16}·25 H_{2}O
- IMA symbol: Pni
- Crystal system: Orthorhombic
- Crystal class: Dipyramidal (mmm); H-M symbol: (2/m 2/m 2/m)
- Space group: Pnma
- Unit cell: a = 15.351 Å, b = 20.421 Å, c = 18.270 Å; Z = 4

Identification
- Color: Purple
- Crystal habit: Pseudocubic crystals
- Cleavage: [100], [010] and [001] good
- Fracture: Brittle – uneven
- Mohs scale hardness: 1.5–2
- Luster: Vitreous
- Streak: Pink
- Diaphaneity: Translucent
- Specific gravity: 2.20
- Optical properties: Biaxial (−)
- Refractive index: n_{α} = 1.552, n_{β} = 1.583 and n_{γ} = 1.599
- Pleochroism: Distinct: X pale bluish grey, Y pale purple, Z pale purple

Putnisite (animation)

Putnisite is a mineral composed of strontium, calcium, chromium, sulfur, carbon, oxygen and hydrogen. It was discovered on the Polar Bear Peninsula in Shire of Dundas, Western Australia in 2007 during mining activity. Following identification and recognition by the IMA in 2012 the mineral was named after mineralogists Andrew and Christine Putnis. The formal description was published in 2014.

Putnisite has unique chemical and structural properties, and does not appear to be related to any of the existing mineralogical families. Crystals are translucent purple, but show distinct pleochroism (from pale purple to pale bluish grey, depending on the angle of observation) and leave pink streaks when rubbed on a flat surface.

Putnisite occurs as small (< 0.5 mm) cube-like crystals in volcanic rock. The mineral formed during the oxidation environment within komatiite to dioritic bodies containing sulfide minerals.
