= Dorsum Gast =

Wrinkle ridge on the Moon

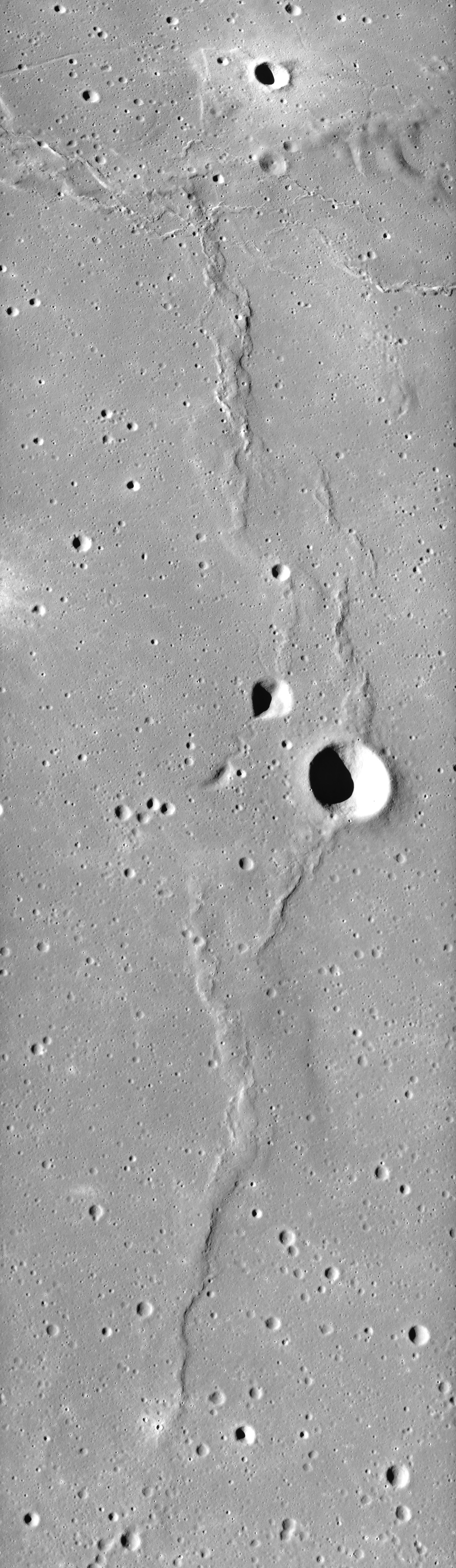
Apollo 15 image of Dorsum Gast, facing south

Dorsum Gast is a wrinkle ridge at 24.0°N 9.0°E in Mare Serenitatis on the Moon. It is 65 km long and was named after American geochemist and geologist Paul Werner Gast in 1973.
