= Department of Earth Sciences, University of Oxford =

Academic department of the University of Oxford

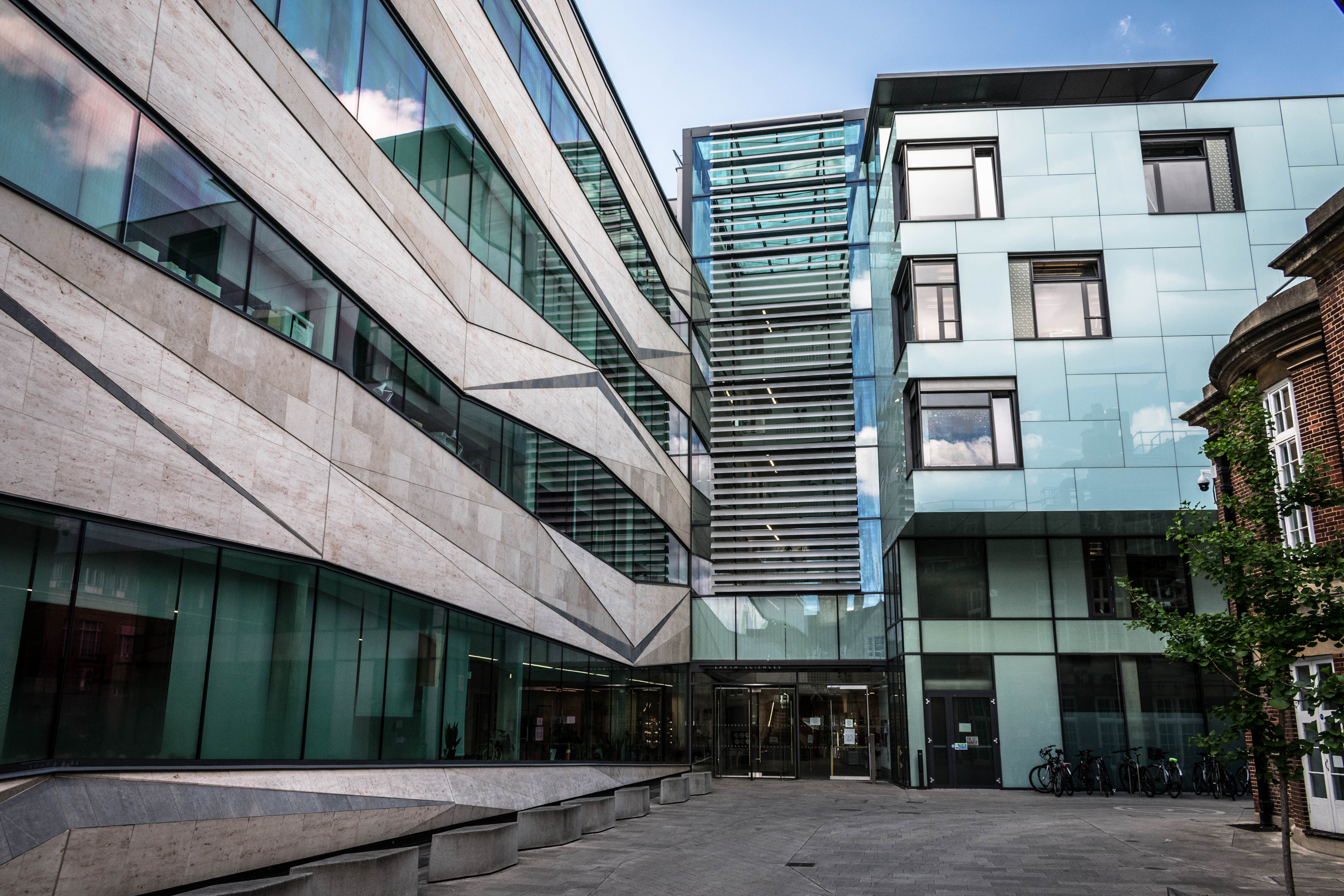
- The department seen from South Parks Road
- Established: 1888 (School of Geology)
- Affiliation: University of Oxford
- Head of Department: Conall Mac Niocaill
- Undergraduates: c. 120
- Postgraduates: c. 80
- Location: Oxford, United Kingdom; 51.7586°N 1.2544°W
- Website: earth.ox.ac.uk

The Department of Earth Sciences is an academic department at the Mathematical, Physical and Life Sciences Division at the University of Oxford in Oxford, England, United Kingdom. The department is based in the Earth Sciences building on South Parks Road in the Science Area.

== Overview ==
The department's research is broad but with an emphasis on geochemistry, geophysics, natural hazards and climate, and was the top-ranked department nationally in the 2014 REF assessment as well as ranking highly in international league tables. The department teaches an undergraduate degree in Earth sciences (leading to a 3-year BA in geology or 4-year MEarthSci in Earth sciences) with approximately 120 undergraduates, and entry is highly competitive. The course is interdisciplinary and quantitative, with a major research project in the fourth year. The department has 6 Multi-Collector Mass Spectrometers, 2 ICP Mass Spectrometers, specialised geochemistry, biogeochemistry and petrology laboratories including clean suites, a workshop for sample preparation and a library with c. 10,000 volumes (as well as map collections).

== History ==
Earth sciences at the University of Oxford dates back to the 17th century with the work of naturalists such as Edward Lhuyd and Robert Plot. However, the first formal appointment was in 1813, with William Buckland designated as reader in mineralogy, and later professor of geology. The establishment of the Oxford University Museum of Natural History in 1860 was influential in the history of geology at the university, and has collaborated closely with the Department of Earth Sciences (established as the School of Geology in 1888) ever since. The school was based in the museum until 1949, when it moved into a new building opposite Keble College (now occupied by the Department of Computer Science). The department moved again in 2010 to the building it occupies now.

== Notable people ==
- William Buckland
- Charles Lyell
- John Phillips (geologist)
- Nevil Story Maskelyne
- Joseph Prestwich
- Alexander Henry Green
- Henry Alexander Miers
- William Johnson Sollas
- William Joscelyn Arkell
- John Bowman
- Lawrence Wager
- John Frederick Dewey
- Keith O'Nions
- John Woodhouse (geophysicist)
- Don Fraser
- Philip England
- Alexander Halliday
- Bernie Wood
- Tony Watts
- Chris Ballentine
- Gideon Henderson
- John-Michael Kendall FRS
- Tamsin Mather
- Ros Rickaby
- William James Kennedy
