= Albrecht Hofmann =

German geochemist (born 1939)

Albrecht Werner Hofmann
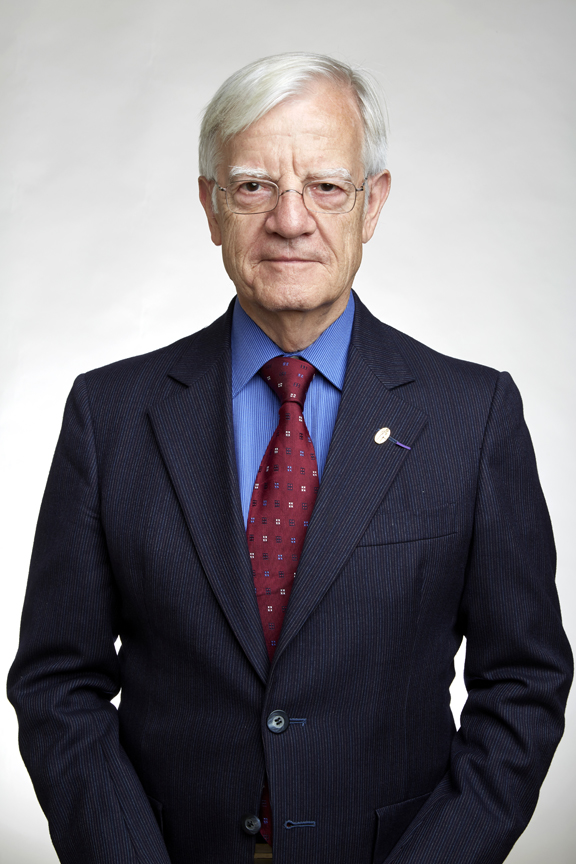
- Hofmann in 2018
- Born: ann 1939 (age 86–87); Germany
- Education: Brown University (PhD)
- Awards: Urey Medal (2015)
- Scientific career
- Workplaces: Carnegie Institution for Science; Max Planck Institute for Chemistry; Columbia University
- Thesis: Hydrothermal experiments on equilibrium partitioning and diffusion kinetics of Rb, Sr, and Na in biotite - alkali chloride solution systems (1969)
- Doctoral advisor: Bruno Giletti
- Website: www.mpic.de/en/research/biogeochemistry/biogeo/mitglieder/albrecht-hofmann/profile.html

Albrecht Werner Hofmann (born 1939) is a German geochemist who is emeritus professor at the Max Planck Institute for Chemistry and an adjunct professor at Columbia University. He is best known for his contributions to the field of geochemistry.

== Education ==
Hofmann studied geology and geochemistry in Freiburg in Germany, and completed his PhD degree at Brown University from 1962 - 1968. His thesis on hydrothermal experiments on partitioning and diffusion of alkali metals in biotite-alkali chloride solutions was awarded in 1969.

== Career and research ==
After working at the Carnegie Institution for Science in Washington, D.C. as a post-doctoral fellow (1971–1972) and then staff scientist (1972–1980), Al was appointed director at the Max Planck Institute for Chemistry, Mainz, Germany, in 1980, to lead the new Department of Geochemistry. He has been emeritus in Mainz and visiting senior research scientist at Lamont–Doherty Earth Observatory at Columbia University since 2007.

Hofmann uses trace elements and isotopic compositions of basalts to study the composition and evolution of Earth's mantle. He recognized "canonical" trace element ratios as tools to distinguish recycling processes of ancient oceanic and continental crust through the mantle and showed that the chemical heterogeneity of the mantle is dominated by recycled ocean crust.

=== Awards and honours ===
Among the awards he received are the Goldschmidt Medal of the Geochemical Society, the Hess Medal of the American Geophysical Union, and the Urey Medal of the European Association of Geochemistry. He has been a foreign associate of the National Academy of Sciences of the United States since 1999. He was elected a Foreign Member of the Royal Society in 2018.
