= John Woodhouse (geophysicist) =

John Henry Woodhouse FRS is an English geophysicist, Emeritus Professor in the Department of Earth Sciences at the University of Oxford .

He earned a Ph.D in 1975 in the Department of Applied Mathematics and Theoretical Physics at Cambridge University. After 2 years at Scripps and Cambridge, he joined the Harvard faculty in 1978 as an assistant professor. He was promoted to full professor 4 years later, returning to England in 1990 to take up the appointment as professor at Oxford University.

He has researched the variation of seismic wave speed in three dimensions inside the Earth, developing techniques to map the Earth’s interior. He discovered wave speed anomalies associated with plate motion and undertook the first global study of shear velocity in the lower mantle. He was elected a Fellow of the Royal Society in 2000.

In 2010 he was the recipient of the Gold Medal of the Royal Astronomical Society for geophysics. The medal honoured his lifetime of work understanding the Earth's interior, and in particular, his development of a computational algorithm which is now a standard tool in seismology.

He has also been the recipient of both the James B. Macelwane Medal (1984) and the Inge Lehmann Medal (2001) from the American Geophysical Union.
