= Alexander Halliday =

British geochemist and academic (born 1952)

Sir Alexander Halliday FRS
- Halliday in 2019
- Born: Penzance, Cornwall, England
- Education: Newcastle University
- Occupations: Founding Dean Emeritus, Columbia Climate School; Director, The Earth Institute at Columbia University

Sir Alexander Norman Halliday FRS (born 11 August 1952) is a British geochemist and academic who is the Founding Dean Emeritus of the Columbia Climate School, and Director of the Earth Institute at Columbia University. He joined the Earth Institute in April 2018, after spending more than a decade at the Department of Earth Sciences at the University of Oxford, during which time he was dean of science and engineering. He is also a professor of Earth and Environmental Sciences at Columbia University.

== Early life ==
Halliday was born in Penzance, Cornwall, in the UK. He went to school at the Humphry Davy Grammar School where he studied geology. He received his undergraduate degree and PhD degree in geology from Newcastle University in 1977.

== Career ==
Halliday was Professor of Geochemistry at the University of Oxford from 2004 to 2018. Before coming to Oxford, he spent twelve years as a professor at the University of Michigan and then six years in Switzerland, where he was Head of the Department of Earth Sciences at ETH Zurich. His research involves the use of isotopic methods to study Earth and planetary processes.

Halliday is a former president of the Geochemical Society; the European Association of Geochemistry; and the Volcanology, Geochemistry and Petrology Section of the American Geophysical Union. He has experience with a range of top science boards and advisory panels including those of the Natural Environment Research Council, HEFCE, the Natural History Museum, the Max Planck Society, the Royal Society and the American Geophysical Union. At Oxford he was Head of the Division of Mathematical, Physical and Life Sciences (science and engineering) from 2007 to 2015. In 2014, he was elected vice-president and Physical Secretary of the UK's Royal Society. He is currently a Fellow of the Royal Society and Foreign Associate of the US National Academy of Sciences.

== Research ==
Alex Halliday is an isotope geochemist known for novel mass spectrometry techniques and their applications to the Earth and planetary sciences. An enthusiast for technological innovation, most of Halliday's recent research is in developing and using new mass spectrometry techniques to shed light on the origin and early development of the Solar System and recent Earth processes, such as continental erosion and climate. However, he has also been engaged in other studies, such as the mechanisms of volcanic eruptions, and the formation of mineral and hydrocarbon deposits. He has collaborated with many others, for example, Bernard Wood. Halliday has over 400 published research papers.

== Accomplishments, awards and honours ==
Halliday's scientific accomplishments have been recognised with awards including the Murchison Medal of the Geological Society, the Bowen Award and Hess Medal of the American Geophysical Union, the Urey Medal of the European Association of Geochemistry and the Oxburgh Medal of the Institute of Measurement and Control. He was elected a Fellow of the Royal Society in 2000 and a Foreign Associate of the U.S. National Academy of Sciences in 2015. He was appointed a Knight Bachelor in the 2019 New Year Honours for services to Science and Innovation. He also is the recipient of an Honorary Degree from the University of St Andrews.
