= Todmorden High School =

Todmorden High School (formerly Scaitcliffe High School 1957–1978)

Location
- Ewood Lane; Todmorden, West Yorkshire, OL14 7DG; England
- Coordinates: 53.72086°N 2.11025°W

Information
- Type: Comprehensive school
- Motto: Enabling individuals to unlock their unique potential.
- Local authority: Calderdale
- Department for Education URN: 107564 Tables
- Ofsted: Reports
- Headteacher: Gill Shirt
- Senior Assistant Headteachers: Alice Coates and Emily Rawlinson
- Staff: 96
- Age: 11 to 16
- Enrolment: 798
- Website: http://www.todhigh.co.uk/

Todmorden High School is a comprehensive school in the town of Todmorden, Calderdale LEA, West Yorkshire, England.

== Admissions ==
Todmorden High School and Visual Arts College is located in the West Yorkshire town of Todmorden. It is a comprehensive school for 11- to 16-year-olds. Typically pupils at Todmorden High School transfer to the school from one of its seven feeder schools at the age of 11 or 12.

The school has approximately 820 pupils, and has 55 teaching staff members and 80 non-teaching staff members.

Upon entry, pupils are placed into mixed ability tutor groups and typically remain in those groups for five years. Form tutors usually stay with their form until graduation.

== Curriculum ==
The school teaches the full range of National Curriculum subjects at Key Stage 3 and a range of options at Key Stage 4. A special needs support system within each faculty helps pupils with learning difficulties.

The school offers extra-curricular activities.

== Notable alumni ==
=== Todmorden Grammar School ===
- Sir John Cockcroft CBE OM – nuclear physicist – Nobel Prize winner in 1951, President of the Institute of Physics from 1960 to 1962
- John Helliwell – musician, saxophonist and keyboardist for the English band Supertramp
- John Kettley – weather forecaster
- Robert Shackleton CBE, French language philologist
- Grenville Turner – nuclear physicist and Professor of Isotope Geochemistry at the University of Manchester from 1988 to 2002
- Prof Sir Geoffrey Wilkinson – chemist, the Sir Edward Frankland Professor of Inorganic Chemistry at the University of London from 1956 to 1988, winner of the Nobel Prize in Chemistry in 1973

=== Todmorden High School ===
- Megan Shackleton, para-table tennis player
- Persephone Swales-Dawson, actress
