= Étienne Roth =

French chemist (1922–2009)

- Eti
- Born: June 5, 1922; Strasbourg
- Died: March 19, 2009 (aged 86); Sèvres
- Citizenship: France
- Education: École Polytechnique
- Awards: Legion of Honour; Ordre des Palmes Académiques
- Scientific career
- Fields: Nuclear chemistry
- Workplaces: Atomic Energy and Alternative Energies Commission

Étienne Georges Alfred Roth (born 5 June 1922 in Strasbourg, died 19 March 2009 in Sèvres) was a French nuclear chemist, son of Professor George Roth and Marguerite Neymarck.

From 1980-87 Roth served as the Director of Research for the separations and isotopic studies of Physical Chemistry Division (1980–87) at the Atomic Energy and Alternative Energies Commission. During his scientific career he was a visiting Scientist at US Brookhaven National Laboratory (1957-1958), Chairman of the Atomic Weights Commission (1976-1979). In his career, Roth has authored more than one hundred and fifty scientific articles and several books on applied nuclear chemistry, and has invented several methods for industrial separation of isotopes.

The Prix Étienne Roth was established in his honour.
