= Keith O'Nions =

British scientist (born 1944)

Professor Sir Keith O'Nions FRS HonFREng
- Born: Robert Keith O'Nions; 26 September 1944 (age 81); Birmingham, England
- Education: University of Nottingham; University of Alberta
- Awards: Bigsby Medal (1983); Arthur Holmes Medal (1995); Lyell Medal (1995); Knight Bachelor (1999); Urey Medal (2001); HonFREng (2005)
- Scientific career
- Workplaces: University of Alberta; University of Oslo; University of Oxford; Imperial College London; Columbia University; University of Cambridge
- Thesis: Geochronology of the Bamble sector of the Baltic Shield, South Norway (1969)
- Doctoral advisor: Roger D. Morton
- Doctoral students: Carol D. Frost

Sir Robert Keith O'Nions (born 26 September 1944), is a British scientist and ex-President & Rector of Imperial College London. He is the former Director General of the Research Councils UK as well as Professor of the Physics and Chemistry of Minerals and Head of the Department of Earth Sciences at the University of Oxford.

== Early life ==
O'Nions attended Yardley Grammar School in Birmingham. He studied geology as an undergraduate at the University of Nottingham, and completed a PhD at the University of Alberta before taking up a postdoctoral position at the University of Oslo.

== Career ==
O'Nions taught geochemistry at the University of Oxford from 1971 to 1975, before moving to Columbia University as Professor of Geology. In 1979 when he was appointed Royal Society Research Professor at the University of Cambridge. He remained in Cambridge until 1995, when he returned to Oxford to take up the Professorship of Physics and Chemistry of Minerals.

He was Knighted in 1999, and from 2000 to 2004 he was Chief Scientific Adviser to the Ministry of Defence. After a period as Director-General of the Research Councils UK, he was appointed to lead the newly formed Institute for Security Science and Technology at Imperial College, London in July 2008.

On 1 January 2010, following the resignation of Sir Roy Anderson, he became acting Rector of Imperial College London, and in July 2010 he was appointed to a full term as Rector, to run until September 2014.`

== Honours and awards ==
Year	Honour awarded
1999	Knight Bachelor - Services to Earth Science (Birthday Honours)
2000	Honorary Fellow, University of Cardiff
2004	Honorary Doctor of Science, Herriot-Watt University
2005	Honorary Doctor of Science, University of Glasgow
2005	Honorary Doctor of Science, Royal Holloway
2005	Docteur Honoris Causa, University of Paris
2006	Honorary Doctor of Science, Loughborough University
2007	Honorary Doctor of Science, University of Alberta
2007	Honorary Doctor of Science, University of Edinburgh
2007	Honorary Doctor of Science, Abertay University
2009	Honorary Doctor of Science, University of Nottingham
2010	Honorary Doctor of Science, University of Birmingham
2018	Honorary Doctor of Science, Imperial College London
2019	Honorary Doctor of Letters, Nanyang Technological University

=== Awards ===
In 1979, O'Nions was awarded the James B Macelwane Award by the American Geophysical Union, followed in 1983 with the Bigsby Medal of the Geological Society of London. In 1985, O'Nions was named Hallimond Lecturer by the Mineralogical Society and in 1986, was named both UK-Canada Rutherford Lecturer by the Royal Society and William Smith Lecturer by the Geological Society of London.

O'Nions was further named Ingerson Lecturer by the Geological Society of America in 1990. In 1995 he was awarded the Arthur Holmes Medal by the European Union of Geosciences and the Lyell Medal by the Geological Society of London. In 1998, Australian National University named O'Nions as Jaeger-Hales Lecturer, while in 2001 he won the Urey Medal, presented by the European Association of Geochemistry. He was named Bruce Peller Prize Lecturer by the Royal Society of Edinburgh in 2004, and appointed as a HonFREng of the Royal Academy of Engineering in 2005. He is a member of the Norwegian Academy of Science and Letters.

In September 2017 he was appointed by Natural Environment Research Council as Chair of the new British Geological Survey board. O'Nions served on the Board of A*Star, Singapore from 2013 to 2021, was Chair of Cambridge Enterprise from 2014 to 2020 and is Chair of Council, University of Nottingham.

== Personal life ==
In 1967 he married Rita Bill with whom he has had three daughters.

Academic offices
Preceded by Roy Anderson	Rector of Imperial College London; 2010 – 2014	Succeeded by Alice Gast
