= Hugh P. Taylor Jr. =

American geochemist (1932–2021)

- Born: December 27, 1932; Holbrook, Arizona, US
- Died: October 26, 2021 (aged 88)
- Awards: Arthur L. Day Medal; Urey Medal

Academic background
- Education: California Institute of Technology; Harvard University
- Thesis: O^{18}/0^{16} Ratios in Coexisting Minerals of Igneous and Metamorphic Rocks
- Doctoral advisors: Samuel Epstein

Academic work
- Discipline: geology
- Sub-discipline: geochemistry
- Institutions: Pennsylvania State University; California Institute of Technology
- Main interests: isotope variations
- Notable works: Stable Isotopes in High Temperature Geological Processes

Hugh Pettingill Taylor Jr. (December 27, 1932, Holbrook, Arizona – October 26, 2021) was an American geochemist.

== Biography ==
Hugh P. Taylor Jr. and his (non-identical) twin brother lived in Arizona and New Mexico until 1943 when they moved with their parents to Los Angeles County, California. The family struggled financially. He and his brother attended South Gate High School. Their parents divorced in 1944. In 1949 Hugh P. Taylor Jr. scored the highest on a state-wide chemistry exam and won a scholarship from the American Chemical Society, enabling him to attend California Institute of Technology (Caltech). There he played varsity football, under head coach Bert LaBrucherie, and was inspired to study geology by a course taught by Professor Robert P. Sharp with the teaching assistants Clarence Allen and Leon Silver. Taylor graduated in 1954 with a B.S. in geochemistry. He was one of the first two graduating geochemistry majors in Caltech's history. From 1954 to 1955 Taylor was a graduate student at Harvard University, where he graduated with an M.S. in geology. In 1955 he returned to Caltech as a graduate student in geochemistry. He spent the summers of 1955 and 1956 working for the U.S. Steel Corporation to explore for iron ores in southeastern Alaska. His 1959 Ph.D. thesis O^{18}/0^{16} Ratios in Coexisting Minerals of Igneous and Metamorphic Rocks was supervised by Samuel Epstein. Taylor married his first wife in 1959.

Taylor had a temporary teaching position at Caltech until the end of 1960. From January 1961 until the summer of 1961 he held an appointment as an assistant professor at Pennsylvania State University. At Caltech he was an assistant professor from 1962 to 1964, an associate professor from 1964 to 1969, and a full professor 1969 to 2002, when he retired as professor emeritus. From 1981 he held an appointment as Robert P. Sharp Professor of Geology. From 1987 to 1994 Taylor served as Caltech's executive officer for geology.

Taylor was in the autumn semester of 1979 a Crosby Visiting professor at M.I.T. He was in the academic year 1980–1981 a geologist the U.S. Geological Survey in Saudi Arabia and in the academic year 1981–1982 a visiting professor at Stanford University (shortly after divorcing his first wife). He served as editor for Chemical Geology and as an associate editor for Geochimica et Cosmochimica Acta.

Taylor's Ph.D. research on oxygen isotopes formed the basis of much his scientific career over decades. He gained a reputation as a leading expert on stable isotopes in geochemistry. He studied rocks in terms of isotope variations of oxygen, hydrogen, carbon, silicon, and other elements. In the 1960s Epstein and Taylor did research on oxygen isotope variation in tektites. In the 1970s Epstein and Taylor analyzed isotopic compositions of samples of lunar rocks and minerals, returned from 6 Apollo missions — Apollo 11, 12, & 14 to 17. Epstein and Taylor also analyzed samples returned by Soviet Union's Luna 20 mission.

Taylor was the author or co-author of more than 150 scientific articles. He was a co-editor, with John W. Valley and James R. O'Neil, of the 1986 book Stable Isotopes in High Temperature Geological Processes. He did research with Bruno Turi on igneous rocks in Italy. Taylor and his colleagues did research on the interactions of the oceans with the underlying igneous crust, the hydrothermal circulation cells that form around intrusive igneous rocks, the geochemical origins of ore deposits (such as the Comstock Lode), and oxygen isotope analyses of minerals in stony meteorites.

In 1981 Taylor was elected a member of the National Academy of Sciences and also a fellow of the American Academy of Arts and Sciences. He was awarded in 1993 the Arthur L. Day Medal and in 1995 the Urey Medal. He delivered the 30th William Smith Lecture to the Geological Society of London.

== Selected publications ==
- Taylor, Hugh P.; Epstein, Samuel (1962). "Relationship Between O^{18}/O^{16} Ratios in Coexisting Minerals of Igneous and Metamorphic Rocks". Geological Society of America Bulletin. 73 (4): 461. doi:10.1130/0016-7606(1962)73[461:RBORIC]2.0.CO;2. ISSN 0016-7606.
- Taylor, Hugh P.; Frechen, Josef; Degens, Egon T. (1967). "Oxygen and carbon isotope studies of carbonatites from the Laacher See District, West Germany and the Alnö District, Sweden". Geochimica et Cosmochimica Acta. 31 (3): 407–430. Bibcode:1967GeCoA..31..407T. doi:10.1016/0016-7037(67)90051-8.
- Taylor, Hugh P. (1968). "The oxygen isotope geochemistry of igneous rocks". Contributions to Mineralogy and Petrology. 19 (1): 1–71. Bibcode:1968CoMP...19....1T. doi:10.1007/BF00371729. S2CID 133784169.
- Taylor, Hugh P.; Coleman, Robert G. (1968). "O^{18}/O^{16} Ratios of Coexisting Minerals in Glaucophane-Bearing Metamorphic Rocks". Geological Society of America Bulletin. 79 (12): 1727. doi:10.1130/0016-7606(1968)79[1727:OROCMI]2.0.CO;2. ISSN 0016-7606.
- Shieh, Y. N.; Taylor, H. P. (1969). "Oxygen and Carbon Isotope Studies of Contact Metamorphism of Carbonate Rocks". Journal of Petrology. 10 (2): 307–331. doi:10.1093/petrology/10.2.307.
- Sheppard, Simon M. F.; Nielsen, Richard L.; Taylor, Hugh P. (1971). "Hydrogen and oxygen isotope ratios in minerals from porphyry copper deposits". Economic Geology. 66 (4): 515–542. Bibcode:1971EcGeo..66..515S. doi:10.2113/gsecongeo.66.4.515.
- Sheppard, Simon M. F.; Taylor, H. P. (1974). "Hydrogen and Oxygen Isotope Evidence for the Origins of Water in the Boulder Batholith and the Butte Ore Deposits, Montana". Economic Geology. 69 (6): 926–946. Bibcode:1974EcGeo..69..926S. doi:10.2113/gsecongeo.69.6.926.
- Taylor, Hugh P. (1978). "Oxygen and hydrogen isotope studies of plutonic granitic rocks". Earth and Planetary Science Letters. 38 (1): 177–210. Bibcode:1978E&PSL..38..177T. doi:10.1016/0012-821X(78)90131-0.
- Taylor, H. P.; Forester, R. W. (1979). "An Oxygen and Hydrogen Isotope Study of the Skaergaard Intrusion and its Country Rocks: A Description of a 55 M.Y. Old Fossil Hydrothermal System". Journal of Petrology. 20 (3): 355–419. doi:10.1093/petrology/20.3.355.
- Criss, Robert E.; Taylor Jr., Hugh P. (1986). "Meteoric-hydrothermal systems". Reviews in Mineralogy. 16: 373–424.
- Gregory, Robert T.; Criss, Robert E.; Taylor, Hugh P. (1989). "Oxygen isotope exchange kinetics of mineral pairs in closed and open systems: Applications to problems of hydrothermal alteration of igneous rocks and Precambrian iron formations". Chemical Geology. 75 (1–2): 1–42. Bibcode:1989ChGeo..75....1G. doi:10.1016/0009-2541(89)90019-3.
- Dilles, John H.; Solomon, G. Cleve; Taylor, Hugh P.; Einaudi, Marco T. (1992). "Oxygen and hydrogen isotope characteristics of hydrothermal alteration at the Ann-Mason porphyry copper deposit, Yerington, Nevada". Economic Geology. 87 (1): 44–63. Bibcode:1992EcGeo..87...44D. doi:10.2113/gsecongeo.87.1.44.
- Norton, Denis; Taylor, H. P.; Bird, Dennis K. (1984). "The geometry and high-temperature brittle deformation of the Skaergaard Intrusion". Journal of Geophysical Research: Solid Earth. 89 (B12): 10178–10192. Bibcode:1984JGR....8910178N. doi:10.1029/JB089iB12p10178.
- Gunnarsson, Björn; Marsh, Bruce D.; Taylor, Hugh P. (1998). "Generation of Icelandic rhyolites: Silicic lavas from the Torfajökull central volcano". Journal of Volcanology and Geothermal Research. 83 (1–2): 1–45. Bibcode:1998JVGR...83....1G. doi:10.1016/S0377-0273(98)00017-1.
- Gregory, Robert T.; Criss, Robert E.; Taylor, Hugh P. (1989). "Oxygen isotope exchange kinetics of mineral pairs in closed and open systems: Applications to problems of hydrothermal alteration of igneous rocks and Precambrian iron formations". Chemical Geology. 75 (1–2): 1–42. Bibcode:1989ChGeo..75....1G. doi:10.1016/0009-2541(89)90019-3.
