= Experimental petrology =

Academic discipline

Experimental petrology is the field of research concerned with experimentally determining the physical and chemical behavior of rocks and their constituents. Because there is no way to directly observe or measure deep earth processes, geochemists rely on experimental petrology to establish quantitative values and relationships in order to construct models of the deep earth. Experimental petrology can range from creating artificial magmas to measure crystallization behavior to observing recrystallization of minerals at varying pressure/temperature conditions.

== Methodology ==
Although methodology varies from experiment to experiment, in general the procedure involves evaluating a synthetic rock or magma (created from a blend of oxides to replicate the chemistry of the rock/system in question) in an apparatus capable of creating and sustaining high pressures and temperatures such as a diamond anvil cell. In general, it is ideal if the enclosing capsule is relatively nonreactive, such as diamond or platinum/gold alloys.

== Experimental igneous petrology ==
Experimental igneous petrology is the subset of experimental petrology concerned with quantifying the behavior of magmas and their associated igneous rocks at depth. Standard procedure generally involves the creation of a synthetic magma (often corresponding to a real world analog) which is then cooled to a target temperature. After crystallization, the products are analyzed - qualities of interest include mineral assemblage (which minerals crystallized and how much), mineral chemistry, and liquid (the remainder of the synthetic magma base) composition.

=== Equilibrium crystallization ===
Equilibrium crystallization studies are those in which a starting liquid is cooled until fully crystalline. This is taken to be the "equilibrium state" of the composition under those particular P/T conditions. Criticisms of equilibrium crystallization include the observation that real-world systems are believed to rarely sit still during crystallization and thus would not be able to properly equilibrate.

=== Fractional crystallization ===
Fractional crystallization studies represent a fairly recent trend in experimental petrology, gaining popularity as a way to more accurately depict magma evolution in scenarios where a cumulate layer is built. In them, a starting liquid is cooled in small temperature steps (e.g. 30 °C). At each temperature step the contents are removed and analyzed as in equilibrium crystallization. Afterwards, a new liquid corresponding to the residual liquid from the previous step is synthesized, heated, and then subjected to another cooling step. The purpose of this stepwise approach is to examine how each new interval of crystallization affects the chemistry of the parent magma and, thus, the behavior of future crystallization steps. In such a manner it is possible to examine the behavior of a magma body as it slowly cools and crystallizes over time.

== See also ==
- Petrology
- Igneous petrology
- Cumulate rock
