= Paul Werner Gast =

Paul Werner Gast (September 11, 1930 – May 16, 1973) was an American geochemist and geologist.

He was born in Chicago to German immigrants and attended Wheaton College, Illinois, whence he graduated in 1952. He earned a Ph.D. from Columbia University in 1957. After graduation, he taught at the University of Minnesota until 1965 when he became professor of geology at Columbia.

In 1969 Paul Gast assumed leadership of the geo-science management of the Manned Spacecraft Center in preparation for Apollo mission sample return from the Moon. He served as chief scientist of the Apollo Lunar Science Staff. He was one of the science consultant group known unofficially as the "Four Horsemen," along with Jim Arnold, Bob Walker, and Gerry Wasserburg.

He died at the age of 43, being survived by his wife, Joyce Rinehart, and two sons and a daughter. During his career he pioneered the study of rare earth elements in examining the crust, mantle, and interior of the planet. He led the development of the use of rubidium-strontium and uranium-lead radiometric dating methods for rocks, particularly for samples returned from the Moon. His examinations of trace elements resulted in new understanding of how volcanic fluids originate.

== Awards and honors ==
- Geochemistry Fellow of the Geochemical Society.
- V. M. Goldschmidt Award of the Geochemical Society, 1972.
- James Furman Kemp medal, 1973.
- Space Science Award, 1973.
- Geochemical society named their Paul W. Gast Lecture Series after him.
- The publication "Trace Elements in Igneous Petrology" was published in his memory.
- Dorsum Gast, a wrinkle ridge on the Moon, is named after him.

== Works ==
- R. Kay; N. J. Hubbard; P. W. Gast (10 March 1970). "Chemical characteristics and origin of oceanic ridge volcanic rocks". Journal of Geophysical Research. 75 (8): 1585–1613. Bibcode:1970JGR....75.1585K. doi:10.1029/JB075I008P01585. ISSN 0148-0227. Wikidata Q57965870.
- Robert W. Kay; Paul W. Gast (November 1973). "The Rare Earth Content and Origin of Alkali-Rich Basalts". The Journal of Geology. 81 (6): 653–682. Bibcode:1973JG.....81..653K. doi:10.1086/627919. ISSN 0022-1376. Wikidata Q55980868.
- G.N. Hanson; P.W. Gast (January 1967). "Kinetic studies in contact metamorphic zones". Geochimica et Cosmochimica Acta. 31 (7): 1119–1153. Bibcode:1967GeCoA..31.1119H. doi:10.1016/S0016-7037(67)80053-X. ISSN 0016-7037. Wikidata Q96228754.
- Gast, P. W., "Isotopic Geochemistry", Columbia University.

He was also co-author of multiple papers on Geology.
