= European Association of Geochemistry =

The European Association of Geochemistry (EAG) is a pan-European organization founded to promotes geochemical research. The EAG organizes conferences, meetings and educational courses for geochemists in Europe, including the Goldschmidt Conference which it co-sponsors with the North American Geochemical Society.

== Awards ==
The European Association of Geochemistry gives the following awards:

- The Urey Medal (European Association of Geochemistry) for outstanding contributions advancing geochemistry over a career.
- The Science Innovation Award for an important and innovative breakthrough in geochemistry.
- The Houtermans Award for exceptional contributions to geochemistry made by scientists under 35 years old.
- Geochemical Fellows – Awarded annually by the Geochemical Society and the European Association of Geochemistry to outstanding scientists who have, over some years, made a major contribution to the field of geochemistry.

== Publications ==
The European Association of Geochemistry publishes, co-publishes, or sponsors the following:

- Geochemical Perspectives – 4 issues a year
- Geochemical Perspectives Letters – an open access journal
- Elements: An International Magazine of Mineralogy, Geochemistry, and Petrology – 6 issues a year
- Chemical Geology – 24 issues a year
