= Joanne Simpson Medal =

Annual award

The American Geophysical Union started the Joanne Simpson Medal in 2017. The award recognizes mid-career scientists for their contributions to Earth and space science.

== Medal recipients ==
The list of recipients is available at the American Geophysical Union. Source:

Year	Recipient
2018	Endawoke Yizengaw, Olivier Bachmann
2019	Fuqing Zhang, Ann Pearson, Penelope Lineton King
2020	Isabella Velicogna, Marie Edmonds, Asmeret Asefaw Berhe
2021	Anna Michalak, Jacob Bortnik, Jennifer Biddle
2022	Ankur R Desai, Yue Deng, Yafang Cheng
2023	Armin Sorooshian, Dalia Kirschbaum, Nandita Basu
2024	Jun Wang, Sasha Reed, Li Li
2025	Yoshihide Wada, Susan Natali, Elizabeth Cochran

== See also ==
- List of prizes named after people
