= Jayne Belnap =

American soil ecologist (born 1952)

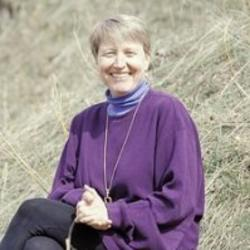
- Belnap in 2010
- Born: February 2, 1952 (age 74); Utah, United States
- Education: B.A. Biology, University of California, Santa Cruz; B.A. Natural History, University of California, Santa Cruz; M.S. Ecology, Stanford University; Ph.D (1991) Botany, Brigham Young University

Jayne Belnap (born February 2, 1952) is an American soil ecologist. Her expertise lies in desert ecologies and grassland ecosystems.

In 2008, she was recognised by the Ecological Society of America as one of the most outstanding ecologists in the United States. In 2010 and 2013, she received awards from the United States Department of Interior as one of the most outstanding women in science. In 2015, she was elected as a fellow of the Ecological Society of America.

== Biography ==
Belnap completed two undergraduate degrees (in biology and natural history) at the University of California, Santa Cruz in 1980; a master's in ecology from Stanford University in 1983; and a PhD in botany from Brigham Young University in 1991. After completing her undergraduate and master's degrees, she became a seasonal botanist at Canyonlands National Park. In 1987, she joined the United States Department of Interior as a scientist. Belnap now works as a research ecologist for the United States Geological Survey in the Moab field office.

Belnap has published over 260 peer-reviewed articles, and her research has been highlighted in Scientific American. In 2003, Belnap and Otto L. Lange co-edited the first book to summarise knowledge about biological soils crusts. Her work has taken her all over the world, including Australia, Antarctica, China, Ethiopia, Iceland, Kenya, Mongolia, Namibia, South Africa, Tanzania, the United Arab Emirates and Zimbabwe. In the United States, Belnap has worked with federal, state and private land managers on best management practices for drylands. Much of her research has also highlighted how climate change will affect drylands ecosystems.

== Selected works ==
- Duniway, M. C., Geiger, E. L., Minnick, T. J., Phillips, S. L., & Belnap, J. (2018). Insights from Long-Term Ungrazed and Grazed Watersheds in a Salt Desert Colorado Plateau Ecosystem. Rangeland Ecology & Management, 71(4), 492–505. https://doi.org/10.1016/j.rama.2018.02.007
- Duniway, M. C., Pfennigwerth, A. A., Fick, S. E., Nauman, T. W., Belnap, J., & Barger, N. N. (2019). Wind erosion and dust from US drylands: a review of causes, consequences, and solutions in a changing world. Ecosphere, 10(3), e02650. https://doi.org/10.1002/ecs2.2650
- Eldridge, David, Sasha Reed, Samantha K. Travers, Matthew A. Bowker, Fernando T. Maestre, Jingyi Ding, Caroline Havrilla, Emilio Rodriguez‐Caballero, Nichole Barger, Bettina Weber, Anita Antoninka, Jayne Belnap, Bala Chaudhary, Akasha Faist, Scott Ferrenberg, Elisabeth Huber‐Sannwald, Oumarou Malam Issa, and Yunge Zhao. The pervasive and multifaceted influence of biocrusts on water in the world's drylands. https://doi.org/10.1111/gcb.15232
- Havrilla, Caroline, Chaudhary, V., Scott Ferrenberg, Anita Antoninka, Jayne Belnap, Matthew A. Bowker, David Eldridge, Akasha Faist, Elisabeth Huber-Sannwald, AD Leslie, Emilio Rodriguez-Caballero, Y Zhang, and Nichole Barger. Towards a predictive framework for biocrust mediation of plant performance: A meta‐analysis. J Ecol. 2019; 107: 2789– 2807. https://doi.org/10.1111/1365-2745.13269
- Munson, S. M., Duniway, M. C., & Johanson, J. K. (2016). Rangeland Monitoring Reveals Long-term Plant Responses to Precipitation and Grazing at the Landscape Scale. Rangeland Ecology & Management, 69(1), 76–83. https://doi.org/10.1016/j.rama.2015.09.004

== Awards ==
- Fellow, Ecological Society of America (2015)
- Fellow, American Geophysical Union (2019)
