= Klaus Müllen =

German chemist

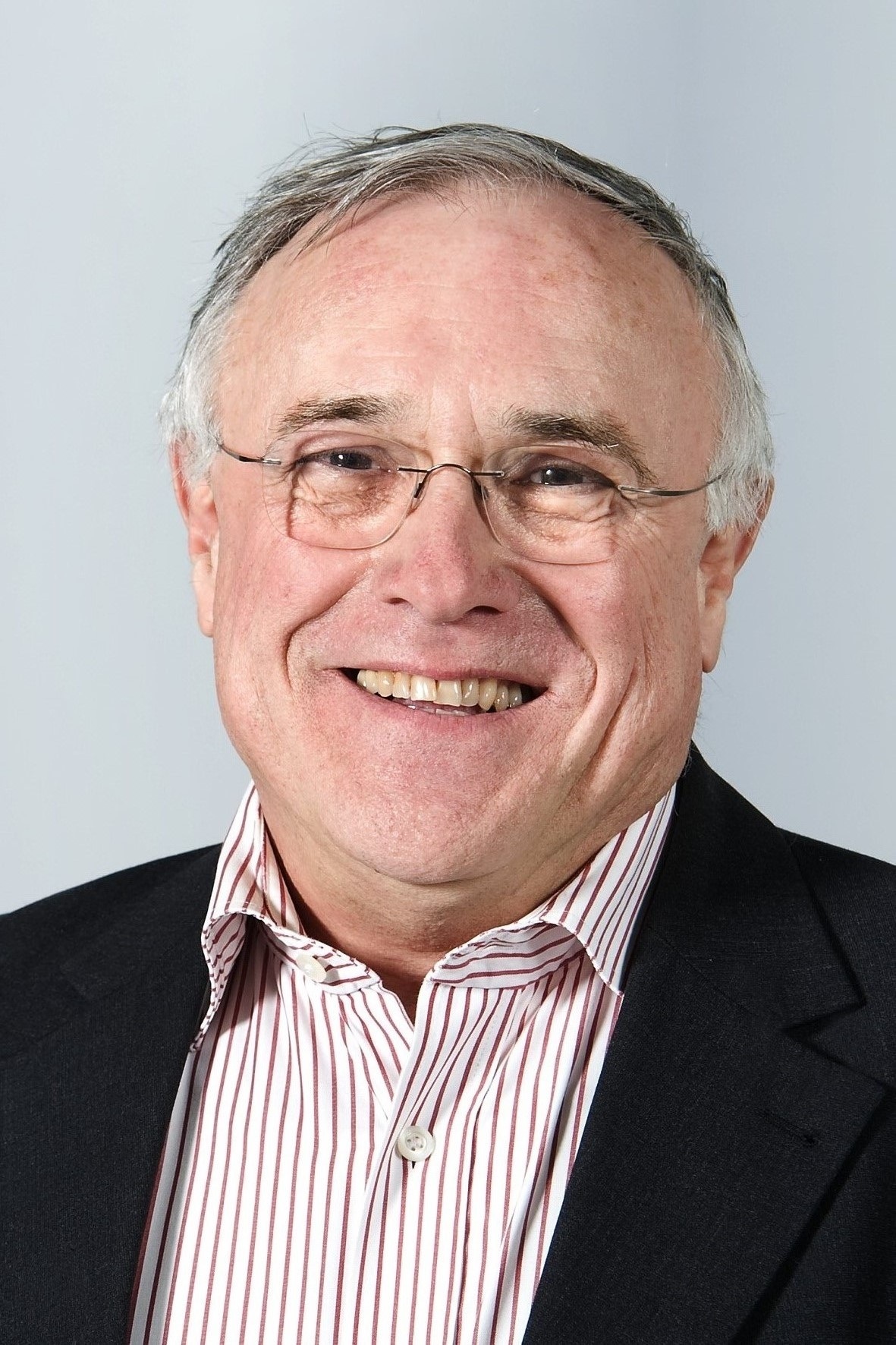
- Born: 2 January 1947 (age 79); Cologne, Germany
- Education: University of Cologne; University of Basel
- Scientific career
- Fields: polymer chemistry supramolecular chemistry nanotechnology
- Workplaces: University of Mainz; Max Planck Institute for Polymer Research
- Thesis: Nuclear resonance and electron spin resonance spectroscopic studies on bridged annulenes
- Doctoral advisor: Fabian Gerson
- Other academic advisors: Jean François Michael Oth
- Doctoral students: Eva Harth; Tanja Weil; Wojciech Pisula

Klaus Müllen (born 2 January 1947) is a German chemist working in the fields of polymer chemistry, supramolecular chemistry and nanotechnology. He is known for the synthesis and exploration of the properties of graphene-like nanostructures and their potential applications in organic electronics.

== Early life and education ==
Müllen was born in Cologne. He studied chemistry there and was awarded a PhD in 1971 under the supervision of Fabian Gerson at the University of Basel. He specialized in electron spin resonance (ESR) spectroscopy and his dissertation was on nuclear resonance and electron spin resonance spectroscopic studies on bridged annulenes. He completed post-doctoral studies at the ETH Zurich under Jean François Michel Oth (1926–2003) and received his habilitation in 1977 with a thesis on dynamic NMR spectroscopy and electrochemistry.

== Research career ==
In 1979, he became professor of organic chemistry at the University of Cologne, and in 1983, he went to the University of Mainz as a professor. Since 1989, he has been director and scientific member of the Max Planck Institute for Polymer Research. In 2016, he became emeritus. Since 1995, he has been honorary professor at the University of Mainz and at the Gutenberg Research College of the University of Mainz.

His research interests are in the field of preparative macro- and supramolecular chemistry. Among other things, his group has succeeded in synthesizing and characterizing hitherto unattainable large polycyclic aromatics such as superphenalene, which has a molecular mass of 1182 g·mol^{−1} and consists of 34 condensed benzene rings.

Structure of superphenalene

He has developed small disc-like organic building blocks using alkyl-substituted hexabenzocoronene, and in particular HBC-C12 – which self-assembles into crystalline liquid-phase structures (columnar liquid crystals) as potential organic field-effect transistors. The considered two-dimensional benzene ring structures are examples of subunits of graphene lattices (graphene nanostructures). The graphene-like structures synthesized and investigated by Müllen include two-dimensional bands of less than 50 nanometers width with jagged edges. Of interest here are the electronic conduction properties and spintronics properties with a view to future replacement of silicon-semiconductor technology. In synthesis, he introduced a new method in graphene polymer chemistry: soft-landing mass spectrometry. Applications include synthetic light-emitting organic materials (such as OLEDs) and incorporation of molecular defects (defect engineering) organic analogues of semiconductor technology.

== Selected awards and honorary posts ==
- 2001: Honorary Doctorate, University of Sofia
- 2010: Honorary Doctorate, Karlsruhe Institute of Technology
- 2013: Member of the American Academy of Arts and Sciences
- 2016: Honorary Professor, Beijing University of Chemical Technology
- 2017: Member of the Academia Europaea
- 2017: Hamburger Wissenschaftspreis (shared with Xinliang Feng)
- 2023: Member of Chinese Academy of Sciences

== Selected publications ==
Books

- K. Müllen: Kernresonanz- und elektronenspinresonanzspektroskopische Untersuchungen an überbrückten Annulenen, Dissertation, Basel 1971
- Müllen, K.; Wegner, Gerhard (1998). Electronic materials : the oligomer approach. Weinheim: Wiley-VCH. ISBN 978-3-527-61205-5. OCLC 311137129.
- Müllen, K.; Scherf, Ullrich (2006). Organic light emitting devices : synthesis, properties and applications. Weinheim: Wiley-VCH. ISBN 3-527-31218-8. OCLC 85821117.
- Müllen, K. (2025). Die Chemie muss stimmen [The Chemistry Got to Be Right] (in German). Berlin: GNT-Verlag. doi:10.47261/1572. ISBN 978-3-86225-139-1. OCLC 1521257121. e-book: ISBN 978-3-86225-572-6 (autobiography)

Articles

- Müllen, Klaus (11 July 2014). "Evolution of Graphene Molecules: Structural and Functional Complexity as Driving Forces behind Nanoscience". ACS Nano. 8 (7). American Chemical Society (ACS): 6531–6541. doi:10.1021/nn503283d. hdl:11858/00-001M-0000-0023-C371-6. ISSN 1936-0851. PMID 25012545.
- Müllen, Klaus (27 January 2016). "Molecular defects in organic materials". Nature Reviews Materials. 1 (2) 15013. Springer Science and Business Media LLC. Bibcode:2016NatRM...115013M. doi:10.1038/natrevmats.2015.13. ISSN 2058-8437. S2CID 136209961.
- De Luca, Giovanna; Pisula, Wojciech; Credgington, Dan; Treossi, Emanuele; Fenwick, Oliver; Lazzerini, Giovanni Mattia; Dabirian, Reza; Orgiu, Emanuele; Liscio, Andrea; Palermo, Vincenzo; Müllen, Klaus; Cacialli, Franco; Samorì, Paolo (4 April 2011). "Organic Electronics: Non-conventional Processing and Post-processing Methods for the Nanostructuring of Conjugated Materials for Organic Electronics (Adv. Funct. Mater. 7/2011)". Advanced Functional Materials. 21 (7). Wiley: 1206. doi:10.1002/adfm.201190017. ISSN 1616-301X.
- Wu, Jishan; Pisula, Wojciech; Müllen, Klaus (10 February 2007). "Graphenes as Potential Material for Electronics". Chemical Reviews. 107 (3). American Chemical Society (ACS): 718–747. doi:10.1021/cr068010r. ISSN 0009-2665. PMID 17291049.
- Wang, Xuan; Zhi, Linjie; Müllen, Klaus (11 December 2007). "Transparent, Conductive Graphene Electrodes for Dye-Sensitized Solar Cells". Nano Letters. 8 (1). American Chemical Society (ACS): 323–327. doi:10.1021/nl072838r. ISSN 1530-6984. PMID 18069877.
- Cai, Jinming; Ruffieux, Pascal; Jaafar, Rached; Bieri, Marco; Braun, Thomas; Blankenburg, Stephan; Muoth, Matthias; Seitsonen, Ari P.; Saleh, Moussa; Feng, Xinliang; Müllen, Klaus; Fasel, Roman (2010). "Atomically precise bottom-up fabrication of graphene nanoribbons". Nature. 466 (7305). Springer Science and Business Media LLC: 470–473. Bibcode:2010Natur.466..470C. doi:10.1038/nature09211. ISSN 0028-0836. PMID 20651687. S2CID 4422290.
- Wu, Zhong-Shuai; Yang, Shubin; Sun, Yi; Parvez, Khaled; Feng, Xinliang; Müllen, Klaus (29 May 2012). "3D Nitrogen-Doped Graphene Aerogel-Supported Fe3O4 Nanoparticles as Efficient Electrocatalysts for the Oxygen Reduction Reaction". Journal of the American Chemical Society. 134 (22). American Chemical Society (ACS): 9082–9085. Bibcode:2012JAChS.134.9082W. doi:10.1021/ja3030565. ISSN 0002-7863. PMID 22624986.
- Kinkhabwala, Anika; Yu, Zongfu; Fan, Shanhui; Avlasevich, Yuri; Müllen, Klaus; Moerner, W. E. (18 October 2009). "Large single-molecule fluorescence enhancements produced by a bowtie nanoantenna". Nature Photonics. 3 (11). Springer Science and Business Media LLC: 654–657. Bibcode:2009NaPho...3..654K. doi:10.1038/nphoton.2009.187. ISSN 1749-4885.
- Watson, Mark D.; Fechtenkötter, Andreas; Müllen, Klaus (20 April 2001). "Big Is Beautiful−"Aromaticity" Revisited from the Viewpoint of Macromolecular and Supramolecular Benzene Chemistry". Chemical Reviews. 101 (5). American Chemical Society (ACS): 1267–1300. doi:10.1021/cr990322p. ISSN 0009-2665. PMID 11710221.
- Liu, Ruili; Wu, Dongqing; Feng, Xinliang; Müllen, Klaus (29 March 2010). "Nitrogen-Doped Ordered Mesoporous Graphitic Arrays with High Electrocatalytic Activity for Oxygen Reduction". Angewandte Chemie International Edition. 49 (14). Wiley: 2565–2569. Bibcode:2010ACIE...49.2565L. doi:10.1002/anie.200907289. ISSN 1433-7851. PMID 20217877.
