= Hämmerling =

Hammerling or Hämmerling is a surname. Notable people with the surname include:

- Dorit Hammerling, Austrian and American environmental statistician and environmental engineer
- Frieda Hämmerling (born 1997), German rower
- Gisela Hämmerling (born 1969), Swiss judoka
- Joachim Hämmerling (1901–1990), Danish-German biologist
