= Eva Harth =

Polymer researcher and chemistry PhD

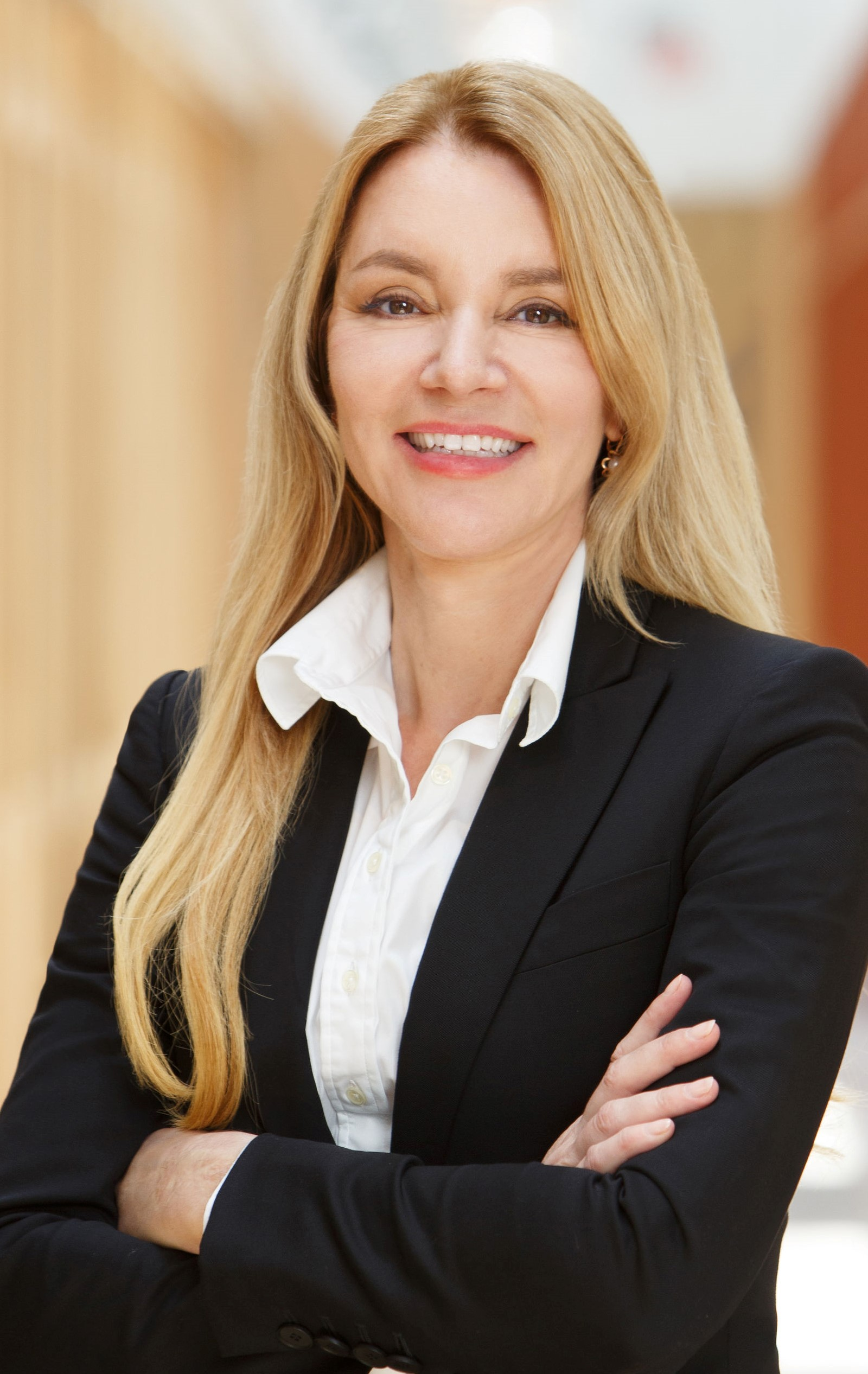
- Born: 1968
- Education: University of Bonn; University of Zurich; University of Mainz; Max Planck Institute for Polymer Research
- Occupations: Chemist; professor
- Scientific career
- Workplaces: IBM Research – Almaden; Vanderbilt University; University of Houston

Eva M. Harth FRSC is a German-American polymer scientist and researcher, and a fellow of both the Royal Society of Chemistry and the American Chemical Society. She is a full professor at the University of Houston and director of the Welch Center for Excellence in Polymer Chemistry.

== Education ==
She received her undergraduate degree from the University of Bonn (BS) and her graduate degrees at the University of Zurich (MS) and the Max Planck Institute for Polymer Research (PhD). Under the guidance of Klaus Müllen, Harth completed her PhD on fullerene-based polymers with her thesis, Synthesis and properties of new fullerene adducts and fullerene-containing polymers, in 1998.

== Career and research ==
=== Early career ===
Eva Harth moved to the United States as a National Science Foundation postdoctoral fellow to the IBM Almaden Research Center. She worked with chemist Craig Hawker on polymeric nanoparticles and nitroxide polymerization for two years and then moved to a start-up company, XenoPort, Inc.

=== Vanderbilt University ===
In 2004, she started at Vanderbilt University as an assistant professor, was promoted to associate professor in 2011, and served three years as director and DGS of the Interdisciplinary Materials Science Graduate Program (IMS).

During her time at Vanderbilt, she developed a nanosponge delivery system that is licensed by a start-up company. The biodegradable nanoparticle, composed of crosslinked polyester, contains tiny cavities that can store drug molecules. The nanoparticle breaks down in the body, releasing the drug in a predictable fashion, and can be further functionalized with a targeting peptide to favor drug delivery to cancerous cells.

=== University of Houston ===
Harth moved to the University of Houston as a full professor in 2017, where her research expanded into the area of metal-organic chemistry. In 2018, the group developed the metal-insertion light-initiated radical (MILRad) polymerization.

Her current research group focuses on incorporating functional groups into polyolefins, combining polymerization methodologies to design novel polymer structures containing polyolefins. The group has a long-standing interest in biomedical materials and technologies to increase the therapeutic function of synthetic and biological substances.

In 2022, the group developed Polyolefin Active Ester Exchange (PACE) process to give access to polyolefin block copolymers containing vinylic, acrylic and polyester and polyamide segments.

== Editorial and advisory work ==
In 2017, Harth received a Gutenberg Chair Award from the University of Strasbourg and was admitted as a Fellow of the Royal Society of Chemistry. From 2009–2018, she served as an associate editor for Polymer Chemistry, a journal of the RSC.

She is a member of the advisory board of Polymer Chemistry and is an associate editor of the European Polymer Journal.

== Awards and honors ==
- 2007 NSF Career Award
- 2017 Gutenberg Chair
- 2017 Fellow of the Royal Society of Chemistry
- 2021 Fellow of the American Chemical Society
- 2025 Fellow of the National Academy of Inventors
