= Gerald Haug =

German geologic climatologist

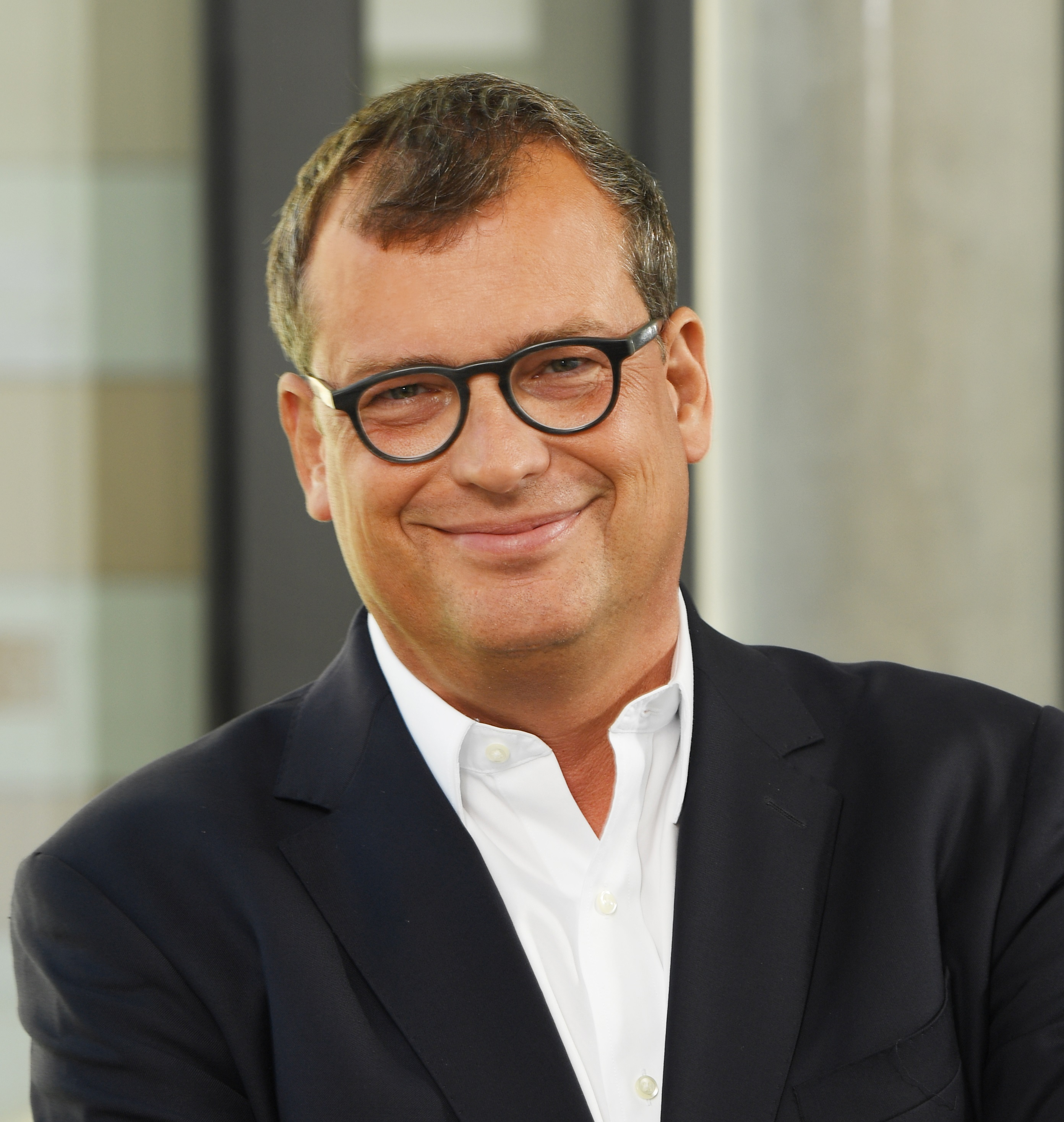
- Photo by Carsten Costard for Max-Planck-Institut für Chemie.
- Education: University of Karlsruhe
- Awards: Gottfried Wilhelm Leibniz Prize
- Scientific career
- Fields: Geology, Climatology
- Workplaces: ETH Zürich
- Doctoral students: Nele Meckler

Gerald H. Haug (born 14 April 1968 in Karlsruhe, Germany) is a German geologic climatologist, prize winner of the Gottfried Wilhelm Leibniz Prize and since 2007 he has a professorship at the ETH Zürich in Switzerland. In 2015 he became director of the Climate Geochemistry Department and Scientific Member at the Max Planck Institute for Chemistry in Mainz and since March 2020, he became the new President of the National Academy of Sciences Leopoldina.

== Early life and education ==
Haug graduated in Geology at the Karlsruhe Institute of Technology (KIT) in 1992 and received his PhD at the University of Kiel, Germany, in 1995.

== Career ==
From 1995 to 1996 Haug worked as a postdoc at GEOMAR, Helmholtz Center for Ocean Research Kiel, Germany. From 1996 to 1997 he had been a postdoctoral fellow in the Department of Oceanography at the University of British Columbia, Vancouver, Canada. Subsequently, he worked as a postdoctoral student at the Woods Hole Oceanographic Institution in Massachusetts, United States, and became later a research assistant professor at the University of Southern California, Los Angeles, United States (1997–1998). From 2000 to 2002, he worked as a senior assistant at the ETH Zürich, Switzerland, and habilitated in the Earth Sciences (2002).

Haug is signee of a protest note which points out the dangers arising from ignoring climate change.

Haug initiated the construction of the research sail yacht S/Y Eugen Seibold and coordinates the research.

== Other activities ==
- Virchow Prize for Global Health, Member of the Prize Committee (since 2022)
- German Future Prize, Member of the Board of Trustees (since 2020)
- Academy of Sciences and Literature, Member (since 2018)
- Academia Europaea, Member (since 2008)
- Alfred Wegener Institute for Polar and Marine Research, Member of the Board of Governors
- Karlsruhe Institute of Technology (KIT), Member of the Supervisory Board
- Max Planck Institute of Microstructure Physics, Member of the Board of Trustees
- Max Planck Institute for Polymer Research, Member of the Board of Trustees
- Potsdam Institute for Climate Impact Research (PIK), Chair of the Scientific Advisory Board
- Werner Siemens Foundation, Member of the Advisory Council

== Awards and honors ==
- 2001: Albert Maucher-Preis of the Deutsche Forschungsgemeinschaft (DFG)
- 2007: Gottfried Wilhelm Leibniz Prize of the DFG
- 2010: Rössler Prize

== Selected publications ==
- Haug, Gerald H.; Tiedemann, Ralf (1998). "Effect of the formation of the Isthmus of Panama on Atlantic Ocean thermohaline circulation". Nature. 393 (6686). Springer Science and Business Media LLC: 673–676. Bibcode:1998Natur.393..673H. doi:10.1038/31447. ISSN 0028-0836. S2CID 4421505.
- Haug, Gerald H.; Sigman, Daniel M.; Tiedemann, Ralf; Pedersen, Thomas F.; Sarnthein, Michael (1999). "Onset of permanent stratification in the subarctic Pacific Ocean". Nature. 401 (6755). Springer Science and Business Media LLC: 779–782. Bibcode:1999Natur.401..779H. doi:10.1038/44550. ISSN 0028-0836. S2CID 4413377.
- Haug, Gerald H.; Tiedemann, Ralf; Zahn, Rainer; Ravelo, A. Christina (2001). "Role of Panama uplift on oceanic freshwater balance". Geology. 29 (3). Geological Society of America: 207. Bibcode:2001Geo....29..207H. doi:10.1130/0091-7613(2001)029<0207:ropuoo>2.0.co;2. ISSN 0091-7613.
- Haug, Gerald H.; Hughen, Konrad A.; Sigman, Daniel M.; Peterson, Larry C.; Röhl, Ursula (17 August 2001). "Southward Migration of the Intertropical Convergence Zone Through the Holocene". Science. 293 (5533). American Association for the Advancement of Science (AAAS): 1304–1308. Bibcode:2001Sci...293.1304H. doi:10.1126/science.1059725. ISSN 0036-8075. PMID 11509727. S2CID 24591761.
- with Daniel M. Sigman: The biological pump in the past. In: Henry Elderfield (Hrsg.): Treatise on Geochemistry. Volume 6: The Oceans and Marine Geochemistry. Elsevier, 2003, ISBN 0-08-043744-3 (PDF)
- Haug, Gerald H.; Günther, Detlef; Peterson, Larry C.; Sigman, Daniel M.; Hughen, Konrad A.; Aeschlimann, Beat (14 March 2003). "Climate and the Collapse of Maya Civilization". Science. 299 (5613). American Association for the Advancement of Science (AAAS): 1731–1735. Bibcode:2003Sci...299.1731H. doi:10.1126/science.1080444. ISSN 0036-8075. PMID 12637744. S2CID 128596188.
- Haug, Gerald H.; Ganopolski, Andrey; Sigman, Daniel M.; Rosell-Mele, Antoni; Swann, George E. A.; Tiedemann, Ralf; Jaccard, Samuel L.; Bollmann, Jörg; Maslin, Mark A.; Leng, Melanie J.; Eglinton, Geoffrey (2005). "North Pacific seasonality and the glaciation of North America 2.7 million years ago". Nature. 433 (7028). Springer Science and Business Media LLC: 821–825. Bibcode:2005Natur.433..821H. doi:10.1038/nature03332. ISSN 0028-0836. PMID 15729332. S2CID 24116155.
