= Wojciech Pisula =

Polish physicist and academic

- Occupation: Academic teacher
- Title: Professor of Natural Sciences

Academic background
- Education: Alma mater: University of Wales Ph.D.: 2005 – Chemical Sciences, Max Planck Institute for Polymer Research Habilitation: 2015 – Materials Science, Technical University of Darmstadt Professorship: 2020

Academic work
- Discipline: Chemistry
- Institutions: Łódź University of Technology

Wojciech Pisula is a Polish professor and habilitated doctor of chemical sciences specializing in the study of supramolecular structures of self-assembling systems and their applications in electronic devices. He is affiliated with the Department of Molecular Physics at the Faculty of Chemistry, Łódź University of Technology.

== Education ==
Pisula graduated in chemical engineering from the University of Wales. In 2005, he obtained a Ph.D. in Chemical Sciences at the Max Planck Institute for Polymer Research in Mainz, where he conducted research in the group of Klaus Müllen. After earning his doctorate, he continued working in the same group as a guest scientist and project leader. In 2015, he obtained his habilitation in Materials Science from the Technical University of Darmstadt.

== Scientific activity ==
Since 2015, he has been affiliated with Łódź University of Technology as an associate professor, and since 2020 as a Full Professor in the Department of Molecular Physics at the Faculty of Chemistry. His research focuses on supramolecular structures of self-assembling systems and their potential applications in electronic devices. As part of his research activities, he has led projects funded by the National Science Centre, including the OPUS project “Organic Semiconductors in Stretchable Electronics” and the SONATA BIS project “Role of self-assembly and microstructure on the electronic behavior under bending strain of conjugeted semiconducting systems in thin films”.

He is the author or co-author of more than 240 scientific publications published in journals such as Nature Materials, Nature Communications, Advanced Materials, Journal of the American Chemical Society, and Angewandte Chemie.

His main research interests include supramolecular structures of self-assembling systems, molecular organization of functional materials, applications of organic materials in electronic devices, and the properties of thin films of organic semiconductors.

Since 2016, he has served as an editor of the journal Synthetic Metals, and since 2020 he has been editor-in-chief of Electronic Materials.

Alongside his academic work, he began working for Evonik Industries in 2006.
