= Max Planck Institute for Chemistry =

Research institute in Mainz, Germany

Coordinates: 49°59′31″N 8°14′19″E

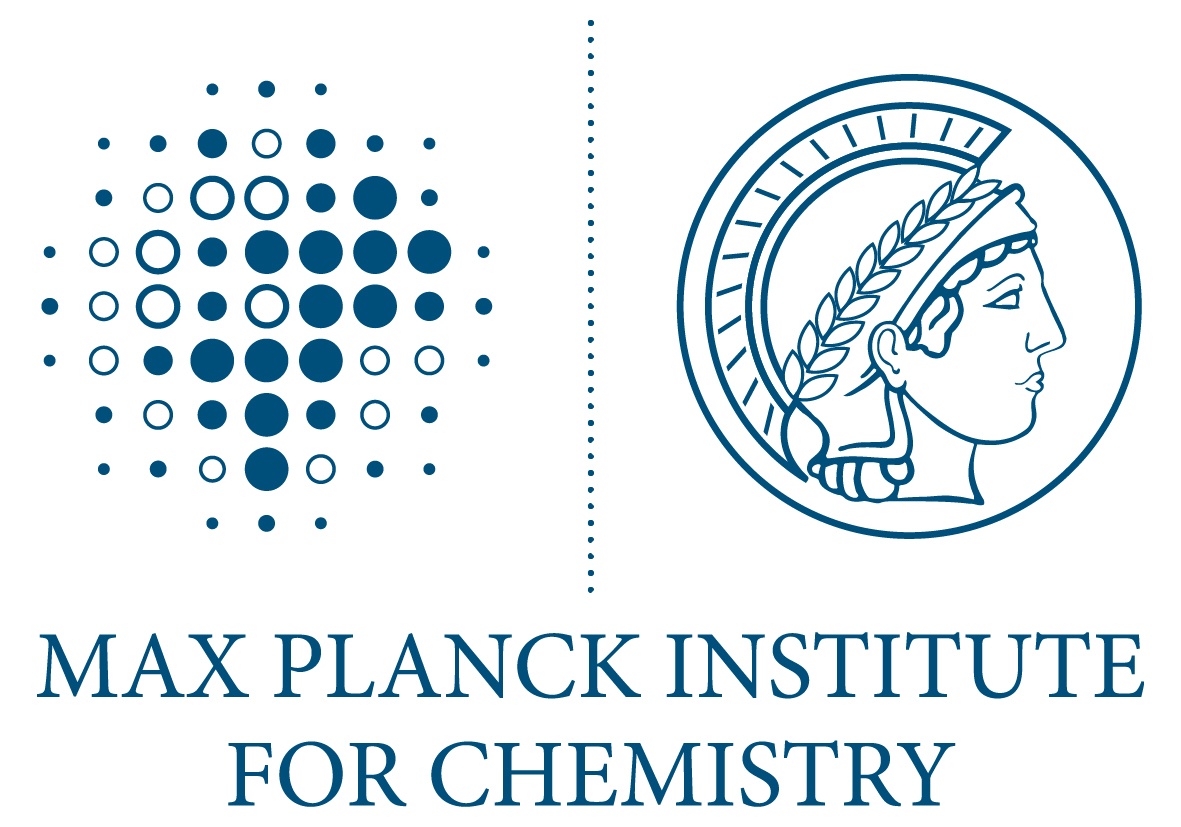
- Abbreviation: MPIC
- Predecessor: Kaiser Wilhelm Institute for Chemistry
- Formation: 1949
- Type: non-university research institute
- Headquarters: Munich, Germany
- Location: Mainz, Rhineland-Palatinate, Germany
- Official language: German, English
- Managing director: Gerald H. Haug
- Parent organization: Max Planck Society
- Staff: ~300
- Website: www.mpic.de

The Max Planck Institute for Chemistry (Otto Hahn Institute; German: Max Planck Institut für Chemie - Otto Hahn Institut) is a non-university research institute in Mainz, Germany; It is one of currently 85 Max Planck Institutes of the Max Planck Society (German: Max-Planck-Gesellschaft). Its predecessor was the Kaiser Wilhelm Institute for Chemistry in 1911 in Berlin.

The Institute aims at an integral understanding of chemical processes in the Earth system, particularly in the atmosphere and biosphere. Investigations address a wide range of interactions between air, water, soil, life and climate in the course of Earth history up to today's human-driven epoch, the Anthropocene. The institute consists of four scientific departments (Aerosol Chemistry, Atmospheric Chemistry, Climate Geochemistry, and Multiphase Chemistry) and additional research groups. The departments are led by their directors.

== Research ==
The institute consists of four scientific departments and additional research groups.

- Aerosol Chemistry Department: The Aerosol Chemistry Department led director Yafang Chengby aims to develop a mechanistic understanding and quantitative prediction of aerosol processes and effects in the Earth system and advance the fundamental theory of the physical chemistry of nanoparticles and microdroplets. It integrates field observations, instrument development, laboratory experiments, model simulations and machine learning to identify scientific key questions, test hypotheses, and advance theory. Research groups:
  - UTLS Aerosols (Franziska Köllner)
  - Wildfires and Impacts (Chaoqun Ma)
  - Integrated Assessment Modeling (Wenjun Meng)
  - Aerosol Field Experiments (Johannes Schneider)
  - Nanoscale Theory and Modeling (Huan Yang)
- Atmospheric Chemistry Department: The Atmospheric Chemistry Department which is led by director Eric A. Kort focuses on the study of ozone and other atmospheric photo-oxidants, their chemical reactions and global cycles. The researchers use kinetic and photochemical laboratory investigations, in situ and remote sensing measurements. The Atmospheric Chemistry department also develops numerical models to describe meteorological and chemical processes in the atmosphere, to simulate the complex atmospheric interactions and to test the theory through measurement campaigns (ground-based or by ship, aircraft, satellite). Research groups:
  - Reactive Processes (John Crowley)
  - Optical Spectroscopy (Horst Fischer)
  - Radical Measurements (Hartwig Harder)
  - Organic Reactive Species (Jonathan Williams)
  - Numerical modeling (Andrea Pozzer)
- Department of Climate Geochemistry: Director Gerald H. Haug and his team explore the climate-ocean-atmosphere system on annual up to geological timescales. Of particular interest is the Cenozoic (the past 65 million years). They investigate the changes in internal feedback processes, e.g. interactions between ocean and atmosphere, oceanic heat transport or its nutrient status. Moreover, the scientists study the biogeochemical processes in the polar oceans and their role in regulating atmospheric CO_{2} concentration between ice ages and warmer periods. Therefore, they examine geological archives such as sediments from the open ocean and speleothems. The department operates the Research sail yacht S/Y Eugen Seibold. Research groups:
  - Isotope Biogeochemistry (Stephen Galer)
  - Organic Isotope Geochemistry (Alfredo Martínez-García)
  - Micropaleontology (Ralf Schiebel)
  - Inorganic Gas Isotope Geochemistry (Hubert Vonhof)
- Multiphase Chemistry Department: The department of director Ulrich Pöschl deals with multiphase processes at the molecular level and its impact on the macroscopic and global scale. Concerning the Earth System and climate research, they focus on biological and organic aerosols, aerosol-cloud interactions and atmospheric surface exchange processes whereas in the field of life and health sciences, the researchers study the change of protein macromolecules, air pollution and how these affect allergic reactions and diseases. Research groups:
  - Biomolecular Analyses (Janine Fröhlich)
  - Organic Pollutants & Exposure (Gerhard Lammel)
  - Atmosphere-Biosphere Interactions in the Amazon (Bruno Backes Meller)
  - Multiscale Interactions & Integration (Ulrich Pöschl)
  - Chemical Kinetics and Reaction Mechanisms (Thomas Berkemeier)
- Further research groups: Thomas Wagner and his Satellite Research Group of analyzes satellite data in order to draw conclusions about tropospheric and stratospheric trace gases. Tina Lüdecke leads an Emmy Noether Research Group at the institute. The team focusses on questions about the onset and intensification of meat consumption in early hominins using a method to analyze nitrogen isotopes in tooth enamel.

== History ==
The institute was founded as Kaiser Wilhelm Institute for Chemistry in Berlin Dahlem in 1911. The founding director was Ernst Beckmann (1853-1923), who also directed the Department of Inorganic and Physical Chemistry. The Department of Organic Chemistry was led by Richard Willstatter (1872-1942), who won the Nobel Prize for Chemistry in 1915 for his work on plant pigments. The teamwork of Otto Hahn (1879-1968), Lise Meitner (1878-1968) and Fritz Straßmann (1902-1980) led to the discovery of nuclear fission in December 1938. Otto Hahn was director of the institute from 1928 to 1946. He received the Nobel Prize for Chemistry in 1944.

During World War II, in 1944, the Institute building was severely damaged as a result of air raids, including a raid on 15 February targeted to disrupt work on the German nuclear weapons program. Everything that hadn't been destroyed was then stored in a closed textile factory in Tailfingen, Württemberg (present-day Albstadt), where the institute continued the work it had started in Berlin for a time.

After World War II the institute moved to the campus of Johannes Gutenberg University of Mainz in 1949. In 1948 the Kaiser Wilhelm Society was restructured and renamed becoming the Max Planck Society, the institute was also renamed as the Max Planck Institute for Chemistry (1949). In order to adapt to changing scientific requirements, the institute's research activities changed several times over the years. When classic chemistry was practiced in the early years, it later focussed on Radiochemistry, Cosmochemistry, Nuclear Physics, and mass spectrometry. These days the Max Planck Institute for Chemistry focusses on an integral scientific understanding of chemical processes in the Earth System from molecular to global scales.

== Nobel laureates of the institute ==
- Richard Willstätter, director from 1912 until 1916. In 1915, he received the Nobel Prize for Chemistry for his research into plant dyes, primarily chlorophyll. He discovered, among other things, that the structure of green dye exhibits significant similarity to the structure of the red blood pigment hemoglobin.
- Otto Hahn, director of the department for radioactive research from 1912 until 1948, from 1928 until 1946 managing director of the institute. The joint research by Otto Hahn, Lise Meitner, Fritz Straßmann and Otto Robert Frisch into transuranic elements led to the discovery of nuclear fission in 1938. In 1945, Otto Hahn received the Nobel Prize for this.
- Paul J. Crutzen, director of the Atmospheric Chemistry Department from 1980 until 2000, Nobel Prize for Chemistry 1995 for investigations on the formation and destruction of ozone in the atmosphere.

== Staff ==
The institute employs approximately 300 staff members across four departments: Aerosol Chemistry, Atmospheric Chemistry, Climate Geochemistry and Multiphase Chemistry.

== Paul Crutzen Graduate School (PCGS) ==
The Paul Crutzen Graduate School (PCGS) at MPI for Chemistry offers a PhD program in atmospheric chemistry and physics, environmental physics and geophysics. The program should enable the PhD students to widen their knowledge and skills beyond the research topic of the doctoral project by visiting different lectures, workshops, soft skill courses, an annual PhD Symposium and summer schools. It was established by the Max Planck Society in January 2003. The Graduate School is in close cooperation with the University of Mainz (Institute for Physics of the Atmosphere), the University of Heidelberg (Institute for Environmental Physics), University of Frankfurt (Institute for Atmospheric and Environmental Sciences).

== Max Planck Graduate Center (MPGC) ==
The Max Planck Graduate Center (MPGC) is a virtual department across the Max Planck Institut for Polymer Research, the Max Planck Institute for Chemistry, and four faculties of the Johannes Gutenberg University of Mainz, created for interdisciplinary projects. It offers a PhD program in these research topics to candidates from all over the world.

== Directors of the institute ==
=== Kaiser Wilhelm Institute for Chemistry ===
- 1912 Ernst Beckmann
- 1912 - 1916 Richard Willstätter
- 1912 - 1948 Otto Hahn
- 1916 - 1926 Alfred Stock

=== Max Planck Institute for Chemistry ===
- 1949 - 1953 Fritz Straßmann
- 1941 - 1965 Josef Mattauch
- 1953 - 1958 Friedrich A. Paneth
- 1959 - 1978 Heinrich Hintenberger
- 1959 - 1978 Hermann Wäffler
- 1967 - 1996 Heinrich Wänke
- 1968 - 1979 Christian Junge
- 1978 - 1995 Friedrich Begemann
- 1980 - 2000 Paul J. Crutzen
- 1980 - 2007 Albrecht W. Hofmann
- 1987 - 2017 Meinrat O. Andreae
- 1996 - 2021 Günter W. Lugmair
- 2000 - 2025 Johannes Lelieveld
- 2001 - 2025 Stephan Borrmann
- 2014 Ulrich Pöschl
- 2015 Gerald Haug (managing director since summer 2025)
- 2024 Yafang Cheng
- 2026 Eric A. Kort

== Collaborative projects ==
- The Earth and Solar System Research Partnership (ESRP) pools research excellence across disciplines to understand how the Earth functions as a complex system and to improve the predictability of the effects of human actions. It encompasses the Max-Planck-Institutes for Biogeochemistry in Jena, for Chemistry in Mainz, for Geoanthropology in Jena, for Meteorology in Hamburg, and for Solar System Research in Göttingen. Over the last century, marked changes in climate, air quality, biodiversity, and water availability occurred. More and potentially more rapid changes are predicted. To find solutions to the challenges these changes pose, the ESRP studies the complex interactions and feedbacks of land, ocean, atmosphere, biosphere and humans in the field, the lab and through models.
- ATTO: "ATTO" stands for Amazonian Tall Tower Observatory. The German-Brazilian joint project was launched in 2009. The German coordinator is Prof. Dr. Sue Trumbore at the Max Planck Institute for Biogeochemistry in Jena. The tower aims at delivering groundbreaking findings which will be the basis for improved climate models. With a height of 325 meters the tower extends the ground-level boundary layer, and will provide information taken from approximately 100 squarekilometers from the world's largest forest area. ATTO is the counterpart of the 2006 completed ZOTTO tower that stands in Siberia. ATTO is integrated into an existing structure of smaller Brazilian measuring towers.
- HALO: HALO - The High Altitude and LOng Range Research Aircraft is a Research Aircraft for atmospheric research and earth observation of the German Science Community. HALO is funded by the Federal Ministry of Education and Research, the Helmholtz-Gemeinschaft and the Max-Planck-Gesellschaft.
- CARIBIC: Global Atmospheric Composition and Climate Change Research EUROPE's SOLUTION FOR GLOBAL ATMOSPHERE MONITORING. CARIBIC is an innovative scientific project to study and monitor important chemical and physical processes in the Earth's atmosphere. Detailed and extensive measurements are made during long-distance flights. Since October 2015 the CARIBIC project has moved to the Karlsruhe Institute of Technology and the Institute of Meteorology and Climate Research - Atmospheric Trace Gases and Remote Sensing.

== Databases ==
The institute provides four databases which give information about 1) reference materials of geological and environmental interest (GeoReM), 2) UV/VIS absorption cross sections, and 3) Henry's law constants.

== Literature ==
- Norris, Robert S. (2002). Racing for the Bomb: General Leslie R. Groves, the Manhattan Project's Indispensable Man. South Royalton, Vermont: Steerforth Press. ISBN 1-58642-039-9. OCLC 48544060.
- 100 Jahre Kaiser-Wilhelm-/Max-Planck-Institut für Chemie (Otto-Hahn-Institut) – Facetten seiner Geschichte, Im Auftrag des Direktoriums des Max-Planck-Instituts für Chemie herausgegeben von Horst Kant und Carsten Reinhardt, Archiv der Max-Planck-Gesellschaft, Berlin 2012, ISBN 978-3-927579-26-2, online, PDF
- Kaiser-Wilhelm-/Max-Planck-Institut für Chemie (Otto-Hahn-Institut), (Max Planck Institute for Chemistry) (CPTS). In: Eckart Henning, Marion Kazemi: Handbuch zur Institutsgeschichte der Kaiser-Wilhelm-/ Max-Planck-Gesellschaft zur Förderung der Wissenschaften 1911–2011 – Daten und Quellen, Berlin 2016, 2 Teilbände, Teilband 1: Institute und Forschungsstellen A–L (online, PDF, 75 MB) Seite 321–356 (Chronologie beider Institute)
- Denkorte – Max-Planck-Gesellschaft und Kaiser-Wilhelm-Gesellschaft, Brüche und Kontinuitäten 1911-2011, 2010 Sandstein Verlag Dresden and Max-Planck-Gesellschaft, ISBN 978-3-942422-01-7, S. 258–265.
