= Penelope L. King =

Geochemistry researcher

Penelope (Penny) L. King
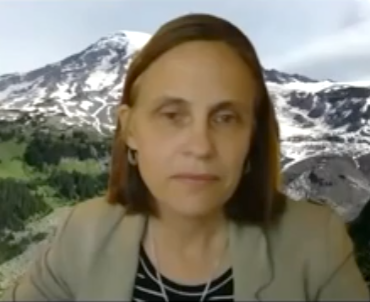
- In an ANU video in 2020
- Education: Australian National University, B.S. (1993) Arizona State University, Ph.D. (1999)
- Awards: Fellow, 2019 American Geophysical Union (AGU); Joanne Simpson Medal for Mid-Career Scientists, 2019; Fellow, 2019, Mineralogical Society of America; Clare Burton Award for Equity and Diversity 2017; Senior Fellow - Higher Education Academy 2017
- Scientific career
- Fields: Geochemistry, cosmochemistry
- Workplaces: Australian National University

Penelope King uses geochemistry and cosmochemistry to study planetary processes to better understand past and future planetary environments, and what this information may tells us about climate change. She is a professor at the Australian National University (ANU) in the Research School of Earth Sciences (RSES). King holds many awards, including Fellow of the American Geophysical Union and the Mineralogical Society of America in 2019, and winning the AGU Joanne Simpson Medal for Mid-Career Scientists the same year. She currently leads a research group examining surface and interior processes on planetary bodies.

== Early life and education ==
Penelope King was born in Canada and moved several times early in her life, first to the United States and then her parents' native Australia. She grew up in Canberra, Australia, where the regional bushland provided many outdoor activities which King enjoyed. When King was nine, her family lived in England for a year. While in England, she had an assignment on columnar basalt and visited some of the islands that are part of the “Giant’s Causeway”. Geology did not become a part of King’s life again until she went to college. King attended the Australian National University (ANU) for her undergraduate education. While at ANU, a family friend suggested that a job working outside and traveling may be suitable for King. Geography was the first option King considered, but then she decided to join her friends in the geology program. She earned her Bachelor of Science from the department of geology in 1993, graduating with honors. She went on to earn her Ph.D. in geology at Arizona State University (ASU), graduating in 1999.

== Career and research ==
After her graduate studies, King has made significant impacts as a professor at multiple institutions. King was an assistant professor in the Department of Earth Sciences at the University of Western Ontario from 1999 to 2006, earning tenure in 2006. From 2007 to 2011, King was the senior research scientist III for the Institute of Meteoritics at the University of New Mexico. In 2012 King returned to the Australian National University, holding the positions of Fellow (2012–2014), ARC Future Fellow (2014–2018), and senior fellow (2015–2018) at the Research School of Earth Sciences (RSES). King was awarded a professorship at the RSES in 2019, where she is currently working. King has also held visiting and adjunct positions at other institutions, including Mesa Community College (1999), Arizona State University (1999), University of Tennessee Knoxville (2005), University of Western Ontario (2007–2012), and the University of Guelph (2011–2015).

King’s areas of expertise include geology, geochemistry, volcanology, surface processes, and extraterrestrial geology. King’s early research focused on the mineralogy, chemical composition, crystallization temperatures, and the petrogenesis of the aluminous A-type granites found in the Lachlan Fold Belt in Australia. With this information, King and her team were able to make a more coherent description and defining characteristics of A-type granites while acknowledging and providing evidence for inappropriate characterizations stated in other literature. In recent years, King has done significant research on planetary chemistry, such as gas-solid interactions involved in planetary processes and methane variation on Mars's Gale Crater using observations from the Curiosity rover. She has authored and co-authored over 80 articles and papers, as well as edited two books.

King currently leads a research group that is studying surface and interior processes on planetary bodies. Using remote and infrared techniques to study the interaction of planetary materials with gases, she is hoping to understand how materials in the Solar System behave and interact. This information can give insight into past and future planetary environments, earth processes, planetary formation, and climate change issues. As a teacher, King says she is passionate about improving career opportunities for a diversity of people and opening pathways for underrepresented people in the workplace.

== Awards ==
King has received multiple highly prestigious academic awards:

- Fellow - American Geophysical Union (AGU) 2019
- AGU Joanne Simpson Medal for Mid-Career Scientists, 2019
- Fellow - Mineralogical Society of America 2019
- ANU VC's Staff Excellence Award - Clare Burton Award for Equity and Diversity, 2017
- Senior Fellow - Higher Education Academy 2017
- Australian Research Council Future Fellowship, 2014-18
- NASA Group Award: MSL (Mars Science Laboratory) APXS (alpha particle X-ray spectrometer) Instrument Development and Science Team, 2013, 2015
- Mineralogical Society of America Distinguished Lecturer 2005
- Premier's Research Excellence Award (Ontario, Canada) 2002
- Canada Foundation for Innovation (New Opp.) 2000
- Ontario Innovation Trust award (Canada) 2000
- Sigma Xi Honorary Member 1999

== Publications ==
=== Books ===
- Infrared Spectroscopy in Geochemistry, Exploration Geochemistry and Planetary Science (King, Ramsey & Swayze, eds., 2004)
- High-Temperature Gas-Solid Reactions in Earth and Planetary Processes (King, Fegley & Seward, eds., 2018)

=== Other publications ===
- "Characterization and origin of aluminous A-type granites from The Lachlan Fold Belt, southeastern Australia", 1997 Journal of petrology
- "Are A-type granites the high-temperature felsic granites? Evidence from fractionated granites of the Wangrah Suite", 2001 Australian Journal of Earth Sciences
- "SIMS analysis of volatiles in Silcate glasses: 1. Calibration, matrix effects and comparisons with FTIR", 2002 Chemical Geology
- "Implications of reactions between SO_{2} and basaltic glasses for the mineralogy of planetary crusts", 2019 Journal of Geophysical Research
- "The methane diurnal variation and microseepage flux at Gale crater, Mars as constrained by ExoMars Trace Gas Orbiter and Curiosity observations", 2019 Geophysical Research Letters
- "Gas-solid reactions: theory, experiments and case studies relevant to Earth and planetary processes", 2018 Rev Mineral Geochem
