= Nele Meckler =

Paleoclimatologist based in Bergen

Dr. Nele Meckler
- Other names: Anna Nele Meckler
- Scientific career
- Fields: Paleoceanography, Paleoclimatology
- Institutions: University of Bergen
- Thesis: (2006)
- Doctoral advisors: Gerald Haug, Daniel Sigman

Anna Nele Meckler is a professor of Earth Sciences at the University of Bergen, and is also affiliated with the Bjerknes Centre for Climate Research. She specialises in paleoceanography and paleoclimatology, and leads multiple grants to develop new techniques to reconstruct past temperatures, most importantly clumped isotope thermometry. By analysing speleothems Meckler's team can identify how past levels of CO_{2} in the atmosphere correlate with temperature changes, which gives essential knowledge for predicting future climate change.

== Education and career ==
Following her Master of Geoecology at the University of Bayreuth, Meckler completed her PhD dissertation in paleo-oceanography in 2006 at ETH Zurich, with Gerald Haug and Daniel Sigman as her supervisors. She continued to work there as a postdoctoral researcher, and then spent two years at the Department of Earth and Planetary Sciences at California Institute of Technology, followed by a year as a guest researcher at the University of Oslo, and a second period at ETH Zurich, where she held a Marie Heim-Vögtlin grant from the Swiss National Science Foundation.

In 2015, Meckler won an ERC Starting Grant and moved to the University of Bergen, where she has been since, first as a researcher, then as an Associate Professor and Full Professor. She currently holds both an ERC Consolidator and a Norwegian Research Council grant to further her research.

In 2022 she was inducted into the Norwegian Academy of Science and Letters.

== Major grants and awards ==
- 2021–2026: DOTpaleo: Deep Ocean Temperatures in the Paleogene Greenhouse. Funded by the Research Council of Norway (12 million NOK)
- 2021–2026: FluidMICS: Fluid Inclusion Microthermometry in Speleothems. Funded by the European Research Council (ERC Consolidator Grant, €2 million). The FluidMICS project studies "stalagmites in tropical caves, where tiny drops of water are preserved from the time when the water dripped from the cave ceiling".
- 2017–2021: T-TRAC: Tropical Temperature Reconstruction Across 0.5 million years from Cave formations. Funded by the Norwegian Research Council.
- 2015–2020: ERC Starting Grant. Reconstructions of past climate using ocean sediments and cave rock (stalagmite) as archives"
- 2012–2014: Marie Heim-Vögtlin Grant. The MHV grant, from the Swiss National Science Foundation, allowed Meckler to spend two years at California Institute of Technology.
