= Jennifer Biddle =

American ecologist and academic

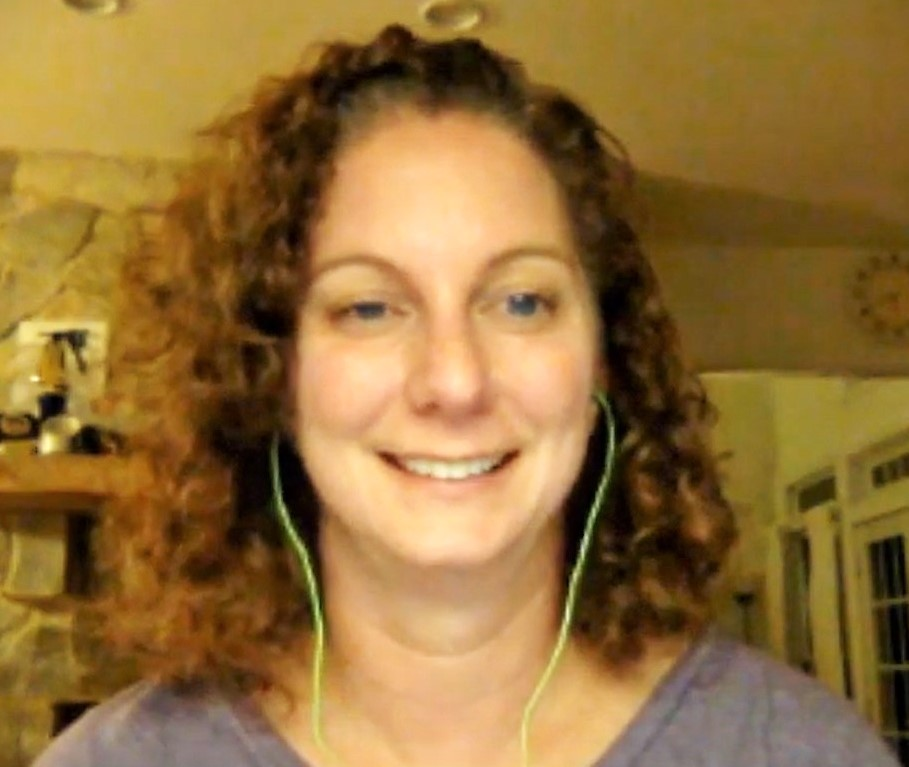
- Biddle on MythWits in 2019
- Born: Jennifer F. Biddle
- Education: Rutgers University; Pennsylvania State University
- Scientific career
- Fields: Biology; Molecular biology Metagenomics; Archaea; Subsurface
- Workplaces: University of Delaware; University of North Carolina at Chapel Hill
- Thesis: Microbial populations and processes in subseafloor marine environments (2006)
- Doctoral advisor: Jean Brenchley
- Website: www.udel.edu/academics/colleges/ceoe/departments/smsp/faculty/jennifer-biddle/

Jennifer F. Biddle is an American ecologist who is a professor of microbial ecology at the University of Delaware.

== Early life and education ==
Biddle was an undergraduate student at Rutgers University, where she studied biotechnology. She was a doctoral researcher at Pennsylvania State University, where she studied microbial populations in sub-seafloor marine environments with Jean Brenchley.

== Research and career ==
Biddle joined the Department of Geosciences, then moved to University of North Carolina at Chapel Hill as a postdoctoral researcher in 2007, supported by the NASA postdoctoral program. Biddle is interested in the microbial ecology of subsurface environments. Her early research made use of deep sea drilling to identify organisms in the ocean floor. She used genomic analysis to identify microbes in sediment collected 500 feet below the ocean floor during the International Ocean Discovery Program in 2002.

Biddle also investigated the organisms in deep lakes in the Canadian Rockies. She studied Pavilion Lake through genomic analysis of a series of samples collected at different depths. Working with ExxonMobil, Biddle demonstrated that microbial communities found in deeper seafloor sediments in and around sites of hydrocarbon seepage had considerable available energy and high population turnover rates.

In 2010, Biddle was appointed an assistant professor at the University of Delaware. She was promoted to associate professor in 2017 and full Professor in 2022.

=== Awards and honors ===
- 2013 International Ocean Drilling Program Distinguished Lecturer
- 2019 American Geophysical Union Fall Meeting Program Representatives
- 2021 American Geophysical Union Joanne Simpson Medal
- 2023 Fellow of the American Academy of Microbiology

=== Selected publications ===
- Luke R Thompson; Jon G Sanders; Daniel McDonald; et al. (1 November 2017). "A communal catalogue reveals Earth's multiscale microbial diversity". Nature. 551 (7681): 457–463. doi:10.1038/nature24621. ISSN 1476-4687. PMC 6192678. PMID 29088705. Wikidata Q46349678.
- Jennifer F. Biddle; Julius S Lipp; Mark A. Lever; et al. (27 February 2006). "Heterotrophic Archaea dominate sedimentary subsurface ecosystems off Peru". Proceedings of the National Academy of Sciences of the United States of America. 103 (10): 3846–3851. Bibcode:2006PNAS..103.3846B. doi:10.1073/pnas.0600035103. ISSN 0027-8424. PMC 1533785. PMID 16505362. Wikidata Q28768174.
- Jennifer F. Biddle; Sorel Fitz-Gibbon; Stephan C Schuster; Jean E Brenchley; Christopher H House (23 July 2008). "Metagenomic signatures of the Peru Margin subseafloor biosphere show a genetically distinct environment". Proceedings of the National Academy of Sciences of the United States of America. 105 (30): 10583–10588. Bibcode:2008PNAS..10510583B. doi:10.1073/pnas.0709942105. ISSN 0027-8424. PMC 2492506. PMID 18650394. Wikidata Q36802597.
- William D Orsi; Virginia P Edgcomb; Glenn D Christman; Jennifer F Biddle (12 June 2013). "Gene expression in the deep biosphere". Nature. 499 (7457): 205–208. doi:10.1038/nature12230. ISSN 1476-4687. PMID 23760485. Wikidata Q53102754.
