= Tanja Weil =

German chemist

Tanja Weil is a German chemist known for her research for in macromolecular chemistry, dendrimers, dyes, protein, and peptides. As of 2025, Weil holds the position of director at the Max Planck Institute for Polymer Research.

== Education ==
Weil conducted her undergraduate in chemistry at the Technical University of Braunschweig in Germany from 1993 until 1998. She then moved to the University of Bordeaux I in France from 1993 to 1998. She did her Ph.D. under the mentorship of Klaus Müllen at the Max Planck Institute for Polymer Research from 1998 to 2002.

== Career ==
From 2002–2008 Weil was the director of Chemical Research and Development at Merz Pharmaceuticals GmbH in Frankfurt. In 2008, she joined the National University of Singapore as an associate professor. She then worked at Ulm University from 2010 to 2016. In 2017 she moved to the Max Planck Institute for Polymer Research where she heads the division of Synthesis of Macromolecules.

== Research ==
Weil is known for her work on the synthesis and development of macromolecules with precise structural characteristics and versatile functionalities. The press has covered her research include her 2024 work that described a material that separates chemical compounds with similar sizes, but varying chemical properties, and her 2023 research that used fibers similar viruses to introduce DNA into cells.

== Selected publications ==
- Weil, Tanja; Reuther, Erik; Müllen, Klaus (2002). "Shape-Persistent, Fluorescent Polyphenylene Dyads and a Triad for Efficient Vectorial Transduction of Excitation Energy". Angewandte Chemie. 114 (11): 1980–1984. doi:10.1002/1521-3757(20020603)114:11<1980::AID-ANGE1980>3.0.CO;2-Z. ISSN 1521-3757.
- Weil, Tanja; Reuther, Erik; Müllen, Klaus (2002). "Shape-Persistent, Fluorescent Polyphenylene Dyads and a Triad for Efficient Vectorial Transduction of Excitation Energy". Angewandte Chemie. 114 (11): 1980–1984. doi:10.1002/1521-3757(20020603)114:11<1980::AID-ANGE1980>3.0.CO;2-Z. ISSN 1521-3757.
- Weil, Tanja; Vosch, Tom; Hofkens, Johan; Peneva, Kalina; Müllen, Klaus (2010-11-22). "The Rylene Colorant Family—Tailored Nanoemitters for Photonics Research and Applications". Angewandte Chemie International Edition. 49 (48): 9068–9093. doi:10.1002/anie.200902532. ISSN 1433-7851. PMID 20973116.
- Whitfield, Colette J.; Zhang, Meizhou; Winterwerber, Pia; Wu, Yuzhou; Ng, David Y. W.; Weil, Tanja (2021-09-22). "Functional DNA–Polymer Conjugates". Chemical Reviews. 121 (18): 11030–11084. doi:10.1021/acs.chemrev.0c01074. ISSN 0009-2665. PMC 8461608. PMID 33739829.

== Awards and honors ==
In 2002 she received the Otto Hahn Medal. In 2014 she gave the Bruno-Werdelmann lecture. Weil received the Netherlands Scholar Award for Supramolecular Chemistry in 2020. In 2023 Weil received the Karl Ziegler award.
