= Dalia Kirschbaum =

American Earth scientist

- Education: Columbia University
- Scientific career
- Thesis: Multi-scale landslide hazard and risk assessment : a modeling and multivariate statistical approach (2009)

Dalia B. Kirschbaum is an Earth scientist specializing in hydrology and natural hazards.

== Education and career ==
Kirschbaum earned an A.B. in Geosciences from Princeton University in 2004, focusing on environmental policy. She completed her M.A. (2006) and M.Phil. (2007) in Earth and Environmental Sciences at Columbia University, where her doctoral research assessed multiscale landslide hazard and risk assessments. She received her Ph.D. in 2009 under the supervision of Arthur Lerner-Lam.

Kirschbaum joined the NASA Goddard Space Flight Center in 2011 as a research scientist. In 2022 she took the position of director of the NASA Goddard Space Flight Center Earth Sciences Division.

== Research ==
Her work integrates satellite remote sensing with hazard modeling to improve predictions of rainfall-triggered landslides. She developed the Global Landslide Hazard Forecasting System and initiated the Global Landslide Catalog, providing accessible global data for landslide risks.

Kirschbaum’s research primarily focuses on rainfall-triggered landslides. Her work integrates remote sensing data with hazard modeling to improve the accuracy of regional and global landslide assessments. She led the development of a global landslide hazard forecasting system and the Global Landslide Catalog, a publicly accessible database that compiles landslide reports from around the world. These efforts have significantly advanced situational awareness and risk mitigation strategies for landslide-prone regions. As part of her broader contributions to Earth science, she has developed web-based interfaces like the Landslide Reporter platform, which allows citizen scientists to contribute observations to the Global Landslide Catalog. Her team’s work has improved hazard modeling, particularly in using satellite-derived precipitation data to forecast extreme weather-related risks.

She also led educational initiatives tied to the Global Precipitation Measurement Mission.

== Awards and honors ==
In 2017 Kirschbaum received the Presidential Early Career Award for Scientists and Engineers. In 2022 she received the NOAA David Johnson Award for her work on landslide data. In 2023 Kirschbaun received the Joanne Simpson Medal and was named a Union Fellow by the American Geophysical Union. In 2023 Kirschbaum led the team that received NASA's Software of the Year Award.

== Selected publications ==
- Kirschbaum, Dalia Bach; Adler, Robert; Hong, Yang; Hill, Stephanie; Lerner-Lam, Arthur (2010). "A global landslide catalog for hazard applications: method, results, and limitations" (PDF). Natural Hazards. 52 (3): 561–575. doi:10.1007/s11069-009-9401-4. ISSN 0921-030X.
- Kirschbaum, Dalia; Stanley, Thomas; Zhou, Yaping (2015). "Spatial and temporal analysis of a global landslide catalog". Geomorphology. 249: 4–15. doi:10.1016/j.geomorph.2015.03.016. hdl:11603/25096.
- Skofronick-Jackson, Gail; Petersen, Walter A.; Berg, Wesley; Kidd, Chris; Stocker, Erich F.; Kirschbaum, Dalia B.; Kakar, Ramesh; Braun, Scott A.; Huffman, George J.; Iguchi, Toshio; Kirstetter, Pierre E.; Kummerow, Christian; Meneghini, Robert; Oki, Riko; Olson, William S.; Takayabu, Yukari N.; Furukawa, Kinji; Wilheit, Thomas (2017-08-01). "The Global Precipitation Measurement (GPM) Mission for Science and Society" (PDF). Bulletin of the American Meteorological Society. 98 (8): 1679–1695. doi:10.1175/BAMS-D-15-00306.1. ISSN 0003-0007. PMC 6662228. PMID 31359880.
- Kirschbaum, Dalia; Stanley, Thomas (2018). "Satellite-Based Assessment of Rainfall-Triggered Landslide Hazard for Situational Awareness". Earth's Future. 6 (3): 505–523. doi:10.1002/2017EF000715. hdl:11603/26101. ISSN 2328-4277. PMC 6839699. PMID 31709272.
