= Nandita Basu =

Scientist and professor

- Education: Purdue University (PhD), Indian Institute of Technology (MS), Jadavpur University (BTech)
- Scientific career
- Fields: Water sustainability and ecohydrology
- Workplaces: University of Waterloo
- Thesis: Flux based site assessment and design of an integrated remediation system (2006)
- Doctoral advisor: Suresh Rao
- Website: http://nanditabasu.weebly.com/

Nandita Basu is a professor and Canada Research Chair in Global Water Sustainability and Ecohydrology at the University of Waterloo. She has been a fellow of the Royal Society of Canada's College of New Scholars, Artists and Scientists since 2019.

== Early life and education ==
Basu was raised in Kolkata, India. She developed an interest in water quality as a child, unable to drink tap water without boiling it and credits an interest in science to her grandfather.

Basu obtained a Bachelor of Civil Engineering from Jadavpur University in 1997 and a Master of Technology in Environmental Technology from the Indian Institute of Technology in 2001. Following her master's studies, she immigrated to the United States to pursue a doctorate. She completed a PhD in Civil Engineering from Purdue University in 2006.

== Career and research ==
Basu is a professor and a Canada Research Chair in Global Water Sustainability at the University of Waterloo in Waterloo, Ontario, Canada where she runs the Basu Lab. Prior to joining Waterloo in 2013, she was a professor at the University of Iowa. Her research focuses on water sustainability challenges through the study of landscape, hydrology, and biochemistry and the role humans play in changing such patterns. Basu's research has indicated reductions in the use of fertilizer can take decades to take effect in bodies of water. She has also demonstrated the effectiveness of standalone wetlands in filtering pollutants.

== Awards and honors ==
Basu was named a fellow of the Royal Society of Canada's College of New Scholars, Artists and Scientists in 2019 in recognition of her work to identify the role nutrient legacies play in preventing the achievement of water quality goals and solutions proposed to improve the water quality of lakes and coastal zones. In 2023 she was the recipient of the Joanne Simpson Medal from the American Geophysical Union in part for her "pioneering work to develop methods and models for predicting how watershed conservation efforts can be used to mitigate these challenges."
