= Hans-Wolfgang Spiess =

German chemist

Hans-Wolfgang Spiess (born 14 October 1942 in Frankfurt am Main), also Hans Wolfgang Spiess, is a German polymer chemist who specializes in the Nuclear magnetic resonance spectroscopy of macromolecules. He was director of the Max Planck Institute for Polymer Research in Mainz until his retirement in 2012.

== Education and career ==
Spiess obtained his PhD in physical chemistry from the Goethe University of Frankfurt in 1968, under the supervision of Hermann Hartmann. He then did postdoctoral work with Raymond K. Sheline at the Florida State University. In 1970, he moved to the Department of Molecular Physics headed by Karl H. Hausser at the Max Planck Institute for Medical Research in Heidelberg, where he studied high-resolution NMR in solids and liquids. In 1975, he moved to the Institute of Physical Chemistry at the University of Mainz, where he worked with Hans Sillescu and obtained his habilitation in 1978. From 1981 to 1982, he was professor of physical chemistry at the University of Münster, and from 1983, he was professor of macromolecular chemistry at the University of Bayreuth.

In 1984, Spiess became director of the Max Planck Institute for Polymer Research in Mainz. His research focuses on NMR methods and studies for the determination of the structure, dynamics, and phase behavior of synthetic macromolecules and supramolecular structures.

== Honors and awards ==
In 2002, Spiess received the Liebig Medal and the Ampère Prize, in 2010 the Paul J. Flory Research Prize and the Zavoisky award, in 2005 the Walter Nernst Medal, and in 1988 the Gottfried Wilhelm Leibniz Prize. He is an honorary doctor at the Technical University of Cluj-Napoca in Romania and at the Adam Mickiewicz University in Poznań, and an honorary professor at the East China Normal University in Shanghai. In December 2011, Spiess received the Order of Merit of the State of Rhineland-Palatinate.

From 1991 to 1992, Spiess was a member of the board of the European Polymer Federation.
