= Katharina Landfester =

German chemist

- Education: Max Planck Institute for Polymer Research
- Scientific career
- Workplaces: Max Planck Institute for Polymer Research; Lehigh University; Max Planck Institute of Colloids and Interfaces
- Thesis: Synthese und Charakterisierung von Kern-Mantel-Latices mit Elektronenmikroskopie und Festkörper-NMR (1995)
- Website: Landfester Group

Katharina Landfester is a German chemist who is a professor at the Max Planck Institute for Polymer Research. Her research considers the physical properties of droplets, polymerisation in emulsion and the synthesis of nanoparticles.

== Early life and education ==
Landfester studied chemistry at the Technical University of Darmstadt and graduated in 1993. During her undergraduate degree she was a research intern at the École européenne de chimie, polymères et matériaux (then Ecole d’Application des Hauts Polymères). She joined the Max Planck Institute for Polymer Research as a graduate student, where she worked with Hans W. Spiess on the characterisation of polymers using solid-state nuclear magnetic resonance. She moved to the United States as a postdoctoral researcher, where she joined Lehigh University. She returned to Germany, where she joined the Max Planck Institute of Colloids and Interfaces and oversaw the emulsion group.

== Research and career ==
Landfester joined the University of Ulm as a full professor and head of the Department of Organic Chemistry. Whilst at the university, she started to explore materials for biomedical applications, with a focus on better understanding the interactions of nanoparticles with cellular compartments. By 2008 she had been appointed director of the Max Planck Institute for Polymer Research.

Landfester has studied colloids with precisely controlled physical properties. Colloids are particles suspended in a liquid, and can permit the encapsulation of therapeutic and self-healing agents as well as the creation of specific nanostructures. She is interested in the creation of protocells – vesicular structures that are generally considered the minimal units of synthetic biology – from self-assembled block copolymers. These block copolymers contain permeable nanocontainers that can act as cell-like functions.

== Awards and honours ==
- 2001 Reimund Stadler prize
- 2002 University of Potsdam Habilitation in Physical Chemistry
- 2002 Member of the Junge Akademie
- 2010 Elected to AcademiaNet
- 2011 Elected member of Acatech
- 2024 Liebig Medal

== Selected publications ==
- Tenzer, Stefan; Docter, Dominic; Kuharev, Jörg; Musyanovych, Anna; Fetz, Verena; Hecht, Rouven; Schlenk, Florian; Fischer, Dagmar; Kiouptsi, Klytaimnistra; Reinhardt, Christoph; Landfester, Katharina (2013-09-22). "Rapid formation of plasma protein corona critically affects nanoparticle pathophysiology". Nature Nanotechnology. 8 (10): 772–781. Bibcode:2013NatNa...8..772T. doi:10.1038/nnano.2013.181. ISSN 1748-3387. PMID 24056901.
- Antonietti, M; Landfester, K (2002). "Polyreactions in miniemulsions". Progress in Polymer Science. 27 (4): 689–757. doi:10.1016/S0079-6700(01)00051-X.
- Landfester, Katharina (2009). "Miniemulsion Polymerization and the Structure of Polymer and Hybrid Nanoparticles". Angewandte Chemie International Edition. 48 (25): 4488–4507. Bibcode:2009ACIE...48.4488L. doi:10.1002/anie.200900723. ISSN 1521-3773. PMID 19455531.
- Schöttler, Susanne; Becker, Greta; Winzen, Svenja; Steinbach, Tobias; Mohr, Kristin; Landfester, Katharina; Mailänder, Volker; Wurm, Frederik R. (2016). "Protein adsorption is required for stealth effect of poly(ethylene glycol)- and poly(phosphoester)-coated nanocarriers". Nature Nanotechnology. 11 (4): 372–377. Bibcode:2016NatNa..11..372S. doi:10.1038/nnano.2015.330. ISSN 1748-3395. PMID 26878141.
