= Susan M. Natali =

American scientist at the Woodwell Climate Research Center

Sue Natali
- Born: Susan M. Natali; July 18, 1969 (age 57); Elmwood Park, New Jersey
- Education: Villanova University (BS), Stony Brook University (PhD)
- Occupation: Associate scientist at Woodwell Climate Research Center
- Website: https://www.capenews.net/falmouth/news/woods-hole-scientists-named-to-state-federal-climate-advisories/article_758f2ccf-75e3-55db-8cc8-926fc3a264f7.html

Susan M. Natali is an American ecologist. She is the Arctic program director and senior scientist at the Woodwell Climate Research Center (formerly Woods Hole Research Center), where her research focuses on the impact of climate change on terrestrial ecosystems, primarily on Arctic permafrost. She is also the project lead for Permafrost Pathways, a new initiative launched in 2022 with funding from TED's Audacious Project. On Monday, April 11, 2022, Dr. Natali gave a TED Talk introducing the Permafrost Pathways project at the TED2022 conference in Vancouver, BC.

== Background and education ==
Sue Natali was born on July 18, 1969, and was raised in Elmwood Park, New Jersey. She has three sisters and a brother. In 1991, Natali graduated from Villanova University, where she received a B.S. in biology, and in 2008 she completed her Ph.D. in ecology and evolution at Stony Brook University. Natali worked with academic advisors Manuel Lerdau and Sergio Sañudo-Wilhelmy at Stony Brook University while pursuing her Ph.D., and wrote her thesis on the "Effects of Elevated CO_{2} on Trace Metal Cycling in Plants and Soils".

== Career and research ==
After completing her Ph.D. in 2008, Natali became a postdoctoral fellow at the University of Florida, where she was employed as a postdoctoral associate until 2010. From 2010 to 2012, Natali was appointed as a postdoctoral research fellow of the National Science Foundation Office of Polar Programs. Afterwards, Natali joined the Woods Hole Research Center (now Woodwell Climate Research Center) as an assistant scientist, and in 2015 was appointed as an associate scientist, where she currently conducts research.

Notably, Natali tested how periods of warming and the thawing of tundra permafrost might impact the carbon cycle. In 2015, Natali conducted an experiment in the Arctic tundra to examine the impacts soil drying has on the release of carbon and methane into the atmosphere. She found that the drying of tundra soil drastically increases the amount of carbon and methane emitted into the atmosphere as permafrost thaws. Natali's research has been publicized by the New York Times and CBS News.

Natali strives to bring the thawing of permafrost and its adverse impacts to the public eye, and has done so through participation in interviews and speaking on public radio programs. She also works as a leader of the Polaris Project, which is an initiative to engage undergraduate students in research of Arctic permafrost. The project is funded by the National Science Foundation. Natali was also invited to speak at the 2015 United Nations Climate Change Conference about the importance of recognizing permafrost as a significant contributor to carbon emissions and climate change.

In 2024, Natali became a state and federal advisor after being hired by the Advisory Council for Climate Adaptation Science.

=== Major publications ===
These are some of Natali's most cited publications:

- Climate change and the permafrost carbon feedback (2015)
- Climate change: High risk of permafrost thaw (2011)
- Increased plant productivity in Alaskan tundra as a result of experimental warming of soil and permafrost (2012)
- Expert assessment of vulnerability of permafrost carbon to climate change (2013)
- Effects of experimental warming of air, soil and permafrost on carbon balance in Alaskan tundra (2011)
- Biomass offsets little or none of permafrost carbon release from soils, streams, and wildfire: an expert assessment (2016)
- Permafrost degradation stimulates carbon loss from experimentally warmed tundra (2014)

== Awards and fellowships ==
In 2006, Natali was awarded the Association for Women in Science Ruth Satter Predoctoral Award. From 2006 to 2007 she was granted a U.S. Department of Energy Global Change Education Program graduate fellowship. The National Science Foundation elected Natali as a graduate research fellow from 2004 to 2008, and as a Polar Programs Postdoctoral research fellow from 2010 to 2012. In 2025 Natali was awarded the American Geophysical Union's Joanne Simpson Medal that recognizes mid-career scientists for their contributions to Earth and space science.
