= Daniel Sigman =

American geoscientist

- Education: Stanford University, Massachusetts Institute of Technology
- Awards: Science Innovation Award Heinz A. Lowenstam medal; MacArthur Fellows Program
- Scientific career
- Fields: geoscience
- Workplaces: Princeton University
- Doctoral students: Nele Meckler

Daniel Sigman is an American geoscientist, and the Dusenbury Professor of Geological and Geophysical Sciences at Princeton University. Sigman received a MacArthur Foundation "genius grant" in 2009.

== Life ==
He graduated from Stanford University with a B.S. in 1991, and from the Massachusetts Institute of Technology /Woods Hole Oceanographic Institution’s Joint Program in Oceanography, with a Ph.D. in 1997.

He studies the global cycles of biologically active elements, in particular, nitrogen and carbon, and he is active in the development of analytical techniques for studying nitrogen in the environment. He also investigates the history of these cycles in order to understand the causes of past changes in the atmospheric concentration of carbon dioxide, the role of this greenhouse gas in the waxing and waning of ice ages, and the ocean’s response to climate change. He is now married and is a father of two.

== Awards ==
- 2012 Science Innovation Award Heinz A. Lowenstam medal co-recipient with Katherine Freeman for work in biogeochemistry
- 2009 MacArthur Fellows Program
- 2009 Blavatnik Award for Young Scientists
- 2004 Bessel Award of the Humboldt Foundation
- 2004 James B. Macelwane Medal
