= Eugen Seibold =

German research vessel

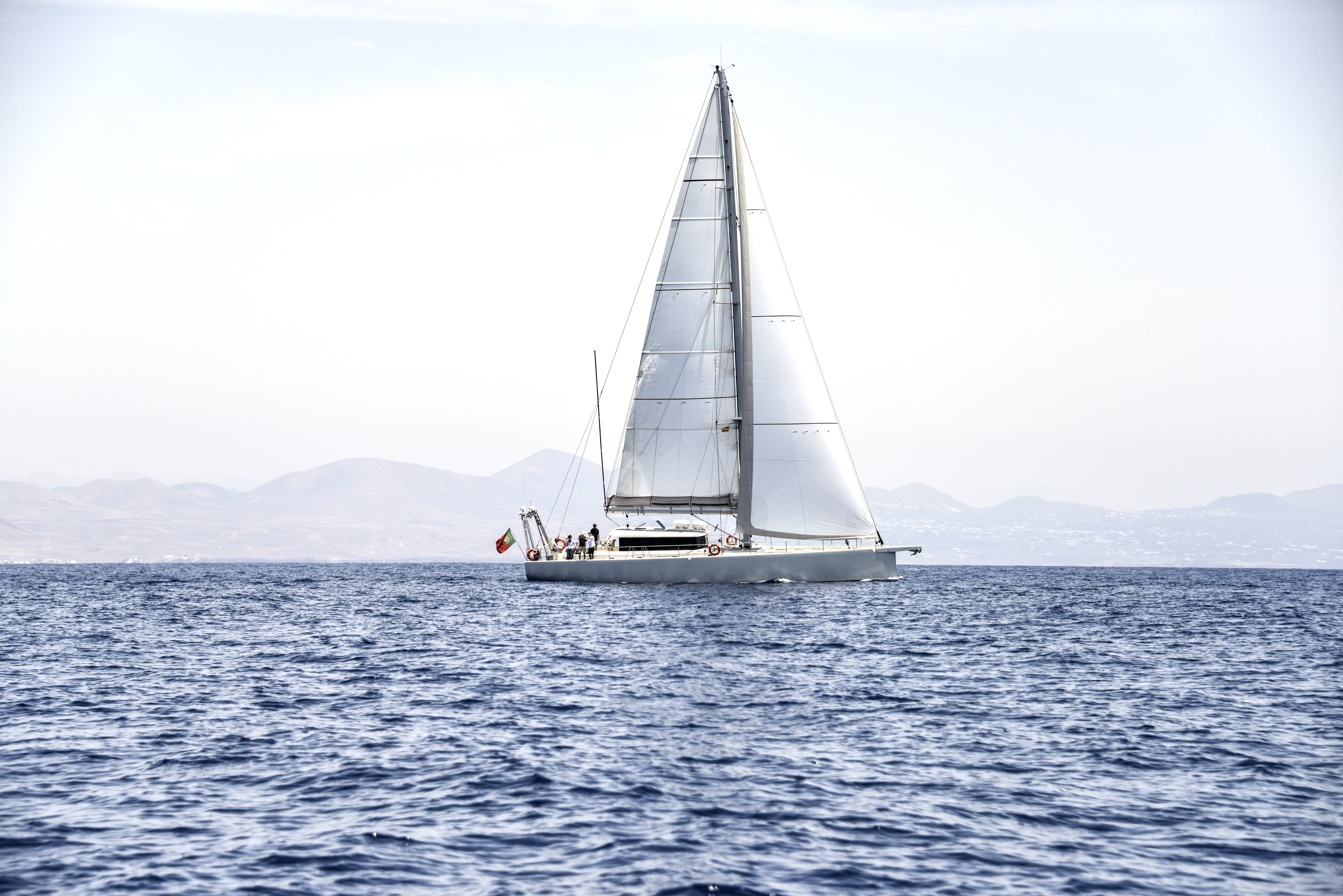

History
- Name: Eugen Seibold
- Owner: Max Planck Institute for Chemistry
- Builder: Michael Schmidt Yachtbau, Greifswald, Germany
- Laid down: 2017
- Launched: 11 May 2018
- Status: in service

General characteristics
- Type: research sailing yacht
- Length: 22 metres
- Beam: 6 metres
- Propulsion: sail and diesel

Eugen Seibold is a German research vessel designed for contamination-free sampling of seawater, plankton, and air. Starting from 2018, exchange processes between atmosphere and ocean are studied. The vessel has been funded by the Werner Siemens Foundation and is operated by the Max Planck Institute for Chemistry (MPI) in Mainz.

The vessel is named after Professor Eugen Seibold, a German marine geologist. Construction started in 2017 and the vessel was christened on 11 May 2018, the 100th anniversary of Seibold's birth.

== Research ==
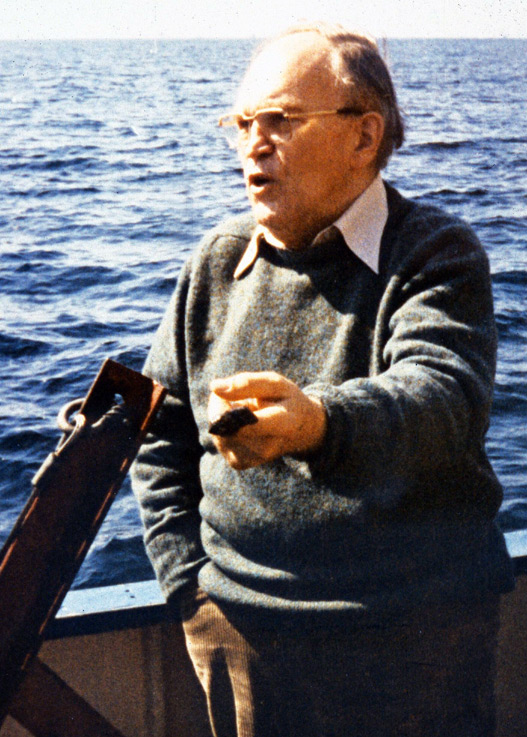
Eugen Seibold (1918–2013) on board Littorina, 1978

Eugen Seibold is designed for flexible and dynamic topical operations. Based on a long-term sampling schedule and sampling grid, targeted projects are being developed on short notice to capture events such as El Niño, dust storms, or large wildfires.

The design of the vessel with a glass fiber reinforced composite hull, and up to nine hours of battery mode autonomy, facilitates contamination-free sampling of seawater and air.

== Scientific equipment ==
The vessel has three laboratories to facilitate wet sampling and seawater analyses (starboard-side), on-line mass spectrometry, infrared spectrometry, flow cytometry, and analyses of air samples.

Seawater is constantly pumped from three meters water depth to the wet lab through a one-inch Teflon tube. A sampling chamber with a debubbler delivers the sampling water to various probes including temperature, salinity, chlorophyll, and other photosynthetic pigments, particle sizes, pH, CO_{2}, ocean color properties as well as analyses of microalgae and bacteria. This allows for the assessment of primary production in the surface ocean as well as biogeochemical cycling of nutrients and potential contaminants. Various filtration racks are used for the processing of discrete samples. Fume hood, clean bench, and freezers complement the wet lab. In the next-door half-dry lab, online CO_{2} isotope analyses and quantification of Ar/O_{2} as another measure of primary production are carried out.

The air lab of Eugen Seibold is equipped with instrumentation for the analysis of atmospheric aerosols, including particle number concentrations and size distributions, as well as soot abundance and its microphysical properties. Moreover, aerosol samples are collected on filters for subsequent laboratory analysis with a spectrum of different techniques. Air is sampled from about ten meters above the main deck.

The water column is sampled with a rosette water sampler equipped with an 8-channel CTD (recording conductivity, temperature, and pressure/depth), a large volume pump for in-situ filtration, bongo nets and a multinet, and a sediment trap. Photosynthetic active radiation (PAR) is also measured on the mast top and on top of the CTD together with temperature, salinity, pH, O_{2}, and fluorescence.

== Research objectives ==
Eugen Seibold is coordinated by the Climate Geochemistry department of MPI and its director Prof. (ETHZ) Dr. Gerald Haug. It investigates the role of the ocean on climate change. Physical, chemical, and biological parameters are sampled, measured, and calibrated for detailed analyses of the modern atmosphere and surface ocean to facilitate better reconstruction of the past ocean and climate.

The lower atmosphere and surface ocean are analyzed from the euphotic, light penetrated zone and the export layer down to 1000 meters water depth. Major chemical and biological exchange processes including degradation of organic matter take place in this so-called twilight zone. These processes have a significant effect on the turnover and distribution of greenhouse gasses such as carbon dioxide (CO_{2}) in the atmosphere and ocean. Abundance and properties of atmospheric aerosols in the continental outflow and remote ocean affect climate through the ocean-atmosphere exchange, marine clouds, and radiative forcing.

All main climate zones and marine provinces will be sampled over the following years; transects from the tropical to polar North Atlantic, extending into the Caribbean and the eastern Pacific are projected.

== Boat design ==
About half of the interior space of the 22-meter long and six meters wide (draught 3.5 meters) Explorer72-type vessel is used as laboratory. In total, eight berths can host four to six scientists and two to four crew members. A desalination plant, 1000 liters of fresh water, and 4000 liters of diesel allow up to three weeks of autonomy at sea. Lithium iron phosphate batteries, with a capacity of about 65 kWh, facilitate emission-free operation including navigation and scientific work of at least nine hours. Batteries are charged while sailing and in port. Propulsion at sea and in port is supported by a 210 hp diesel engine.

== Partners ==
The vessel's activities are coordinated by the Max Planck Institute for Chemistry in Mainz, Germany and maintained by the Max Planck Society, under the management of F. Laeisz Shipping. Construction of the yacht was supported by the Werner Siemens Foundation, Switzerland, with 3.5 million Euros.

Eugen Seibold's design is from Lorenzo Argento Yacht Design, Italy. The yacht was built by Michael Schmidt Yachtbau, Greifswald, Germany. Axthelm & Rolvien architects, Berlin, designed the yachts interior. A gearbox has been designed in cooperation with ZF, Friedrichshafen, Germany. In cooperation with Hydrobios, Kiel, the mechanical workshop of the MPIC built a light multinet from titanium.
