= Dorit Hammerling =

American environmental statistician and engineer

Dorit M. Hammerling is an Austrian and American environmental statistician and environmental engineer whose research applies spatial statistics and remote sensing to climate modeling and understanding the emissions and spatial distribution of greenhouse gases including carbon dioxide and methane. She is an associate professor in the Department of Applied Mathematics and Statistics at the Colorado School of Mines.

== Education and career ==
Hammerling earned a diploma (equivalent to a combined bachelor's and master's degree) in 2000, from the University of Natural Resources and Life Sciences, Vienna. After working as an engineer for Holcim, she continued her studies in statistics and engineering at the University of Michigan, where she completed her Ph.D. in environmental engineering in 2012. Her doctoral dissertation, Global Atmospheric CO2 Distributions from Satellite Observations, was supervised by Anna Michalak.

After postdoctoral research at the Statistical and Applied Mathematical Sciences Institute, she became the head of statistics in the Institute for Mathematics Applied to the Geosciences at the National Center for Atmospheric Research. She moved to the Colorado School of Mines as an associate professor in 2019.

== Recognition ==
Hammerling was a 2018 recipient of the Early Investigator Award of the American Statistical Association Section on Statistics and the Environment. She was elected as a Fellow of the American Statistical Association in 2026.
