= Anna Michalak =

American geophysicist

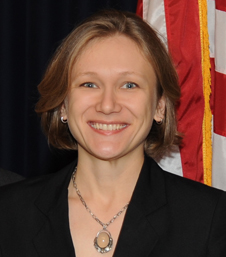
- Michalak in a 2008 NASA photo
- Education: University of Guelph; Stanford University
- Scientific career
- Workplaces: Carnegie Institution for Science; University of Michigan; National Oceanic and Atmospheric Administration
- Thesis: Application of Bayesian inference methods to inverse modeling for contaminant source identification. (2003)
- Doctoral students: Dorit Hammerling

Anna Michalak is an American geophysicist who is Director of the Department of Global Ecology at the Carnegie Institution for Science and a professor at Stanford University. Her research considers the cycling and emission of greenhouse gases. She is the lead author of the carbon cycle science plan, a comprehensive analysis of Earth's carbon stocks and flows. She was awarded the 2021 American Geophysical Union Joanne Simpson Medal.

== Early life and education ==
Michalak was an undergraduate student at the University of Guelph, where she majored in environmental engineering. She moved to Stanford University for graduate studies, where she earned both her master's and doctoral degrees.Her PhD research considered Bayesian inference methods to model contaminant sources.

In the early days of her scientific career, Michalak developed approaches to quantify greenhouse gas emissions. This allowed her to identify how climate change impacts plants' ability to store carbon. After graduating, Michalak joined the National Oceanic and Atmospheric Administration as a postdoctoral fellow in climate monitoring.

== Research and career ==
Michalak was appointed to the faculty at the University of Michigan. She joined the faculty at the Carnegie Institution for Science in 2011 and was made Director in 2020.

Michalak's research considers planet Earth's cycles of greenhouse gases and primarily makes use of atmospheric observations. She uses these observations to better inform climate models, for example her efforts show that during the growing season, farms in the Midwestern United States are removing considerably more carbon dioxide from the atmosphere than expected. Whilst drought dominates the research into carbon accounting, Michalak has shown that floods may be more important than droughts. This is because they suppress rates of photosynthesis, the process by which plants take up carbon dioxide from the atmosphere. She is interested in climate change and how humans have impacted fresh and coastal water quality. She has shown how changes in rainfall patterns can act to exacerbate harmful blooms of algae.

Michalak is committed climate policy and building a more robust scientific community. Michalak is the lead author of the U.S. Carbon Cycle Science Plan, which includes a detailed description of the carbon stocks and flows on planet Earth. The plan outlines a series of recommendations, including the needs to strengthen networks of observation to monitor and track carbon, develop numerical models to better predict future behaviour and train researchers to better communicate their findings with policy makers and the general public.

== Awards and honors ==
- American Geophysical Union Simpson Medal
- Leopold Leadership Fellow
- University of Michigan Henry Russel Lecturer
- Presidential Early Career Award for Scientists and Engineers

== Selected publications ==
- Anna M Michalak; Eric J Anderson; Dmitry Beletsky; et al. (1 April 2013). "Record-setting algal bloom in Lake Erie caused by agricultural and meteorological trends consistent with expected future conditions". Proceedings of the National Academy of Sciences of the United States of America. 110 (16): 6448–6452. Bibcode:2013PNAS..110.6448M. doi:10.1073/pnas.1216006110. ISSN 0027-8424. PMC 3631662. PMID 23576718. Wikidata Q30615145.
- Scot M Miller; Steven C Wofsy; Anna M Michalak; et al. (10 December 2013). "Anthropogenic emissions of methane in the United States". Proceedings of the National Academy of Sciences of the United States of America. 110 (50): 20018–22. Bibcode:2013PNAS..11020018M. doi:10.1073/pnas.1314392110. ISSN 0027-8424. PMC 3864315. PMID 24277804. Wikidata Q28661097.
- E Sinha; A M Michalak; V Balaji (1 July 2017). "Eutrophication will increase during the 21st century as a result of precipitation changes". Science. 357 (6349): 405–408. doi:10.1126/science.aan2409. ISSN 0036-8075. PMID 28751610. Wikidata Q38650677.
