= Jean Brenchley =

American microbiologist (1944–2019)

- Jean Brenchley as a high school student, from a 1962 newspaper.
- Born: Jean Elnora Brenchley; March 6, 1944; Towanda, Pennsylvania
- Died: July 9, 2019 (aged 75); State College, Pennsylvania
- Occupation: Microbiologist

Jean E. Brenchley (March 6, 1944 – July 9, 2019) was an American microbiologist and a professor at the Pennsylvania State University (Penn State) and Purdue University.

== Early life ==
Jean Elnora Brenchley was born in Towanda, Pennsylvania, as the daughter of J. Edward Brenchley and Elizabeth Jefferson Brenchley. "My love of microorganisms started while growing up on a small dairy farm in Pennsylvania" she recalled later in life. As a high school student in Canton, Pennsylvania, Brenchley won a regional science fair competition, with a project about the way Myxomycetes slime mold reacts to light.

Brenchley earned her bachelor's degree in biology at Mansfield University in 1965. She pursued further studies in marine microbiology at the Scripps Institute of Oceanography, where she earned her master's degree in 1967. She completed doctoral work at the University of California, Davis in 1970, with a dissertation titled "An Investigation of Cold-Sensitive Mutants of Salmonella typhimurium LT2 with altered macromolecular synthesis."

== Career ==
After a one-year post-doctoral appointment at the Massachusetts Institute of Technology, Brenchley joined the microbiology department at Penn State in 1971 as an assistant professor. In 1977 she moved to Purdue University, where she became a full professor in 1979. For four years- beginning in 1981, she worked in industrial research. She returned to academia in 1984, as the founding Director of the Penn State Biotechnology Institute. She built the institute's programming and did fundraising to create laboratories. Though she retired from the institute in 1990, she continued teaching at Penn State and retired as Professor Emerita in 2011.

Brenchley's research involved the genetics of psychrophilic microbes, including microbes retrieved from Antarctic and Greenland ice core samples. Her work had practical industrial applications (for example, for food safety at low temperatures), but was also considered useful in theories about extraterrestrial life.

In 1986, Brenchley was elected president of the American Society for Microbiology. She was recipient of the Waksman Award for Outstanding Contributions in Microbiology in 1985 from the Theobald Smith Society, and of American Society for Microbiology's Alice Evans Award in 1996, for her work encouraging women in the field. She was a fellow of the American Academy of Microbiology, the American Association for the Advancement of Science, and the Society for Industrial Microbiology.

TheBrenchley Endowment, established by Brenchley in her last year (2019), supports programming on WPSU-FM, the public radio station at Penn State. She wanted the fund to be used to ensure the continuation of "Morning Edition" and "Science Friday," two programs produced by NPR, that she said are her "longtime companions in daily life".

== Personal life ==
Brenchley married author Bernard Asbell in 1990. She was widowed when Asbell died in 2001. She died from cancer in 2019, aged 75 years, in State College, Pennsylvania. Some of her papers and awards are in the collection of the Bradford County Historical Society Museum. The Jean Brenchley Fund, established in her memory at the Centre Foundation, supports environmental and educational projects in central Pennsylvania, including the Women Anglers Support Fund, because she was active in the Central Pennsylvania Women Anglers.
