= Superphenalene =

- Chemical structure of superphenalene

Names
- Preferred IUPAC name Dibenzo[u′v′,a′_{1}b′_{1}]benzo[4′′,10′′]anthra[3′′,2′′,1′′,9′′,8′′:1′,12′,11′,10′]tetrapheno[5′,6′,7′,8′,9′:4,5,6,7]tetraceno[2,1,12,11,10,9-uvwxyza_{1}b_{1}]hexaceno[2,1,16,15,14,13,12,11-defghijklmno:3,4,5,6,7,8,9,10-d′e′f′g′h′i′j′k′l′m′n′o′]diheptacene

Identifiers
CAS Number	196505-76-7
3D model (JSmol)	Interactive image
ChemSpider	103879658
- InChI: InChI=1S/C96H30/c1-10-31-37-16-4-22-43-49-28-51-45-24-6-18-39-33-12-2-14-35-41-20-8-26-47-53-30-54-48-27-9-21-42-36-15-3-13-34-40-19-7-25-46-52-29-50-44-23-5-17-38-32(11-1)55(31)70-73(58(37)43)82-64(49)79-66(51)84-75(60(39)45)71(56(33)35)77(62(41)47)86-68(53)81-69(54)87-78(63(42)48)72(57(34)36)76(61(40)46)85-67(52)80-65(50)83(74(70)59(38)44)91(82)94-88(79)95(92(84)86)90(81)96(89(80)94)93(85)87/h1-30H Key: GJDYQJRSHRSMEZ-UHFFFAOYSA-N
- SMILES: C1=C2C3C4=C5C6=C7C8=C9C%10=C6C=3C3=C6C%11=C%12C(=CC=CC%12=C31)C1=CC=CC3=C1C%11=C1C%11C3=CC=CC=%11C3=CC%11C(=C%12C%13=C%14C(=CC=CC=%11%14)C%11=CC=CC%14=C%11C%13=C%11C%13C%14=CC=CC=%13C%13=CC%14C(=C5C5=C%15C(=CC=CC=%14%15)C%14=CC=CC%15=C%14C5=C4C4C%15=CC=CC2=4)C7=C%13C%11=C%128)C9=C3C1=C6%10

Properties
Chemical formula	C_{96}H_{30}
Molar mass	1183.296 g·mol^{−1}
- Except where otherwise noted, data are given for materials in their standard state (at 25 °C [77 °F], 100 kPa). Infobox references

Superphenalene is a very large, synthetic polycyclic aromatic hydrocarbon (PAH) with chemical formula C_{96}H_{30}. It can be formally considered to consist of three fused superbenzenes (hexa-peri-hexabenzocoronene).

It can be considered as an overlapping structure of three hexa-peri-hexabenzocoronenes arranged symmetrically around a center. These have also been known as building blocks of molecular electronics since 2004 as they form self-assembling columns and nanotubes.

It and its hexa-tert-butyl derivative were first prepared in 1997, along with a collection of other very large PAHs. Due to the low solubility of these compounds, they could only be characterized by mass spectrometry when they were first synthesized, as neither NMR nor UV-Vis data could be collected.

== Properties ==
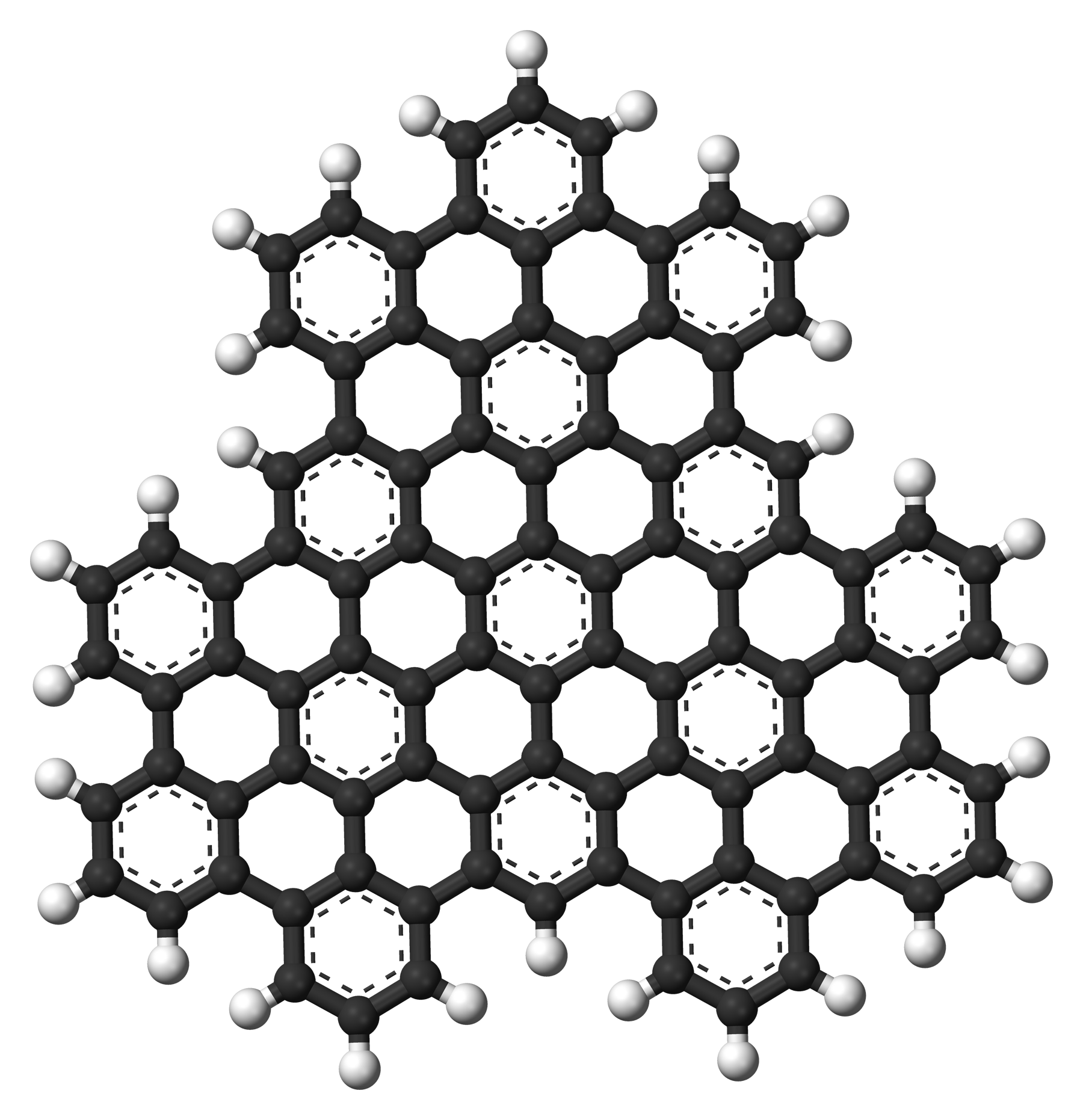
Planar geometry of superphenalene

Superphenalene has a planar geometry. With 540,000 mesomeric boundary structures, it has significantly more than hexabenzocoronene (250), supernaphthalene (16,100) and also buckminsterfullerene (12,500). The molecule has a threefold symmetry axis perpendicular to the molecule (C_{3}).
