= Sasha Reed =

American ecologist

- Education: University of Colorado Boulder
- Scientific career
- Thesis: Scaling from molecules to ecosystems: Controls over free-living nitrogen fixation in terrestrial ecosystems (2008)

Sasha C. Reed is an American ecologist known for her work on changes in terrestrial ecosystems. Reed was elected a fellow of the American Geophysical Union and the Ecological Society of America in 2024.

== Education and career ==
Reed received her bachelor's degree from Colgate University in 1997. In 2008 she earned her doctorate from the University of Colorado Boulder. She began working at the United States Geological Society in 2008, and as of 2023 she is the head of the Southwest Biological Science Center Terrestrial Drylands Ecology Branch at the United States Geological Survey.

== Research ==
Reed's early research examined the interactions between chemistry and nitrogen fixation in prairie ecosystems and tropical forests. She subsequently went on to examine how changes in rainfall alter the survival of moss in the Colorado Plateau, and how climate change alters the ability of the ground to absorb light. Her research has included investigations into the types of microorganisms that grow in desert soils.

== Awards and honors ==
In 2011 Reed received a Presidential Early Career Award for Scientists and Engineers. In 2024 Reed received the Joanne Simpson Medal and was elected a fellow of the American Geophysical Union. The Ecological Society of America elected her a fellow in 2024.

== Selected publications ==
- Reed, Sasha C.; Cleveland, Cory C.; Townsend, Alan R. (2011-12-01). "Functional Ecology of Free-Living Nitrogen Fixation: A Contemporary Perspective". Annual Review of Ecology, Evolution, and Systematics. 42 (1): 489–512. doi:10.1146/annurev-ecolsys-102710-145034. ISSN 1543-592X.
- Reed, Sasha C.; Townsend, Alan R.; Davidson, Eric A.; Cleveland, Cory C. (2012). "Stoichiometric patterns in foliar nutrient resorption across multiple scales". New Phytologist. 196 (1): 173–180. doi:10.1111/j.1469-8137.2012.04249.x. ISSN 0028-646X.
- Reed, Sasha C.; Coe, Kirsten K.; Sparks, Jed P.; Housman, David C.; Zelikova, Tamara J.; Belnap, Jayne (2012). "Changes to dryland rainfall result in rapid moss mortality and altered soil fertility". Nature Climate Change. 2 (10): 752–755. doi:10.1038/nclimate1596. ISSN 1758-678X.
- Delgado-Baquerizo, Manuel; Reich, Peter B.; Trivedi, Chanda; Eldridge, David J.; Abades, Sebastián; Alfaro, Fernando D.; Bastida, Felipe; Berhe, Asmeret A.; Cutler, Nick A.; Gallardo, Antonio; García-Velázquez, Laura; Hart, Stephen C.; Hayes, Patrick E.; He, Ji-Zheng; Hseu, Zeng-Yei; Hu, Hang-Wei; Kirchmair, Martin; Neuhauser, Sigrid; Pérez, Cecilia A.; Reed, Sasha C.; Santos, Fernanda; Sullivan, Benjamin W.; Trivedi, Pankaj; Wang, Jun-Tao; Weber-Grullon, Luis; Williams, Mark A.; Singh, Brajesh K. (2020-02-03). "Multiple elements of soil biodiversity drive ecosystem functions across biomes". Nature Ecology & Evolution. 4 (2): 210–220. doi:10.1038/s41559-019-1084-y. hdl:10919/98741. ISSN 2397-334X.
