= Yafang Cheng =

Chinese atmospheric scientist

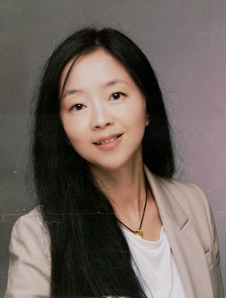
- Born: Wuhan, China
- Education: Peking University (Ph.D., 2007)
- Awards: Fellow of the American Geophysical Union, Member of Academia Europaea
- Scientific career
- Fields: Atmospheric science
- Institutions: Max Planck Institute for Chemistry, Peking University
- Website: https://www.mpic.de/3599133/Profile_Y_Cheng

Yafang Cheng is a Chinese geoscientist at the Max Planck Institute for Chemistry, in Mainz, Germany. She specialises in atmospheric chemistry and physics.

== Biography ==
She was born and grew up in Wuhan, China. She received a BSc in environmental science from Wuhan University and a PhD in environmental science from Peking University. In 2011, she became an assistant professor of atmospheric science at Peking University. In 2014, she was appointed as head of Minerva Independent Research Group "Aerosols, Air Quality & Climate" at the Max Planck Institute for Chemistry. She is also a guest professor at the Peking University and University of Science and Technology of China.

Cheng's work focuses on atmospheric aerosols and their impact on air quality, public health and climate. She has published in highly regarded scientific journals including Science, PNAS etc., and has been recognized as "Highly cited researcher" by Web of Science & Clarivate.

Cheng has been co-editor and senior editor of the Atmospheric Chemistry and Physics of European Geosciences Union. In January 2023, she was appointed editor-in-chief of Journal of Geophysical Research: Atmosphere of the American Geophysical Union.

In 2021, Cheng was elected a member of Academia Europaea, and in 2022, she became a fellow of the American Geophysical Union. In 2023, Cheng was elected as a Fellow of the American Association for the Advancement of Science.

Selected awards and honors

- 2022 Joanne Simpson Medal, American Geophysical Union (AGU)
- 2021 Science Breakthroughs of the Year 2021 in Physical Sciences, Falling Walls Foundation
- 2020 Atmospheric Science Ascent Award, American Geophysical Union (AGU)
- 2020 Schmauss Award, German Association for Aerosol Research (GAef)
