= Bala Chaudhary =

American soil ecologist

Academic background
- Education: BA, Biological Sciences, 1999, University of Chicago; MS, PhD, Biological Sciences, 2010, Northern Arizona University
- Doctoral advisor: Nancy C. Johnson
- Website: https://balachaudhary.com/index.html

Bala Chaudhary is an American soil ecologist. She is an Associate Professor of Environmental Studies at Dartmouth College.

== Early life and education ==
Chaudhary grew up in Minnesota, spending much of her childhood outdoors. She was intrigued by ecology courses in college and developed an interest in mycorrhizal fungi after taking a course about symbiotic relationships at the Field Museum in Chicago. During college, she worked as a field assistant on a mycorrhizal ecology project in Chicago. Chaudhary received her bachelor’s degree in biological sciences at the University of Chicago in 1999.

After her undergraduate degree, Chaudhary worked in California as a restoration consultant in the early 2000s. Her responsibilities included restoring damaged landscapes for endangered species habitats. Soil microbes were a constant issue in restoration, inspiring her to pursue plant-microbe interactions in graduate school. She earned her master’s and doctorate degrees in biological sciences at Northern Arizona University under the mentorship of Nancy C. Johnson.

== Career ==
Chaudhary was an assistant professor in the College of Science and Health at DePaul University from 2016 to 2021. Since 2021, she has been an associate professor of Environmental Studies at Dartmouth College.

Chaudhary studies mycorrhizae, fungi that form symbiotic relationships with plants. Mycorrhizae provide plant roots with nutrients such as nitrogen and phosphorus, and they receive sugars in return. Chaudhary specifically focuses on the dispersal of arbuscular mycorrhizal (AM) fungi. She studies AM wind dispersal across long distances, an area of biogeography research that could have implications for agriculture and ecosystem restoration. Using rooftop dust collectors, her lab has found that spore dispersal was greater during times of heightened agricultural activity, suggesting a human influence on dispersal. She is currently expanding this research by collecting data from dust collectors installed at National Ecological Observatory Network (NEON) sites across the U.S.

In 2019, Chaudhary received the National Science Foundation (NSF) CAREER Award to support her research on the dispersal of mycorrhizal fungi: “Linking macroecology and traits to predict mycorrhizal fungal dispersal.” The grant also included educational components, such as funding the development of a course in which students use NEON data to conduct projects.

=== Inclusion in STEM ===
Another area of Chaudhary’s research investigates barriers to inclusion that students of color face in STEM fields. Her research with social scientist Tania Schussler has found that there are more challenges with retention, rather than recruitment, of students of color in ecology and environmental science. In 2020, she wrote a paper titled “Ten simple rules for building an anti-racist lab” with Asmeret Asefaw Berhe at the University of California, Merced. These rules include ensuring safety plans that address racism are in place for field work, collaborating with BIPOC academics, and making sure diversity and inclusion efforts are enforced throughout all positions of power within labs.

In 2020, Chaudhary created Women of Color in EEB, an online community for women of color and nonbinary people of color in the fields of ecology and evolutionary biology. Beginning as a Slack channel, WOC in EEB has since grown into a community supporting mentorship programs, conversations about research experiences, and job sharing. With Lily Khadempour, an assistant professor at Rutgers University-Newark, Chaudhary was awarded a grant from NSF to expand the one-on-one and group mentorship programs and organize a conference. The WOC in EEB conference was held from July 25 to July 27, 2023, at Dartmouth College.

Chaudhary wrote a commentary in Nature Microbiology in March 2022 about the complexities of marital name changes for female scientists. She suggested that automatic name changes on past publications should be in place, ensuring that a scientist’s entire body of work is represented under the name they choose.
