= Max Planck Institute for Polymer Research =

German research institute

Coordinates: 49°59′22″N 8°13′47″E

- Official logo
- Abbreviation: MPIP
- Formation: 1983; 43 years ago
- Type: Scientific institute
- Purpose: Research in polymers
- Headquarters: Mainz, Rhineland-Palatinate, Germany
- Key people: Erhard W. Fischer & Gerhard Wegner, founders
- Parent organization: Max Planck Society
- Website: (in English)

The Max Planck Institute for Polymer Research (German: Max-Planck-Institut für Polymerforschung) is a scientific center in the field of polymer science located in Mainz, Germany. The institute was founded in 1983 by Erhard W. Fischer and Gerhard Wegner. Belonging to the Chemistry, Physics and Technology Section, it is one of over 80 institutes in the Max Planck Society (Max-Planck-Gesellschaft).

== Research ==
Using a basic research approach, its scientists strive to design and characterize innovative applications in the fields of electronics, energy technology, medicine and nanomaterials. The institute specializes in new approaches to synthesis, supramolecular architectures, developing new methods, functional materials and components, structure and dynamics and surfaces and interfaces.

== Organization ==
The beginning of 2014 saw 511 people working at the institute, of whom 134 were supported by third-party funding and 79 were privately sponsored. The workforce was made up of 123 scientists, 150 doctoral and diploma students, 41 visiting scientists and 164 technical, administrative and auxiliary staff, altogether from approximately 40 countries.

=== Departments ===
The MPIP consists of seven departments each managed by a director:

- Molecular Electronics, Paul Blom
- Molecular Spectroscopy, Mischa Bonn
- Physics of Interfaces, Hans-Jürgen Butt
- Biomolecular Mechanics, Frauke Gräter
- Physical Chemistry of Polymers, Katharina Landfester
- Synthesis of Macromolecules, Tanja Weil
- Machine Learning Molecular Dynamics, Gábor Csányi

=== Emeriti and former directors ===
Emeriti

- Kurt Kremer, Director, Polymer Theory
- Hans-Wolfgang Spiess, Director, Polymer Spectroscopy (1985-2012)
- Gerhard Wegner, Director, Solid State Chemistry (1983-2008)

Former Directors

- Erhard E. Fischer, Director, Polymer Physics (1983-1997)
- Wolfgang Knoll, Director, Material Science (1993-2008)

=== Independent research groups ===
- X-Ray Scattering of Soft Matter, Katrin Amann-Winkel
- Theoretical Spectroscopy, Daniel Keefer, ERC Starting Grant
- Organic Bioelectronics, Ulrike Kraft, Lise Meitner Group
- Data-driven Analysis for Soft Matter Systems, Oleksandra Kukharenko

== Graduate programs ==
The International Max Planck Research School for Polymer Materials is a graduate program offering a doctorate degree. The school is run in cooperation with the Johannes Gutenberg University of Mainz.

The Max Planck Graduate Center (MPGC) is a virtual department across the MPIP, the Max Planck Institute for Chemistry, and four faculties of the Johannes Gutenberg University of Mainz, created for interdisciplinary projects. It offers a PhD program in these research topics to candidates from all over the world.
