= Pressure experiment =

Pressure experiments are experiments performed at pressures lower or higher than atmospheric pressure, called low-pressure experiments and high-pressure experiments, respectively. Pressure experiment are necessary because substances behave differently at different pressures. For example, water boils at a lower temperature at lower pressures. The equipment used for pressure experiments depends on whether the pressure is to be increased or decreased and by how much. A vacuum pump is used to remove the air out of a vacuum vessel for low-pressure experiments. High-pressures can be created with a piston-cylinder apparatus, up to 5 GPa (50 000 bar) and ~2000 °C. The piston is shifted with hydraulics, decreasing the volume inside the confining cylinder and increasing the pressure. For higher pressures, up to 25 GPa, a multi-anvil cell is used and for even higher pressures the diamond anvil cell. The diamond anvil cell is used to create extremely high pressures, as much as a million atmospheres (101 GPa), though only over a small area. The current record is 560 GPa, but the sample size is confined to the order of tens of micrometres (10^{−5} m).

== See also ==
- Orders of magnitude (pressure)
