= Charles Weir =

Charles Weir may refer to:

- Charles Weir (cricketer) (1874–1955), South African cricketer
- Charles E. Weir (1911–1987), American chemist and physicist
- Charlie Weir (1956–1992), South African boxer
- Guillotine Gordon (Charles Weir, born 1935), American professional wrestler
- Charles E. Weir (artist), American artist who painted The Wood Sawyer
