= Elizabeth Cottrell =

American geologist and curator (born 1975)

- Born: 1975 (age 50–51)
- Other name: Elizabeth Stevenson (legal)
- Education: Brown University (BS); Columbia University (PhD)
- Scientific career
- Fields: Geochemistry; mineralogy; volcanology
- Institutions: National Museum of Natural History, Smithsonian Institution
- Website: naturalhistory.si.edu

Elizabeth Stevenson (professionally Elizabeth Cottrell; born 1975) is a geologist and museum curator for the National Museum of Natural History (NMNH). She is a fellow of both the Geochemical Society and the Mineralogical Society of America, and formerly directed the Smithsonian's Global Volcanism Program.

== Early life and education ==
Born in 1975, Cottrell grew up in northern Vermont. Her father was an engineer. In 1997, Cottrell received a Bachelor of Science degree in geochemistry from Brown University. She received a Fulbright Fellowship to Paris, France, in 1998.

Cottrell went on to earn a Ph.D. in petrology from Columbia University in 2004, where she was affiliated with the Lamont–Doherty Earth Observatory. Her thesis was entitled Differentiation of the Earth from the Bottom Up: Core, Lithosphere, and Crust. From 2005 to 2006, she was a postdoctoral fellow at the Carnegie Institution for Science.

== Career and research ==
Since 2006, Cottrell has worked as a research geologist at the National Museum of Natural History in Washington, D.C., part of the Smithsonian Institution. Her research is geographically focused on Alaska and the region of Oceania. From 2010 to 2016, Cottrell was the director of the Global Volcanism Program. She is known for her work in the geologic fields of mineralogy and volcanism. Her geologic research focuses on the evolution of Earth's interior over geologic time, with a focus on the oxygen cycle, including studies into how continental drift contributes to oxidation of deep Earth layers. In 2013, Cottrell was the lead author of a study that found a correlation between iron-oxidation states of magma samples and ratios of radiogenic isotopes in the samples.

In 2015, Cottrell partook in a research expedition to the Aleutian Islands of Alaska to study "continental crust compositions in the absence of pre-existing continental crust". The research team also collected tephra from the Aleutians for research. Cottrell was elected a fellow of the Mineralogical Society of America in 2016.

Since 2017, she has served as the curator-in-charge of the National Rock and Ore Collections at the NMNH. At the museum, she simulates the formation of rocks under mechanical heat and pressure and uses the resource of extensive collections to compare, using spectroscopy and other methods, her experimental samples to those collected in various locations.

In 2019, Cottrell was a visiting scientist to ClerVolc, a volcano research consortium sponsored by the Université Clermont Auvergne. She started a three-year term on the board of the Geochemical Society that year.

Cottrell was a co-author in 2020 of an article describing the behavior of carbon during Earth's formation. The research has been applied in efforts to estimate the amount of carbon stored in the planet's core.

Cottrell is often featured in the Smithsonian Institution's Smithsonian magazine as a geology expert. She has also appeared in other Smithsonian Institution publications and media posts. She was the host of the second season of The Doctor Is In, a video series produced by the National Museum of Natural History in 2020. Cottrell was interviewed by BBC Future in 2022 for her perspective on volcanic monitoring and activity predictions. She has also appeared in multiple Science Friday segments.

Cottrell has been, since 2022, the chair of the museum's Department of Mineral Sciences. She is also an adjunct professor in the geology department at the University of Maryland. In 2023, Cottrell was named a fellow of the Geochemical Society and the European Association of Geochemistry.

In 2023, Cottrell was co-author of a publication that disputed the prevailing notion that the iron-depleted and oxidized geochemistry of continental crust came from crystallization of garnet. Cottrell's paper reported that they tested rock samples under pressure from piston-cylinder presses to simulate conditions inside Earth, and the results did not match the expected garnet composition. They argue instead that oxidized sulfur contributes to Earth's continents sitting above sea level, leading to a new theory "that oxidized sulfur could be oxidizing the iron".
