= Griggs apparatus =

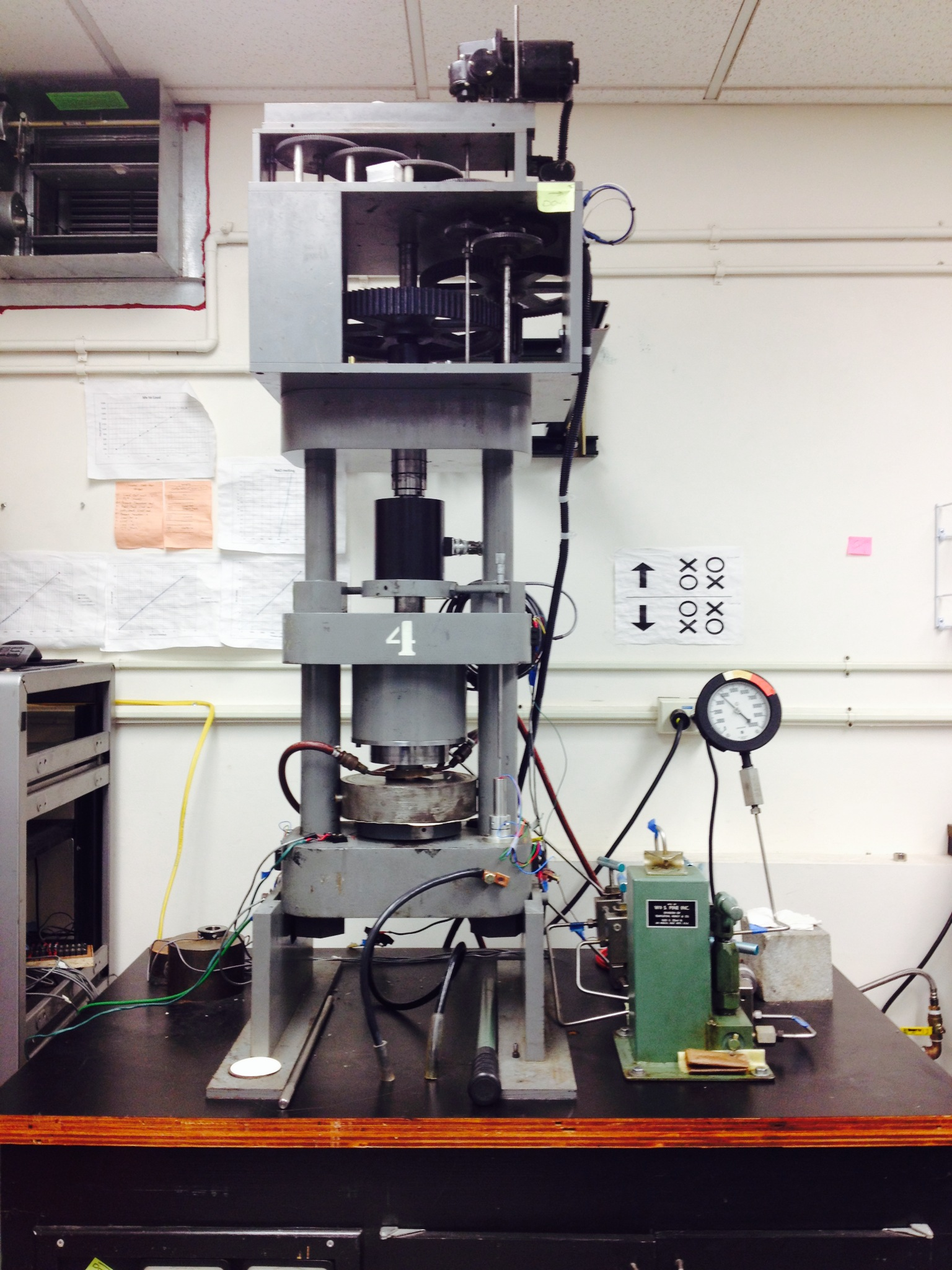
Example of Modified Griggs apparatus located at the University of Nevada Las Vegas

Griggs apparatus, also referred to as a Griggs rig, is a modified piston cylinder high pressure apparatus used to create an environment of high pressure, high temperature and to impart a deviatoric stress on a sample of material. It was conceived in the 1960s.

Sample sizes range depending on the specific Griggs apparatus but generally can be up to approximately 150 mm3, and temperatures of up to 1600 K along with pressures of approximately 3 GPa can be achieved.

== History ==
The Griggs apparatus was conceived by David Griggs in the mid 1960s during his time at the University of California at Los Angeles (UCLA). Since the inception of the Griggs apparatus it has become the work horse of many rock deformation labs world-wide, and has also helped elucidate numerous facets of plastic deformation in crystalline materials including the hydrolytic weakening of quartz.

== Theory ==
The Griggs machine utilizes the same principle that other high pressure apparatuses (such as the diamond anvil cell) use to create elevated pressure on a specimen.

By generating a nominal force, in the case of the Griggs machine through a hydraulic ram, a greater force can then be applied to the sample by decreasing the area of subsequent pistons in series with the ram and in contact with the sample.

== Sample assembly ==
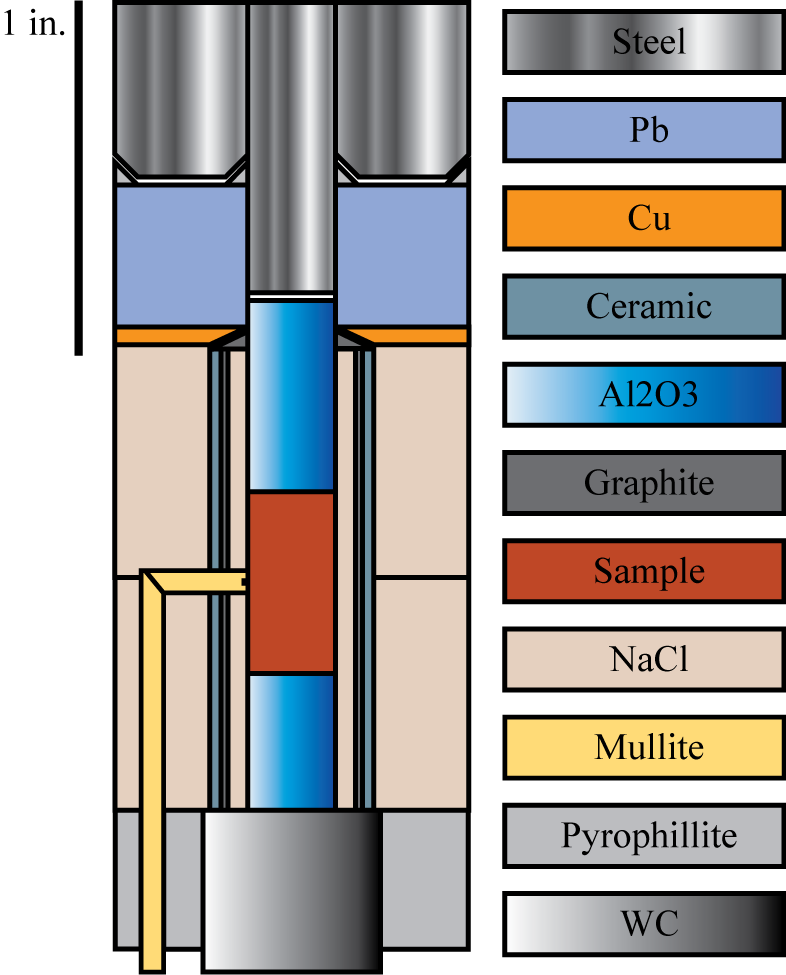
Example of one experimental sample assembly for a Griggs machine

The sample assembly is constructed of multiple cylindrical sleeves which are placed in the opening in the pressure vessel or “bomb”. The outermost sleeve is typically composed from NaCl which is used to transfer the vertical load applied from the steel piston into a confining pressure on the sample at the center of the assembly. NaCl is used since it is relatively weak and it assists in the transfer of stress. Directly inboard of the outer NaCl sleeve is a ceramic support sleeve with a graphite sleeve inside of it, which is used for resistive heating of the sample. The inner most sleeve which houses the sample along with the upper and lower alumina pistons, is commonly also composed of NaCl. In addition to this arrangement, the inner sleeve can also be composed of a ternary eutectic salt mixture which is called a molten salt cell. The advantage to the molten salt cell is the salt mixture melts at moderate temperatures which allows for a true hydrostatic pressure to be applied the sample. When using a molten salt cell it also becomes necessary to add an additional nickel capsule to contain the salt mixture in order to prevent damage to other parts of the sample assembly. Temperature is monitored by a side entry thermocouple(s) that penetrate the wall of the graphite furnace and are directly adjacent to the sample, and are typically threaded through protective mullite insulation. The deviatoric stress is transferred to the sample through the σ1 piston. This piston is orientated in series with the upper piston, sample and lower piston within the inner sleeve which all sits on top of a tungsten carbide bottom piston.

== Design ==
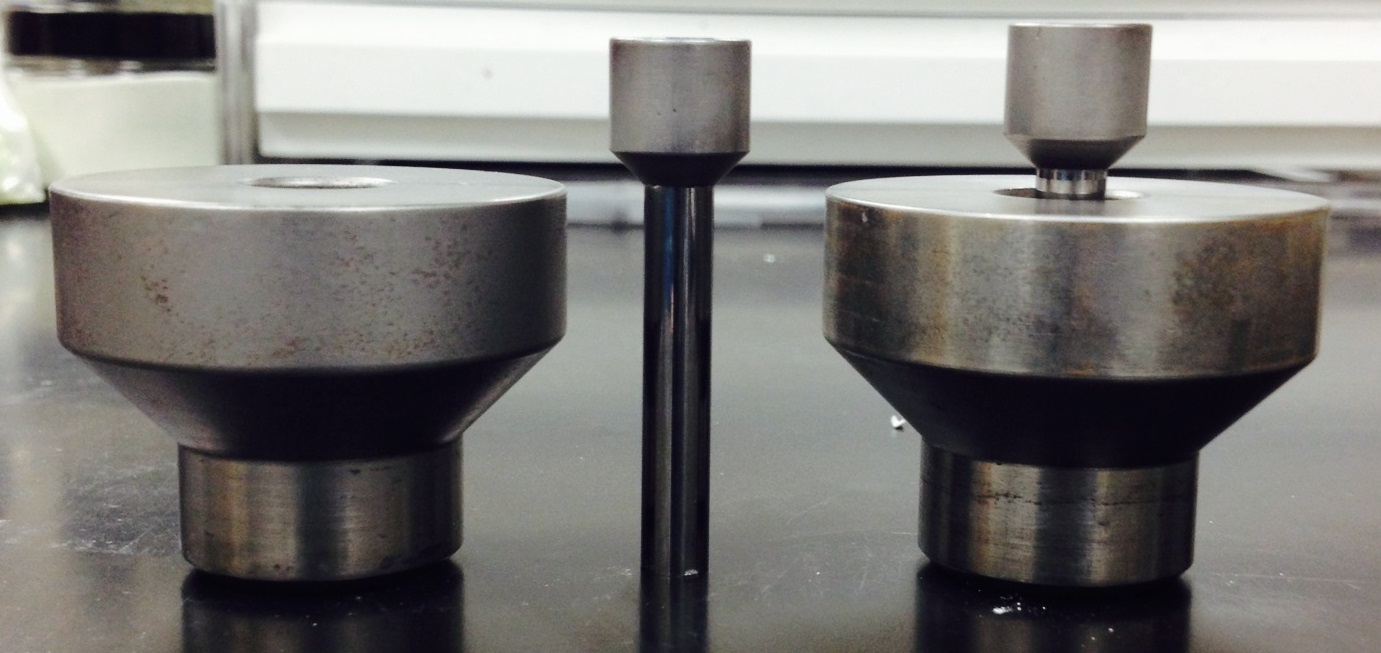
Expanded view of the outer (σ3) and inner (σ1) pistons.

A Griggs apparatus has the ability to create and maintain confining pressure on a sample while separately being able to strain the sample. Confining pressure is generated by advancing a hydraulic ram either by using a hand-operated lever pump or a servo-controlled syringe pump. The advancing ram then compresses the outer tungsten carbide piston (σ3) that in turn depresses the Pb plug at the top of the sample assembly and then in turn stresses the NaCl pressure medium. Deviatoric stress is created by a mechanical drive train that is powered by an electric motor that sits on top of the apparatus. When the electric motor is powered it engages with a set of gears that allow for variable strain rates to be chosen that range from 10^{−3}sec-1 down to 10^{−8}sec-1.

To eliminate the torque from the advancing drive train produced by the gear set, a recirculating ball screw is located in between the gear set and deformation piston (σ1) that provides the axial load. Connected in series with the deformation piston is also an external load cell which measures the load applied to the inner (σ1). The outer (σ3) and inner (σ1) pistons that sit above the sample are two separate pieces, this allows for the advancement of the deformation piston with the drive train without altering the confining pressure which is operated with the hydraulic ram.

The design of the hydraulic ram produces an error in pressure measurements that are calculated from utilizing the oil pressure within the ram. Inside of the ram there is a large O-ring that seals oil in either the upper or lower portion of the ram. As the ram is pressurized and oil is transferred from the lower reservoir to the upper friction is produced by the motion of the O-ring along the inside wall of the ram. Since the ram needs to overcome the force of the friction to continue advancing, pressure measurements calculated using the oil pressure within the ram includes a contribution from the internal friction. The contribution of frictional force on pressure calculations can be described by the following relationship:

Calculated pressure = Confining pressure + Internal friction within the ram.

The total contribution of this friction to the value of measured pressure is different for each specific Griggs machine, but it has been shown that deviations between actual and measured pressure can be up to 10%.

== See also ==
- Piston-cylinder apparatus

== Additional sources ==
- Griggs, David (1936). "Deformation of rocks under high confining pressure: 1. Experiments at room temperature". The Journal of Geology. 44 (5): 541–577. Bibcode:1936JG.....44..541G. doi:10.1086/624455. S2CID 129922915.
- Holyoke III, Caleb; A Kronenberg (2010). "Accurate differential stress measurement using the molten salt cell and solid salt assemblies in the Griggs apparatus with applications to strength, piezometers and rheology". Tectonophysics. 494 (1–2): 17–31. Bibcode:2010Tectp.494...17H. doi:10.1016/j.tecto.2010.08.001.
