= Charles E. Weir =

American chemist and physicist

Charles E. Weir (September 29, 1911–April 4, 1987) was an American chemist and physicist known for being one of the four co-inventors of the diamond anvil cell at the National Bureau of Standards in 1957, with Alvin Van Valkenburg, Ellis Lippincott and Elmer Bunting. Weir had the principal role in designing the first diamond anvil cell, and built it by hand using the machining tools available in his lab. The original device was first described in a paper on high-pressure infrared absorption measurements of calcium carbonate. Later, Weir collaborated in the development of diamond anvil cells for powder and single-crystal X-ray diffraction.

== Early life and education ==
Weir was born in Washington, DC in 1911 and attended Dunbar High School (Washington, D.C.), where he graduated first in his class in 1929. That same year, Weir was chosen by Oscar Stanton De Priest as one of four nominees for the US Naval Academy in Annapolis, where he passed the entrance exam, but failed the vision test. He instead attended the University of Chicago, where he obtained a B.S. in chemistry in 1932. Weir then obtained an M.S. in physical chemistry at Howard University, taught there for a few years, and went to Caltech in 1937 to pursue a Ph.D. in physics. He withdrew in 1940 due to illness, and began his career at the National Bureau of Standards in 1943.

== Career ==
Shortly before he began working on the development of the diamond anvil cell, Weir worked in the Leather Section at the National Bureau of Standards, where he developed a piston/cylinder device for high pressure experiments on leather and similar materials. He then used this device for unfunded discretionary work on the compressibility of (and phase transitions in) many other materials. Ultimately, this discretionary work brought him into contact with Alvin Van Valkenburg (a mineralogist by training), who was also pursuing high-pressure research at the National Bureau of Standards, along with Ellis Lippincott from the University of Maryland, College Park and Elmer Bunting from the National Bureau of Standards. After a failed experiment that involved compressing a sample with a diamond piston inserted into a cylindrical hole bored into a 7.5 carat diamond crystal, Weir proposed an opposed anvil device that would take advantage of the high compressive strength of diamond (as opposed to its less impressive tensile strength) to perform infrared absorption measurements at high pressure. In 1958, Weir took the lead role in designing the first diamond anvil cell, and fabricated it himself using the tools available to him in the laboratory.

== Later life and death ==
Charles Weir retired from the National Bureau of Standards in 1970 and later moved to San Luis Obispo, California. He died on April 4, 1987.
