= Richard C. Lord =

American chemist

- Born: October 10, 1910
- Died: April 29, 1989 (aged 78)
- Scientific career
- Fields: Physics

Richard C. Lord (1910–1989) was an American chemist best known for his work in the field of spectroscopy.

== Academic career ==
Richard Collins Lord was born in Louisville, Kentucky on October 10, 1910. He received his Ph.D. in physical chemistry from Johns Hopkins University in 1936. He spent two years, from 1936 to 1938, as a Fellow of the United States National Research Council, first at the University of Michigan and then at the University of Copenhagen, Denmark.

In 1942, Lord began work at Massachusetts Institute of Technology (MIT) when the National Defense Research Committee called him to serve as a technical aide and later as deputy chief in the Committee's optics division. During World War II, he was involved in the development of guided missiles as well as with military applications of infrared radiation.

In 1946, MIT appointed him Director of the Spectroscopy Laboratory and in 1954, Professor of Chemistry. In collaboration with George R. Harrison and J.R. Loofbourow, Lord published the widely used text Practical Spectroscopy in 1948.

Lord is considered a pioneer in the use of infrared radiation for the study of molecular structure. He is widely recognized for developments in the interpretation of infrared spectra of molecules in terms of their vibrational motion. He also contributed to the understanding of the cohesion of molecules by means of hydrogen bonding. His studies of the laser Raman spectroscopy of proteins and nucleic acids opened a new field of research.

== Awards and non-academic positions ==
Lord was awarded the President's Certificate of Merit in 1948 by Harry S. Truman in recognition of his work during WWII.

From 1957 to 1961, he served as a member and president of the Commission of Molecular Spectroscopy of the International Union of Pure and Applied Chemistry (IUPAC), and during 1964 was president of the Optical Society of America.

In 1966, he received the Award in Spectroscopy from the Pittsburgh Spectroscopy Society, and in 1967, he was made an honorary member of the Society of Applied Spectroscopy.

In 1976, he was awarded the Ellis R. Lippincott Award sponsored by the Optical Society, the Coblentz Society and the Society for Applied Spectroscopy in honor of Ellis R. Lippincott, one of Lord's early post-doctoral students.

Lord served as a consultant to the Central Research Department of DuPont between 1948 and 1980, and as editor in the field of optics for the McGraw-Hill Encyclopedia of Science & Technology. He was a fellow of the American Academy of Arts and Sciences.

He died on April 29, 1989.

== See also ==
- Optical Society of America#Past Presidents of the OSA
