= Genre art =

Art genre that depicts scenes from everyday life

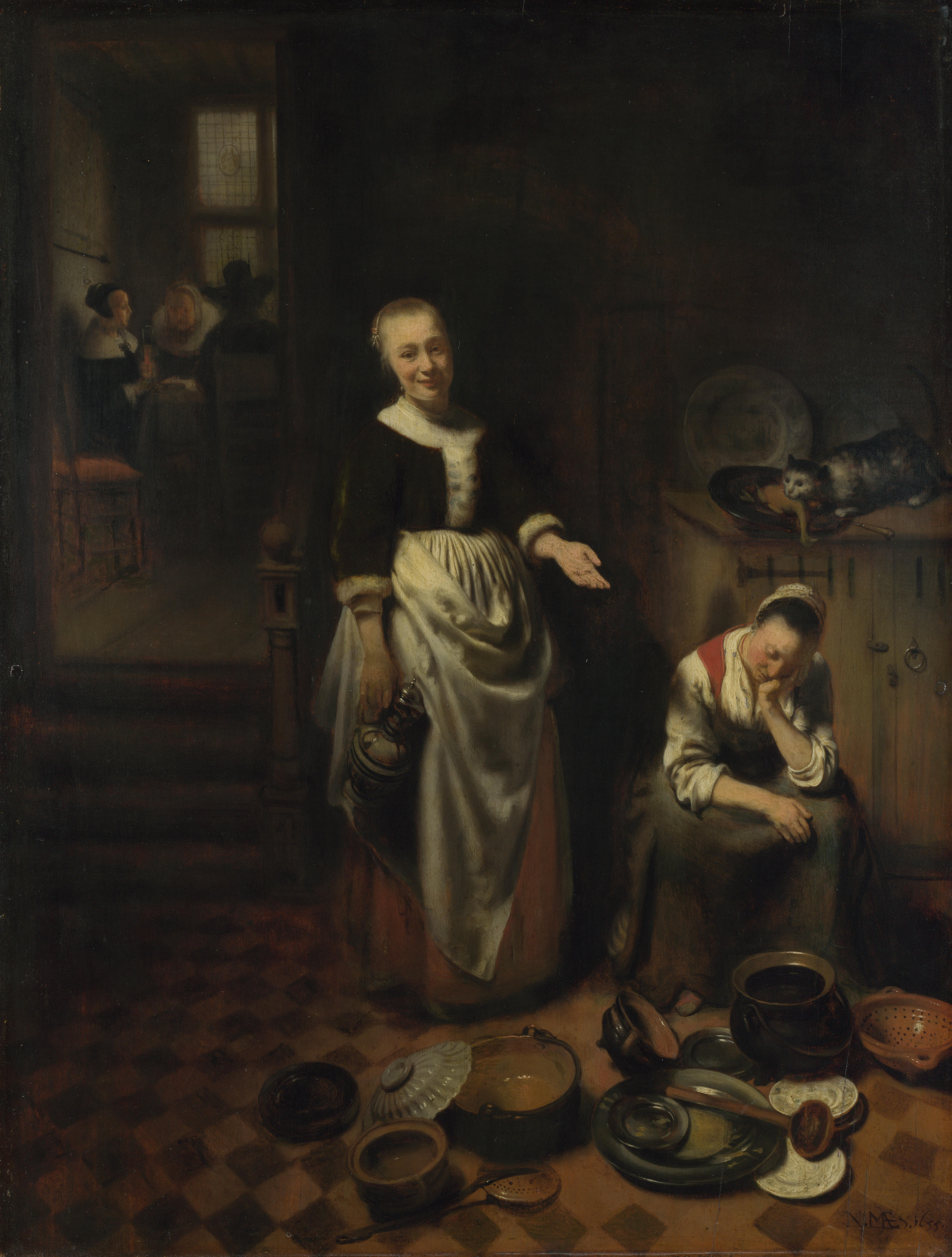
The Idle Servant; housemaid troubles were the subject of several of Nicolaes Maes' works.

Genre art is the pictorial representation in any of various media of scenes or events from everyday life, such as markets, domestic settings, interiors, parties, inn scenes, work, and street scenes. Such representations (also called genre works, genre scenes, or genre views) may be realistic, imagined, or romanticized by the artist. Some variations of the term genre art specify the medium or type of visual work, as in genre painting, genre prints, genre photographs, and so on.

The following concentrates on painting, but genre motifs were also extremely popular in many forms of the decorative arts, especially from the Rococo of the early 18th century onwards. Single figures or small groups decorated a huge variety of objects such as porcelain, furniture, wallpaper, and textiles.

== Genre painting ==
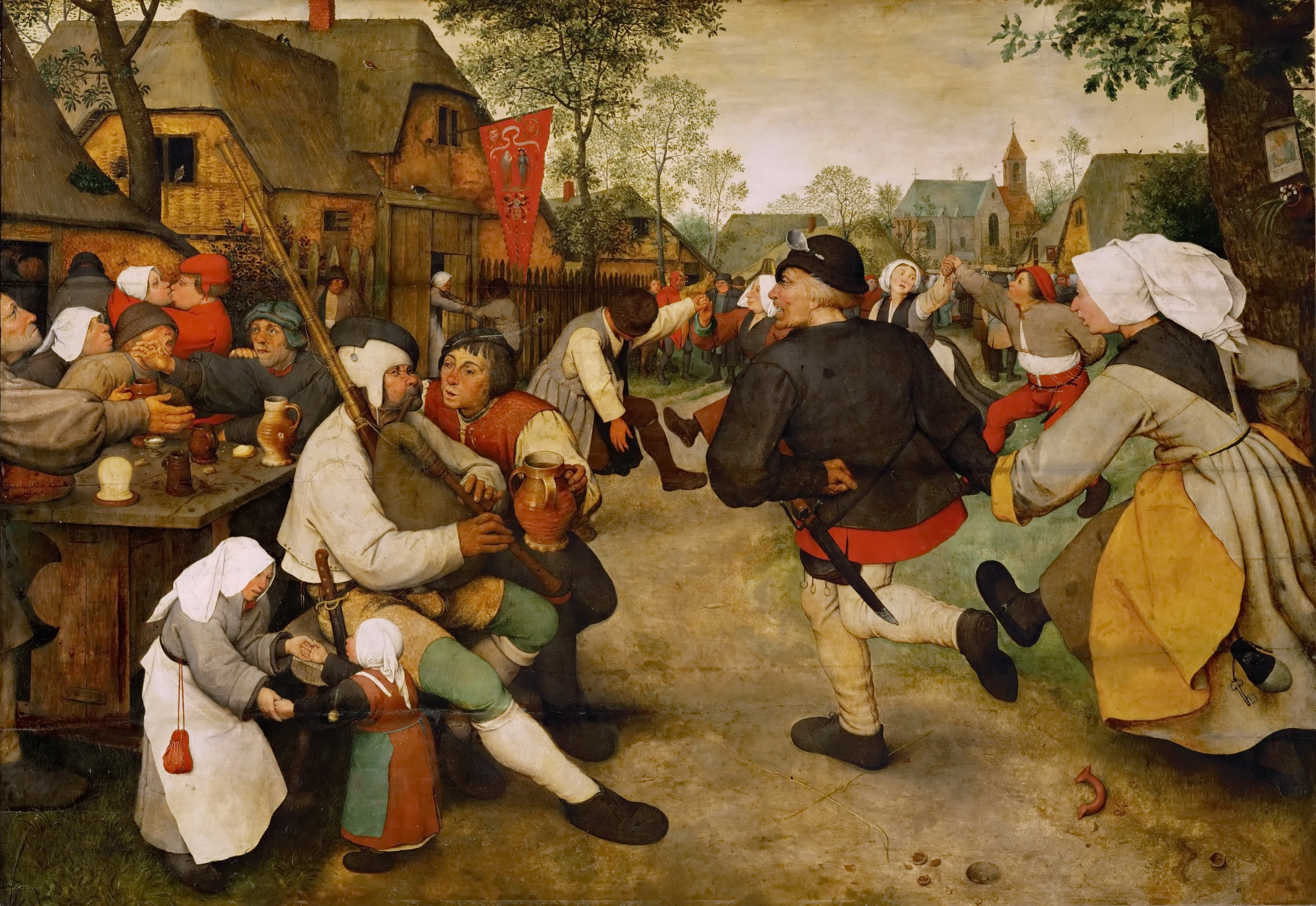
Peasant Dance, c. 1568, oil on wood, by Pieter Brueghel the Elder

Genre painting, also called genre scene or petit genre, depicts aspects of everyday life by portraying ordinary people engaged in common activities. One common definition of a genre scene is that it shows figures to whom no identity can be attached either individually or collectively—thus distinguishing petit genre from history paintings (also called grand genre) and portraits. A work would often be considered as a genre work even if it could be shown that the artist had used a known person—a member of his family, say—as a model. In this case it would depend on whether the work was likely to have been intended by the artist to be perceived as a portrait—sometimes a subjective question. The depictions can be realistic, imagined, or romanticized by the artist. Because of their familiar and frequently sentimental subject matter, genre paintings have often proven popular with the bourgeoisie, or middle class. Genre themes appear in nearly all art traditions. Painted decorations in ancient Egyptian tombs often depict banquets, recreation, and agrarian scenes, and Peiraikos is mentioned by Pliny the Elder as a Hellenistic panel painter of "low" subjects, such as survive in mosaic versions and provincial wall-paintings at Pompeii: "barbers' shops, cobblers' stalls, asses, eatables and similar subjects". Medieval illuminated manuscripts often illustrated scenes of everyday peasant life, especially in the Labours of the Months in the calendar section of books of hours, most famously Les Tres Riches Heures du Duc de Berry.

=== To 1800 ===
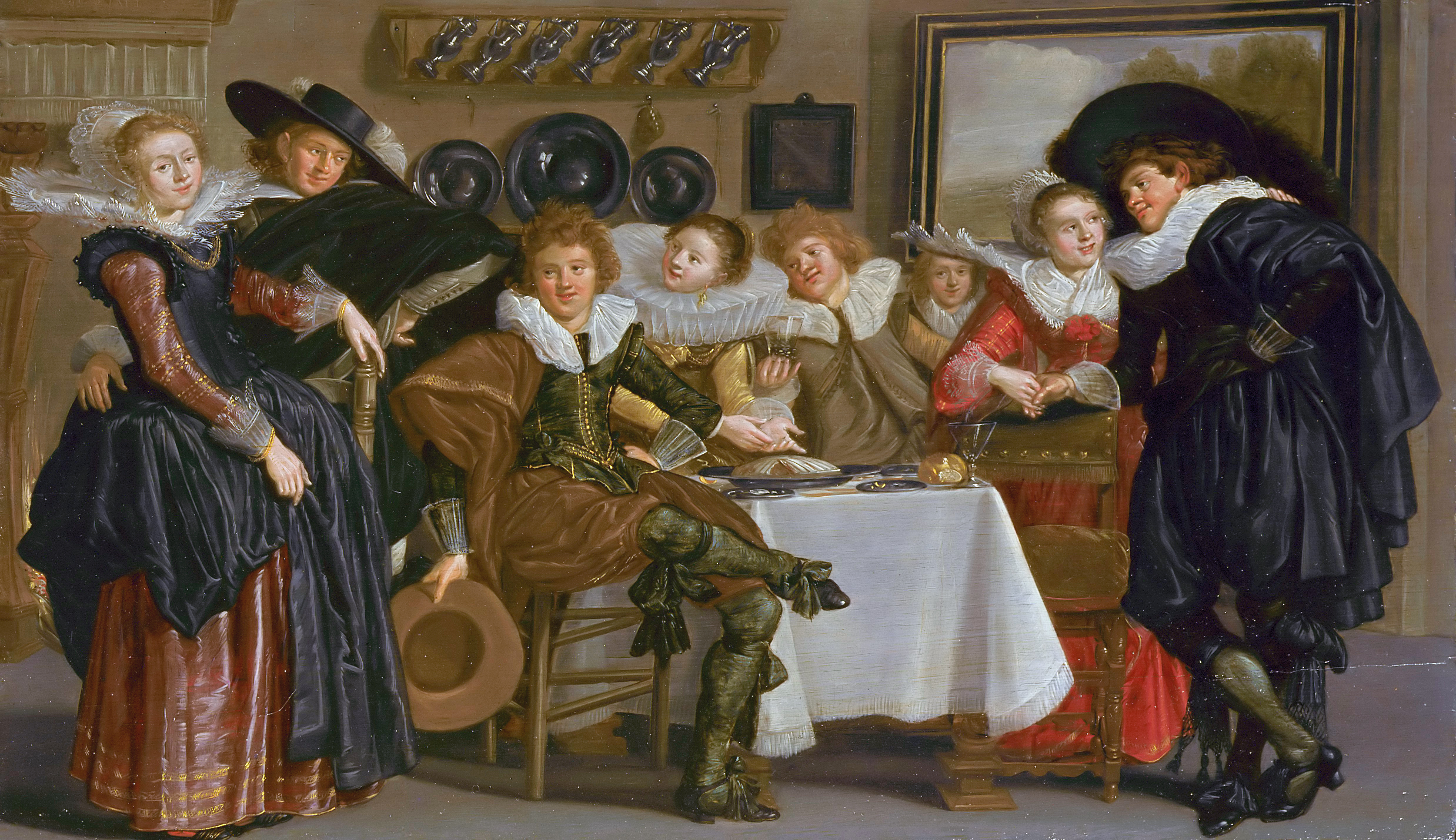
Merry Company, by Dirck Hals

The Low Countries dominated the field until the 18th century, and in the 17th century both Flemish Baroque painting and Dutch Golden Age painting produced numerous specialists who mostly painted genre scenes. In the previous century, the Flemish Renaissance painter Jan Sanders van Hemessen painted innovative large-scale genre scenes, sometimes including a moral theme or a religious scene in the background in the first half of the 16th century. These were part of a pattern of "Mannerist inversion" in Antwerp painting, giving "low" elements previously in the decorative background of images prominent emphasis. Joachim Patinir expanded his landscapes, making the figures a small element, and Pieter Aertsen painted works dominated by spreads of still life food and genre figures of cooks or market-sellers, with small religious scenes in spaces in the background. Pieter Brueghel the Elder made peasants and their activities, very naturalistically treated, the subject of many of his paintings, and genre painting was to flourish in Northern Europe in Brueghel's wake.

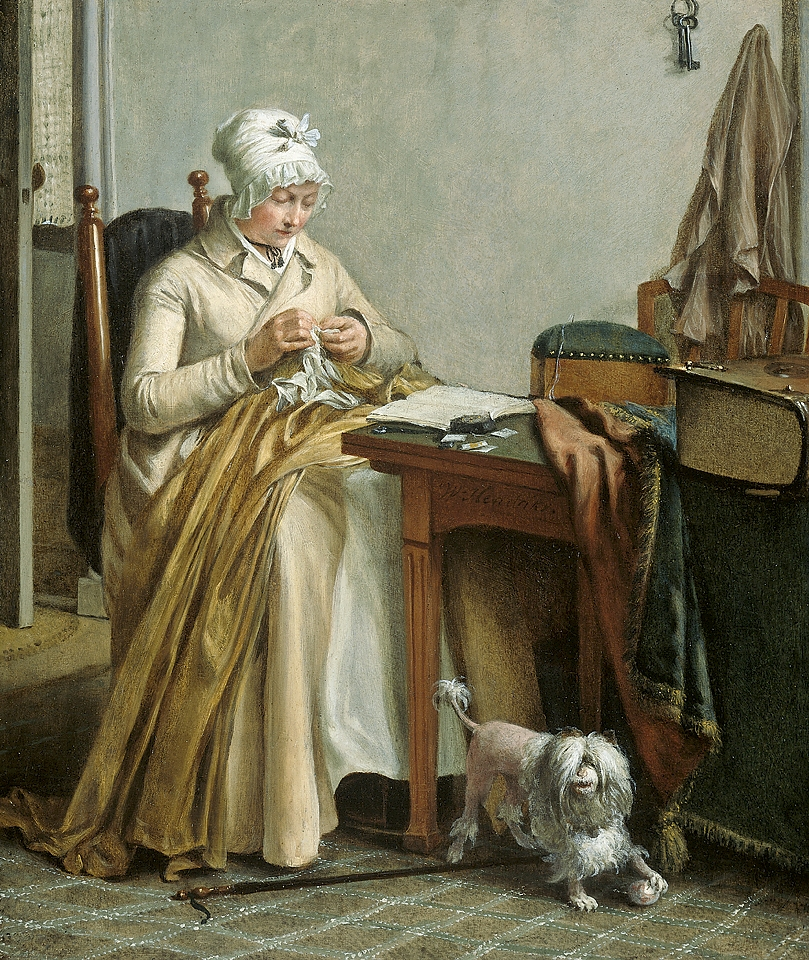
Interior with woman by Wybrand Hendriks

Adriaen and Isaac van Ostade, Jan Steen, Adriaen Brouwer, David Teniers, Aelbert Cuyp, Johannes Vermeer and Pieter de Hooch were among the many painters specializing in genre subjects in the Low Countries during the 17th century. The generally small scale of these artists' paintings was appropriate for their display in the homes of middle class purchasers. Often the subject of a genre painting was based on a popular emblem from an emblem book. This can give the painting a double meaning, such as in Gabriel Metsu's The Poultry seller, 1662, showing an old man offering a rooster in a symbolic pose that is based on a lewd engraving by Gillis van Breen (1595–1622), with the same scene. The merry company showed a group of figures at a party, whether making music at home or just drinking in a tavern. Other common types of scenes showed markets or fairs, village festivities ("kermesse"), or soldiers in camp.

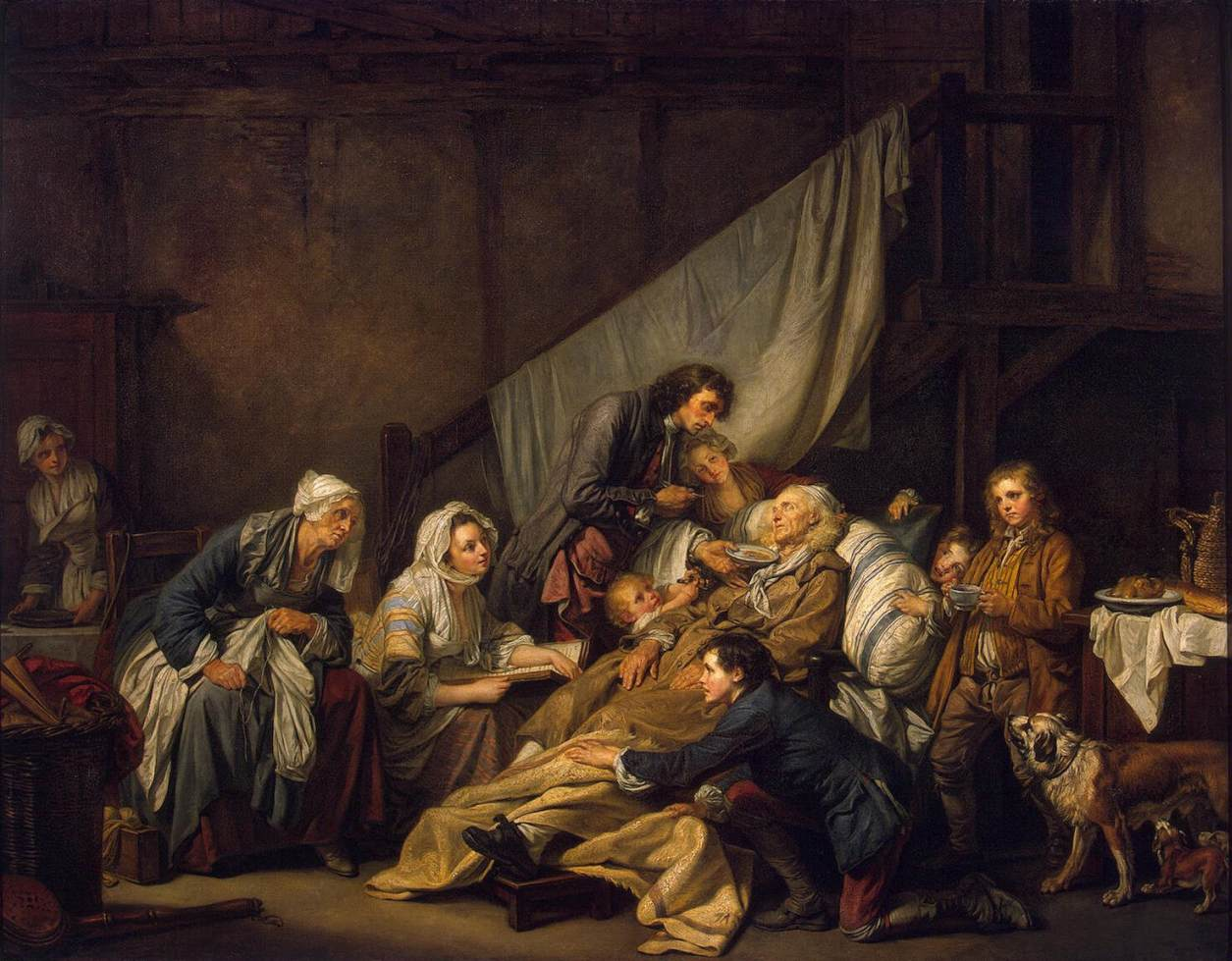
Jean-Baptiste Greuze, Filial Piety, 1765

In Italy, a "school" of genre painting was stimulated by the arrival in Rome of the Dutch painter Pieter van Laer in 1625. He acquired the nickname "Il Bamboccio" and his followers were called the Bamboccianti, whose works would inspire Giacomo Ceruti, Antonio Cifrondi, and Giuseppe Maria Crespi among many others.

Louis le Nain was an important exponent of genre painting in 17th-century France, painting groups of peasants at home, where the 18th century would bring a heightened interest in the depiction of everyday life, whether through the romanticized paintings of Watteau and Fragonard, or the careful realism of Chardin. Jean-Baptiste Greuze (1725-1805) and others painted detailed and rather sentimental groups or individual portraits of peasants that were to be influential on 19th-century painting.

In England, William Hogarth (1697–1764) conveyed comedy, social criticism and moral lessons through canvases that told stories of ordinary people full of narrative detail (aided by long sub-titles), often in serial form, as in his A Rake's Progress, first painted in 1732–33, then engraved and published in print form in 1735.

Spain had a tradition predating The Book of Good Love of social observation and commentary based on the Old Roman Latin tradition, practiced by many of its painters and illuminators. At the height of the Spanish Empire and the beginning of its slow decline, many picaresque genre scenes of street life—as well as the kitchen scenes known as bodegones—were painted by the artists of The Spanish Golden Age, notably Velázquez (1599–1660) and Murillo (1617–82). More than a century later, the Spanish artist Francisco de Goya (1746–1828) used genre scenes in painting and printmaking as a medium for dark commentary on the human condition. His The Disasters of War, a series of 82 genre incidents from the Peninsular War, took genre art to unprecedented heights of expressiveness.

=== 19th century ===
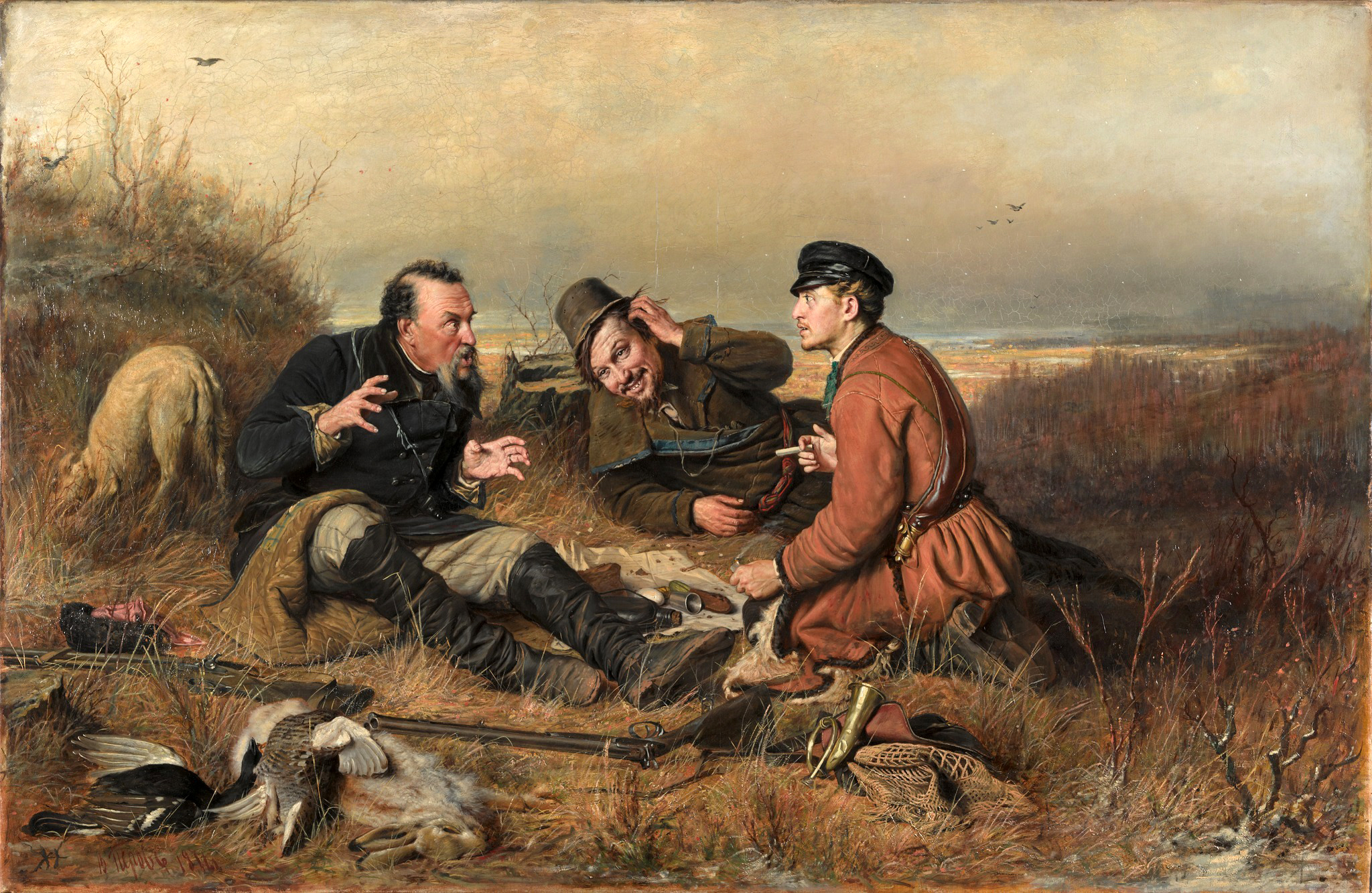
Vasily Perov, The Hunters at Rest (1871)

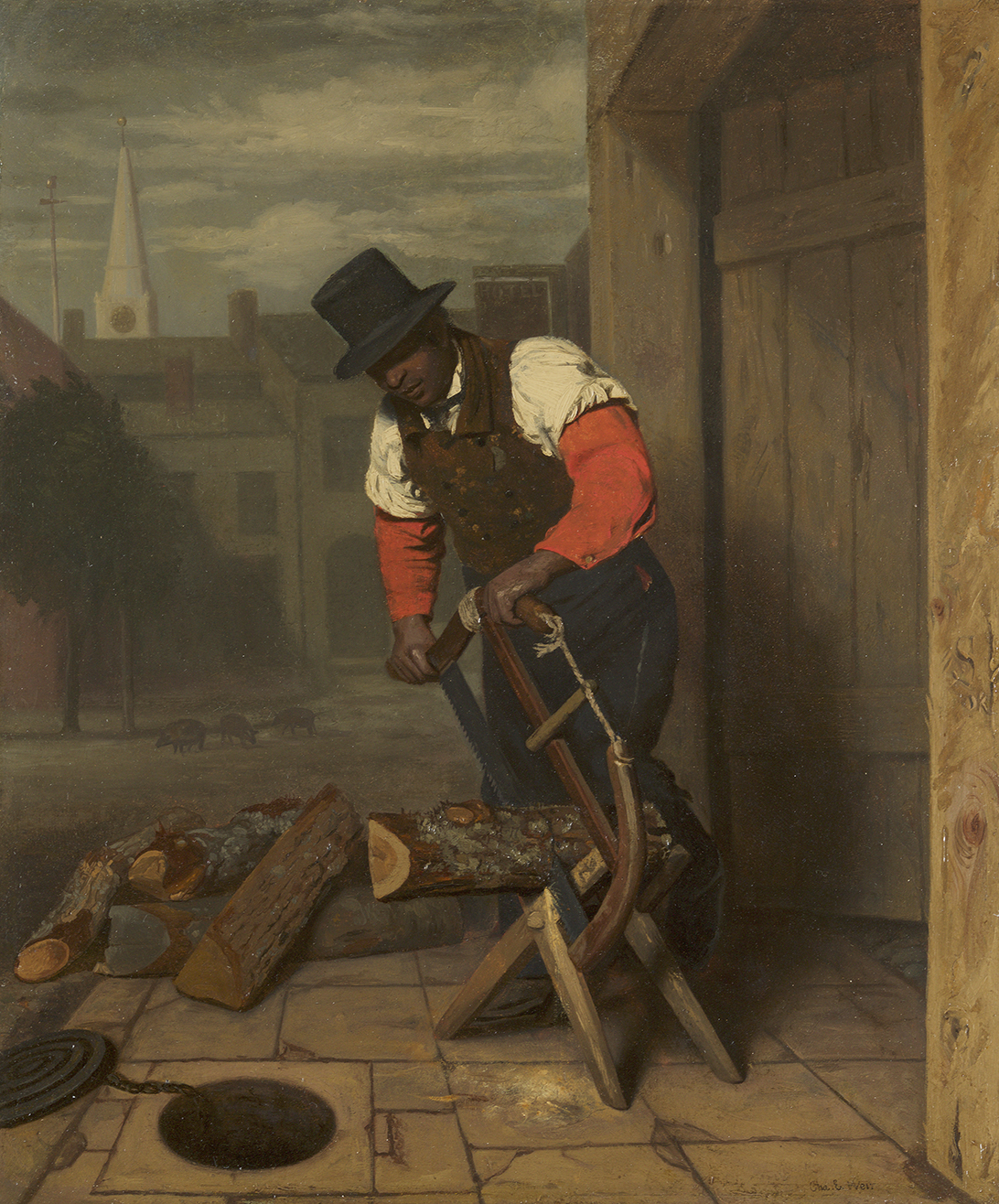
The Wood Sawyer, Charles E. Weir, Metropolitan Museum of Art, 1842

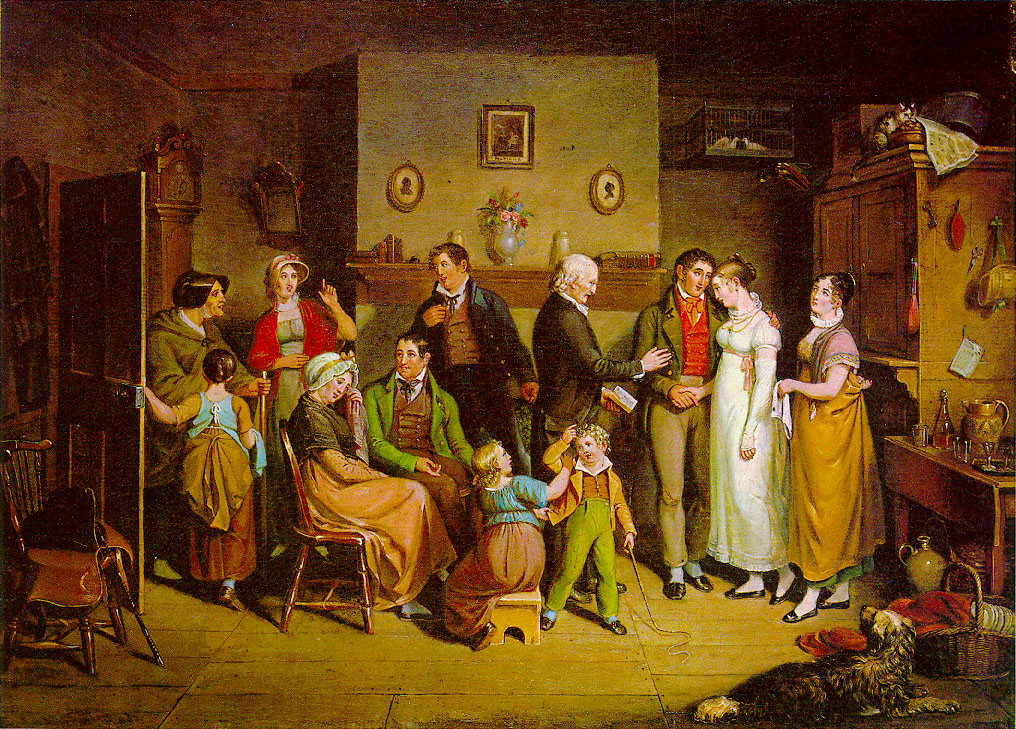
John Lewis Krimmel, Country Wedding (1820)

With the decline of religious and historical painting in the 19th century, artists increasingly found their subject matter in the life around them. Realists such as Gustave Courbet (1819–77) upset expectations by depicting everyday scenes in huge paintings—at the scale traditionally reserved for "important" subjects—thus blurring the boundary which had set genre painting apart as a "minor" category. History painting itself shifted from the exclusive depiction of events of great public importance to the depiction of genre scenes in historical times, both the private moments of great figures, and the everyday life of ordinary people. In French art this was known as the Troubador style. This trend, already apparent by 1817 when Ingres painted Henri IV Playing with His Children, culminated in the pompier art of French academicians such as Jean-Léon Gérôme (1824–1904) and Jean-Louis-Ernest Meissonier (1815–91). In the second half of the century interest in genre scenes, often in historical settings or with pointed social or moral comment, greatly increased across Europe.

William Powell Frith (1819–1909) was perhaps the most famous English genre painter of the Victorian era, painting large and extremely crowded scenes; the expansion in size and ambition in 19th-century genre painting was a common trend. Other 19th-century English genre painters include Augustus Leopold Egg, Frederick Daniel Hardy, George Elgar Hicks, William Holman Hunt and John Everett Millais. Scotland produced two influential genre painters, David Allan (1744–96) and Sir David Wilkie (1785–1841). Wilkie's The Cottar's Saturday Night (1837) inspired a major work by the French painter Gustave Courbet, After Dinner at Ornans (1849). Famous Russian realist painters like Pavel Fedotov, Vasily Perov, and Ilya Repin also produced genre paintings.

In Germany, Carl Spitzweg (1808–85) specialized in gently humorous genre scenes, and in Italy Gerolamo Induno (1825–90) painted scenes of military life. Subsequently, the Impressionists, as well as such 20th-century artists as Pierre Bonnard, Itshak Holtz, Edward Hopper, and David Park painted scenes of daily life. But in the context of modern art the term "genre painting" has come to be associated mainly with painting of an especially anecdotal or sentimental nature, painted in a traditionally realistic technique.

The first true genre painter in the United States was the German immigrant John Lewis Krimmel, who learning from Wilkie and Hogarth, produced gently humorous scenes of life in Philadelphia from 1812 to 1821. Other notable 19th-century genre painters from the United States include George Caleb Bingham, William Sidney Mount, and Eastman Johnson. Harry Roseland focused on scenes of poor African Americans in the post-American Civil War South, and John Rogers (1829–1904) was a sculptor whose small genre works, mass-produced in cast plaster, were immensely popular in America. The works of American painter Ernie Barnes (1938–2009) and those of illustrator Norman Rockwell (1894–1978) could exemplify a more modern type of genre painting.

=== Genre in other traditions ===
Japanese ukiyo-e prints are rich in depictions of people at leisure and at work, as are Korean paintings, particularly those created in the 18th century.

=== Gallery of Flemish genre paintings ===
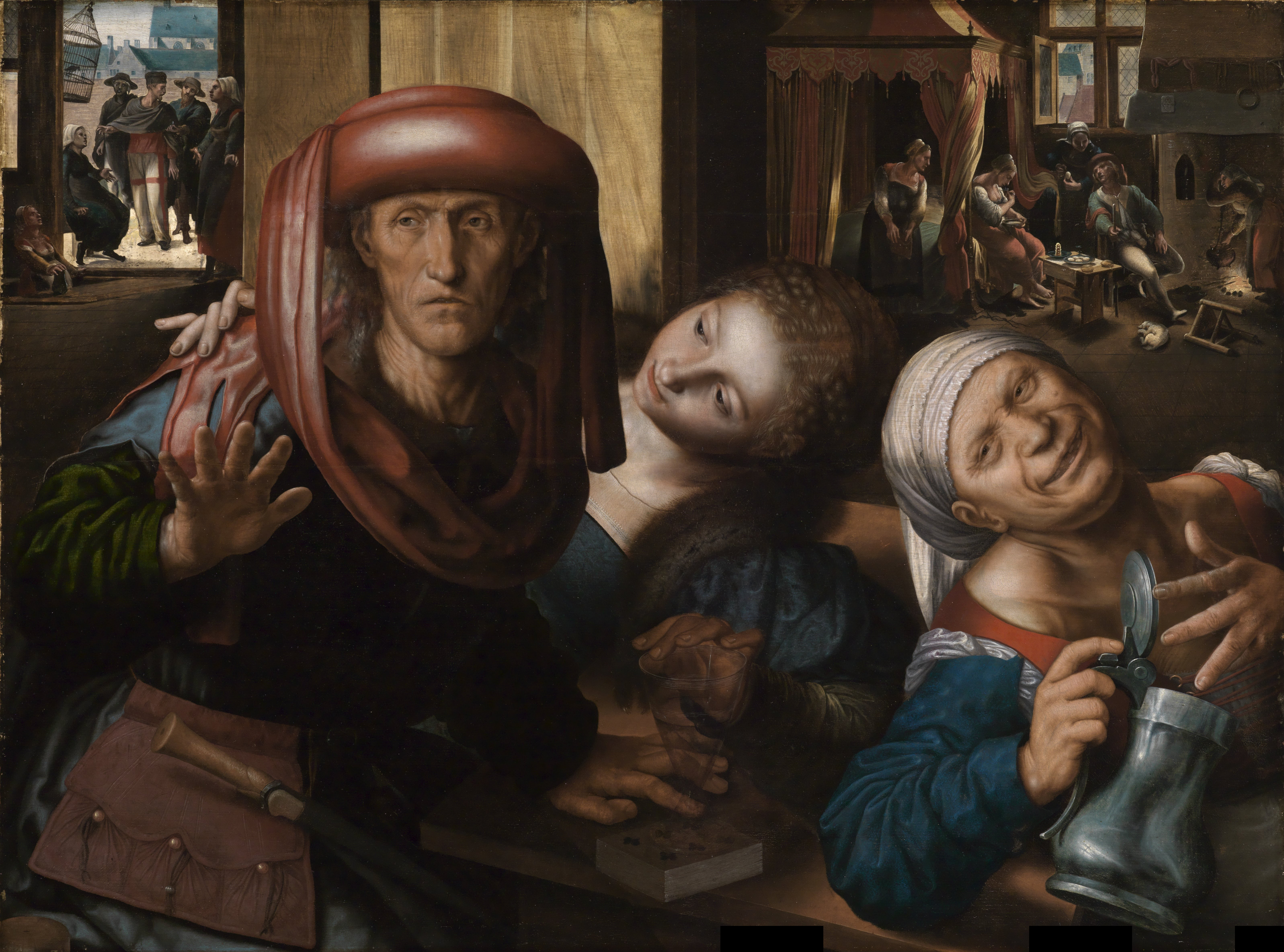
Jan Sanders van Hemessen, Brothel scene, c. 1545–1550.

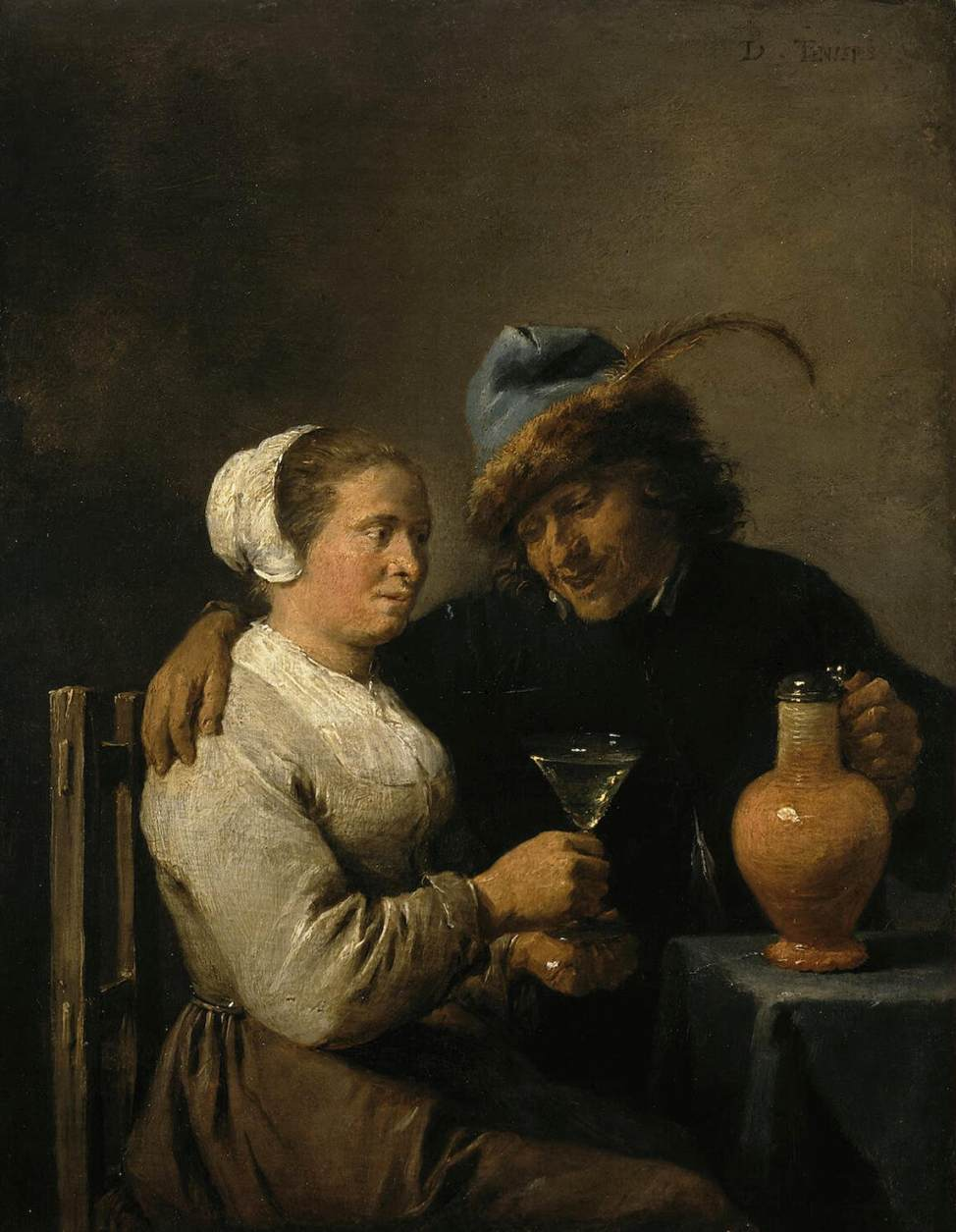
David Teniers the Younger, Tavern scene, 1640.

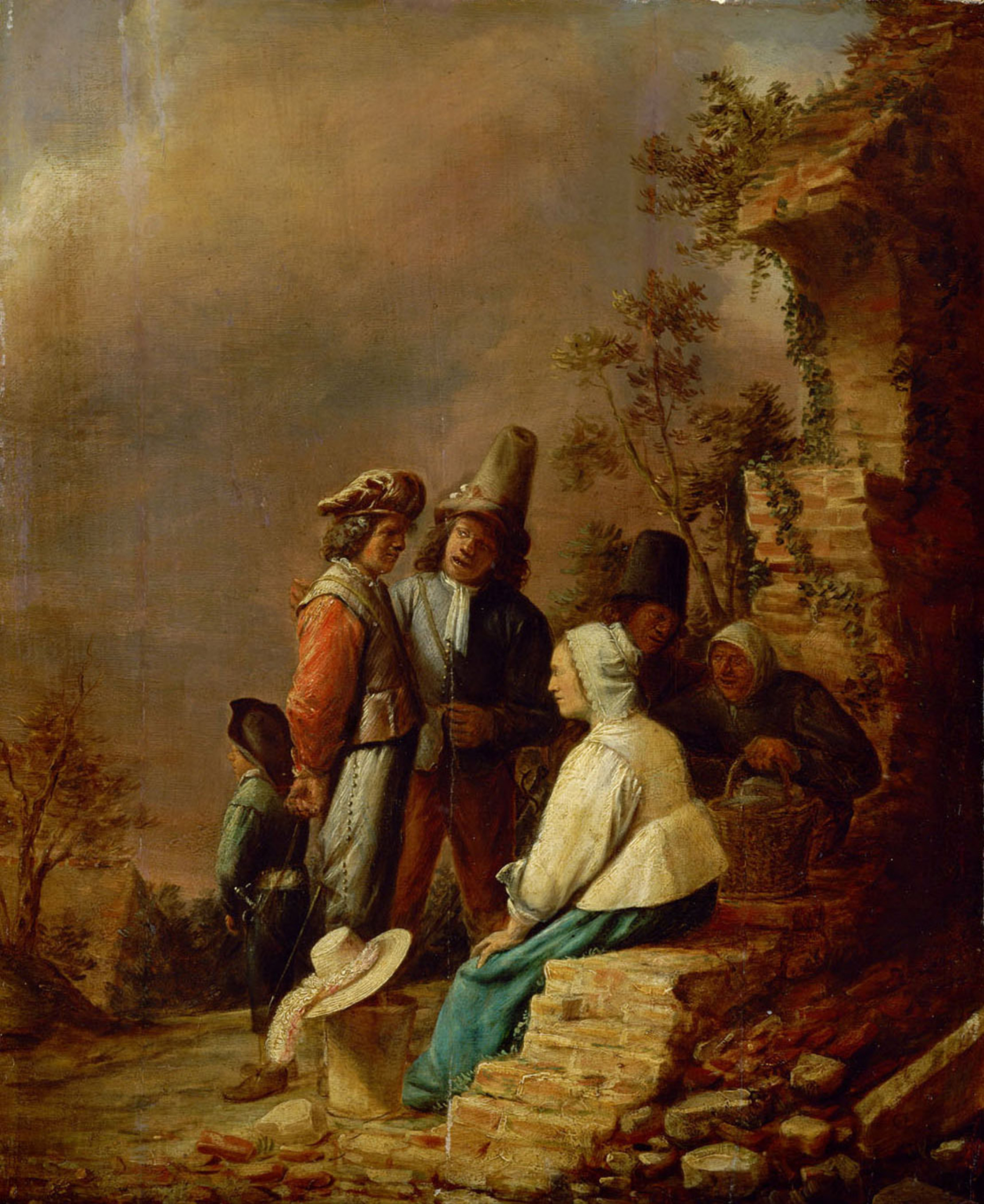
Joos van Craesbeeck, Soldiers and Women, 1640s

=== Gallery of Dutch 17th-century genre paintings ===
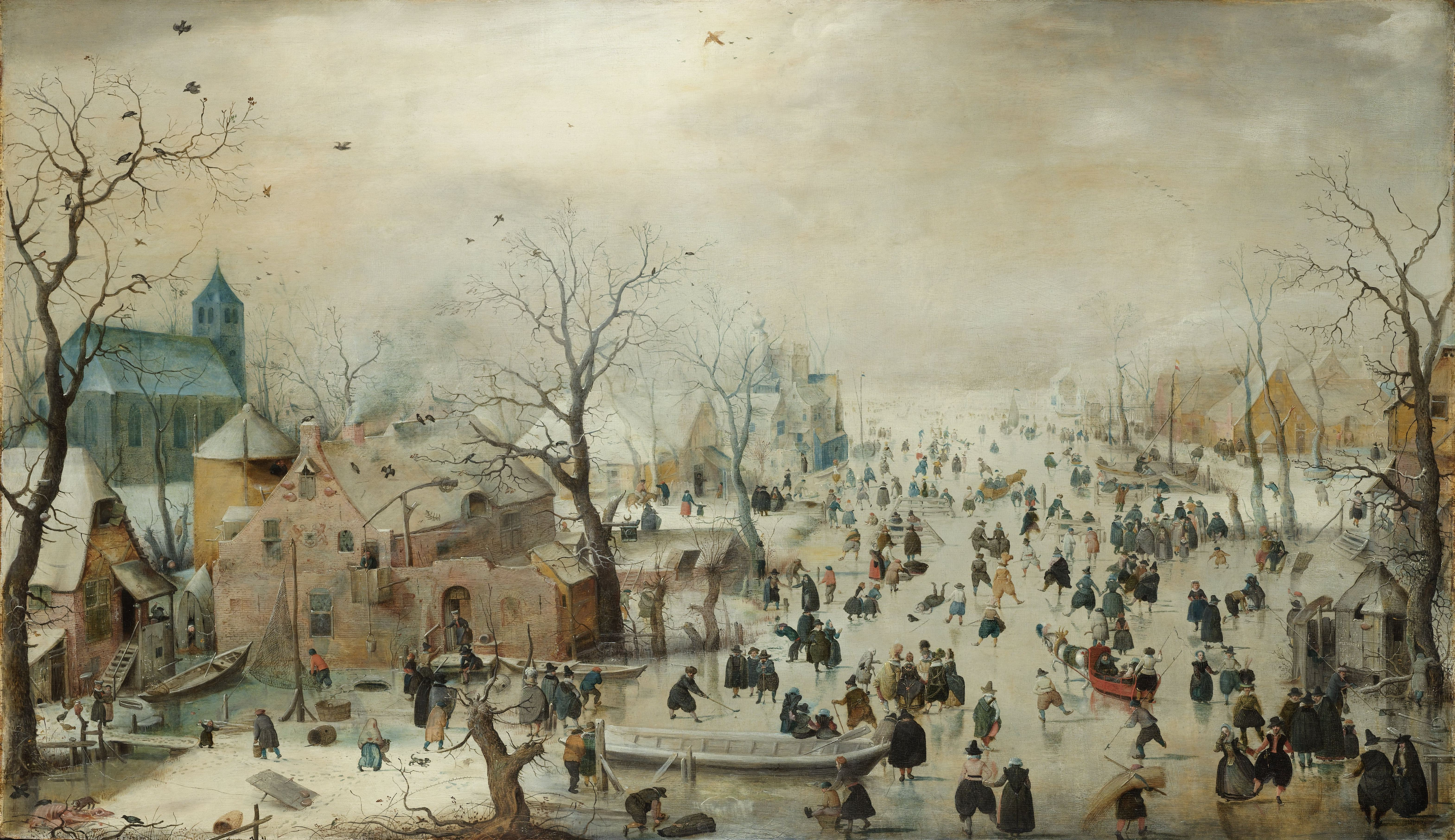
Hendrick Avercamp painted almost exclusively winter scenes of crowds.

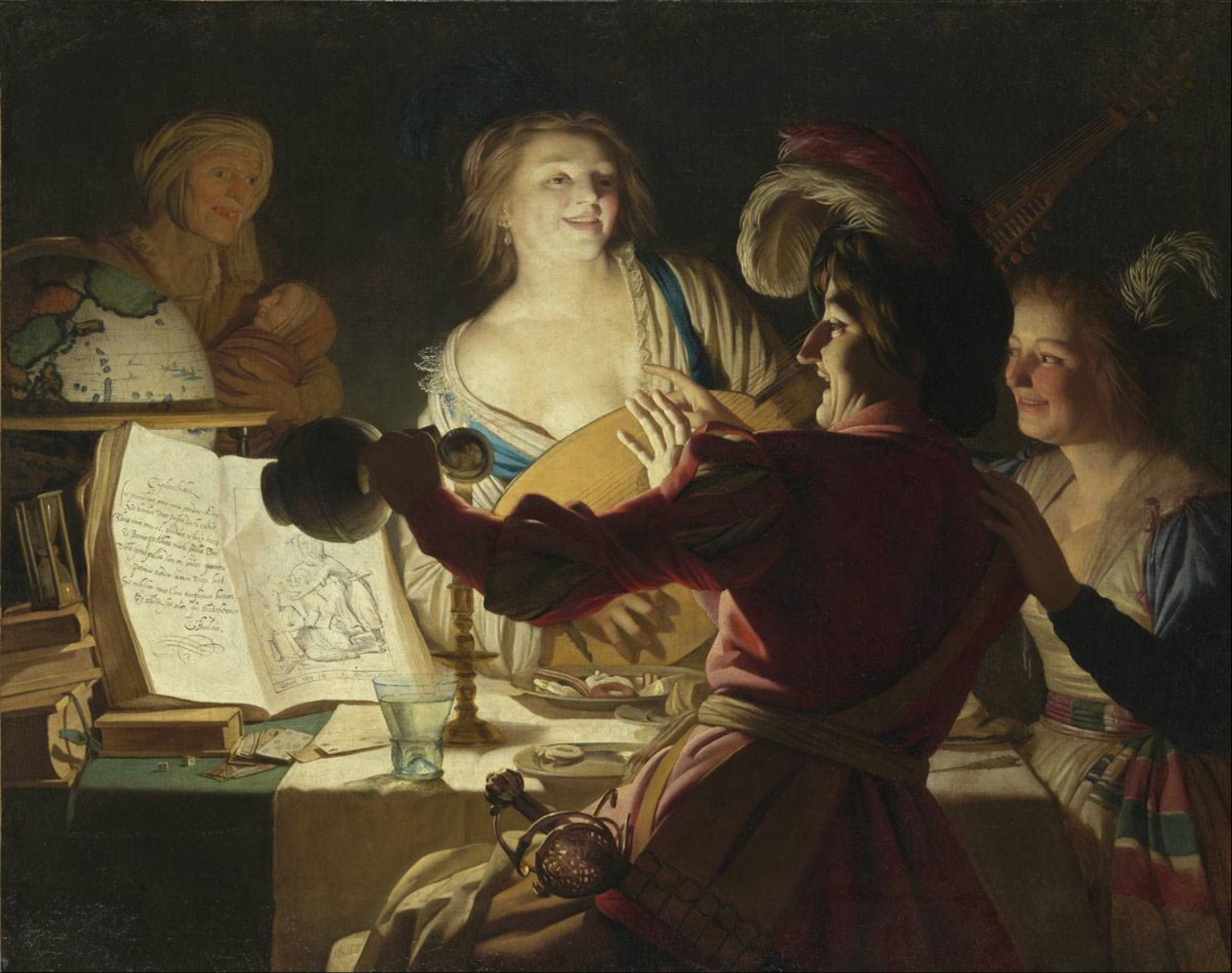
Gerard van Honthorst, Merry Company, 1623, with the chiaroscuro composition often used by the Utrecht Caravaggists.

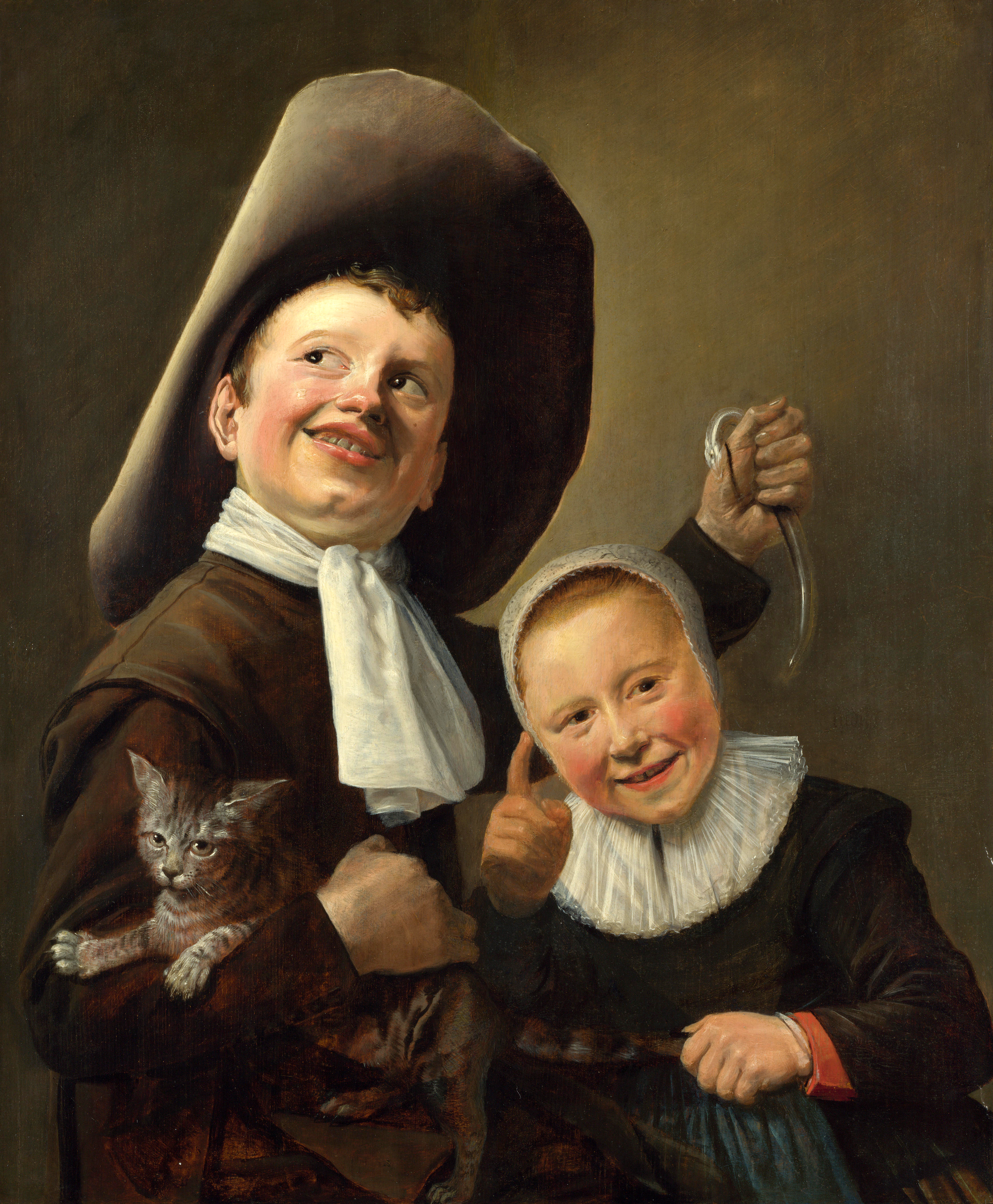
Judith Leyster, A Boy and a Girl with a Cat and an Eel, c. 1635

== Genre photography ==
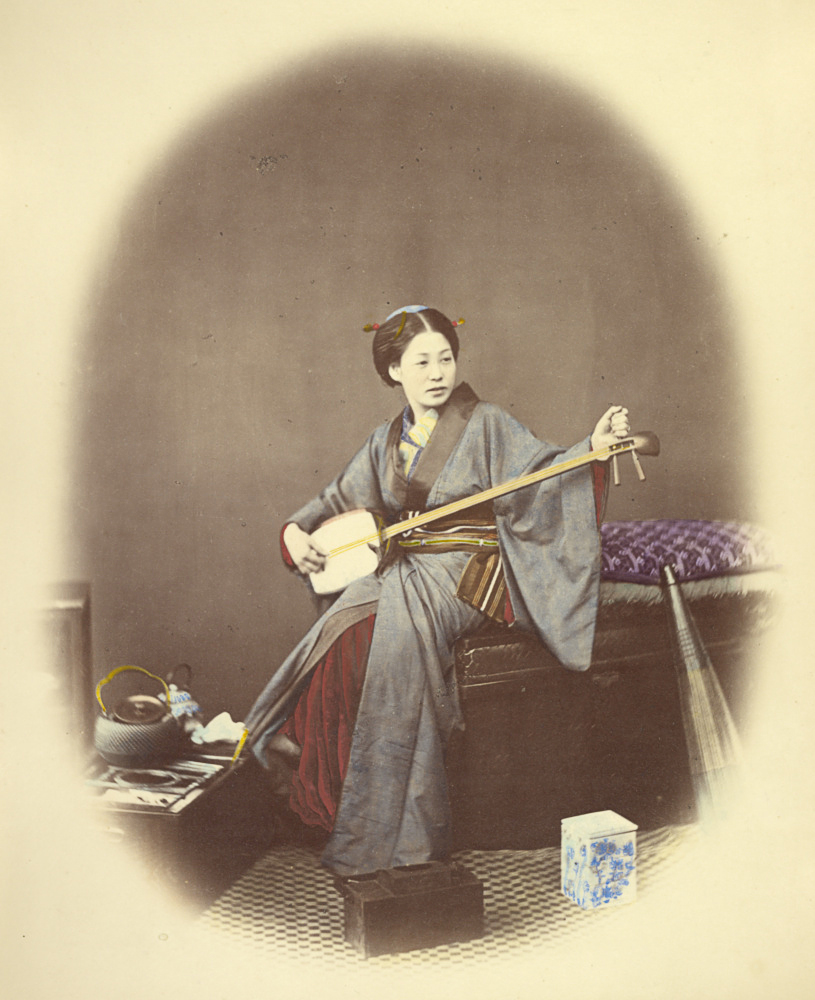
Woman playing a shamisen, 1860s, hand-coloured albumen silver print by Felice Beato

While genre painting began, in the 17th century, with representations by Europeans of European life, the invention and early development of photography coincided with the most expansive and aggressive era of European imperialism, in the mid-to-late 19th century, and so genre photographs, typically made in the proximity of military, scientific and commercial expeditions, often also depict the people of other cultures that Europeans encountered throughout the world.

Although the distinctions are not clear, genre works should be distinguished from ethnographic studies, which are pictorial representations resulting from direct observation and descriptive study of the culture and way of life of particular societies, and which constitute one class of products of such disciplines as anthropology and the behavioural sciences.

The development of photographic technology to make cameras portable and exposures instantaneous enabled photographers to venture beyond the studio to follow other art forms in the depiction of everyday life. This category has come to be known as street photography.

== See also ==
- Illustration
