= Piston-cylinder apparatus =

The piston-cylinder apparatus is a solid media device, used in Geosciences and Material Sciences, for generating simultaneously high pressure (up to 6 GPa) and temperature (up to 1700 °C). Modifications of the normal set-up can push these limits to even higher pressures and temperatures. A particular type of piston-cylinder, called Griggs apparatus, is also able to add a deviatoric stress on the sample.

The principle of the instrument is to generate pressure by compressing a sample assembly, which includes a resistance furnace, inside a pressure vessel. Controlled high temperature is generated by applying a regulated voltage to the furnace and monitoring the temperature with a thermocouple. The pressure vessel is a cylinder that is closed at one end by a rigid plate with a small hole for the thermocouple to pass through. A piston is advanced into the cylinder at the other hand.

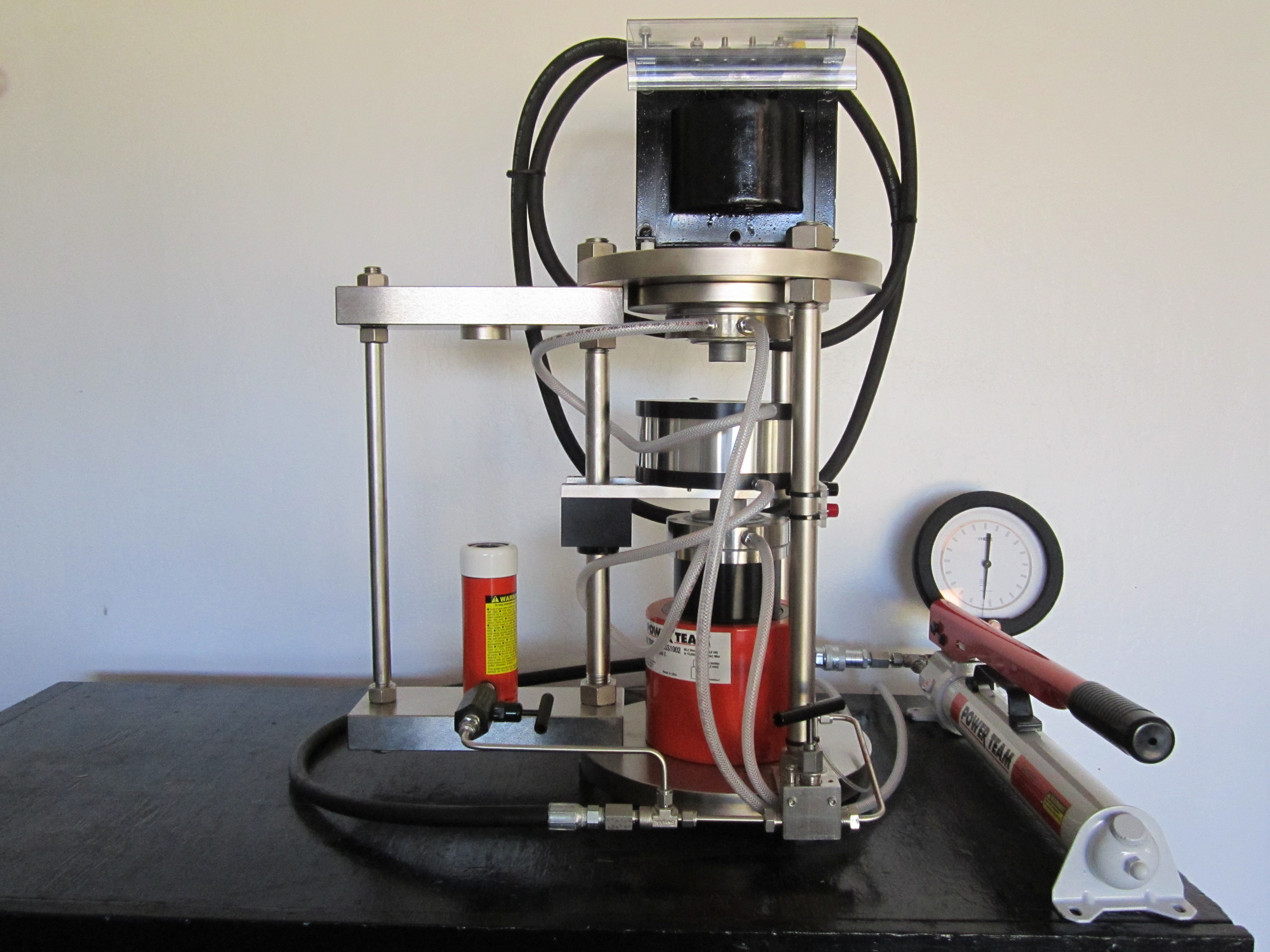
Non endloaded piston cylinder apparatus (2016)

== History ==
Sir Charles Parsons was the first to attack the problem of generating high pressure simultaneously with high temperature. His pressure apparatus consisted of piston-cylinder devices that used internal electrical resistance heating. He used a solid pressure transmitting material, which also served as thermal and electrical insulation. His cylindrical chambers ranged in diameter from 1 to 15 cm. The maximum pressure at the temperature he reported was of the order of 15000 atm (corresponding to ~1.5 GPa) at 3000 °C.

Loring L. Coes, Jr., of the Norton Co., was the first person to develop a piston-cylinder device with capabilities substantially beyond those of the Parsons device. He did not personally publish a description of this equipment until 1962. The key feature of this device is the use of a hot, molded alumina liner or cylinder. The apparatus is double ended, pressure being generated by pushing a tungsten carbide piston into each end of the alumina cylinder. Because the alumina cylinder is electrically insulating, heating is accomplished, very simply, by passing an electric current from one piston through a sample heating tube and out through the opposite piston. The apparatus was used at pressures as high as 45000 atm (corresponding to ~4.5 GPa) simultaneously with a temperature of 800 °C. Temperature was measured by means of a thermocouple located in a well. At these temperature and pressure conditions, only one run is obtained in this device, the pistons and the alumina cylinder both being expendable. Even at 30000 atm (corresponding to ~3.0 GPa) the alumina cylinder is only useful for a few runs, as is also the case for the tungsten carbide pistons. The expense of using such a device is great.

Nowadays both the piston and the cylinder are constructed of cemented tungsten carbide and electrical insulation is provided in a different manner than in the device of Coes. In particular, the basis for the modern piston-cylinder apparatus is given by the design described by Boyd and England in 1960, which has been the first machine that allowed experiments under upper mantle conditions to be routinely carried out in a laboratory.

Geologist Bernard Wood has made multiple important contributions to science using piston-cylinder experiments and has consequently become a prominent figure in experimental petrology. Along with Fred Wheeler, a workshop worker at the University of Bristol, he has designed a model of piston-cylinder that is known for its simplicity and blue features. Several units of this model have been made at the University of Oxford.

== Theory ==
The piston-cylinder apparatus is based on the same simple relationship of other high-pressure devices (e.g. Multi-anvil press and Diamond Anvil Cell):

$P = \frac{F}{A}$

where P is the pressure, F the applied force and A the area.

It achieves high pressures using the principle of pressure amplification: converting a small load on a large piston to a relatively large load on a small piston. The uniaxial pressure is then distributed (quasi-hydrostatically) over the sample through deformation of the assembly materials.

== Components ==
The main components of the piston-cylinder apparatus are the pressure generating system, the pressure vessel, and the assembly parts within the vessel. There are two types of piston-cylinder apparatus: non end-loaded and end-loaded, which involve, respectively, one or two hydraulic rams. In the end-loaded type the second hydraulic ram is used to vertically load and strengthen the pressure vessel. The non end-loaded type is smaller, more compact and cheaper, and is operable only to approximately 4 GPa.

Pressure is applied to the sample by pressing a piston into the sample volume of the pressure vessel. The sample assembly consists of a solid pressure medium, a resistance heater and a small central volume for the sample. Three common configurations are used: $\tfrac{1}{2}$”, $\tfrac{3}{4}$” and 1”, which are the diameters of the piston and thus the sample assembly. According to the pressure amplification concept, the choice of the piston depends on the pressure you need to achieve.

During the experiment, water circulates around the pressure vessel, the bridge and the upper plates to cool the system.

=== Sample assemblies ===
The purposes of the sample assembly are to transmit hydrostatic pressure to the sample from the compressing piston, to provide controlled heating of the sample and to provide, via the capsule, a suitable volatile and oxygen fugacity environment for the experiment. Therefore, it includes a component for each of these purposes.

The outer cylinder is a pressure transmitting, electrically insulating cylinder made from NaCl, talc, BaCO_{3}, KBr, CaF_{2}, or even borosilicate glass. The next components are, in order, an electrically insulating borosilicate glass cylinder and a graphite cylinder, which acts as the “furnace”. To locate the sample exactly in the centre of the furnace and to grip the thermocouple, a support rod usually made of crushable ceramics is used. The final component is a conductive steel base plug, located at the top of the sample assembly.

The final part of the assembly is the thermocouple itself, whose wires are insulated from one another and from the material of the assembly by a tube made of mullite.

=== Capsules ===
The sample capsule must contain the sample and prevent reaction between the sample and the other materials of the sample assembly and not, itself, react with the sample. It must also be weak so as not to interfere with pressure transmission during the run. For this purpose, the materials most used are: Au, Pt, AgPd alloys, Ni and graphite.

Sample volumes are typically 200 mm^{3}, which translates to ~500 mg of starting material, but with larger assemblies the volume can be up to 750 mm^{3}.

== Pressure control ==
The nominal pressure in an experiment can be calculated from the amplification of the oil pressure through the reduction in area over which it is applied, but every component has a characteristic yield stress, consequently the nominal pressure is different from the effective one. Thus, it must be adjusted taking into account the friction:

P_{effective} = P_{nominal} + P_{correction}

In order to determine the effective pressure, calibration experiments can be done using either static or dynamic methods, and usually make use of known phase transitions or reactions, melting curves or measured water solubility in melts.

Since frictional effects also depend on whether the press is in compression or in decompression, it is good practice to perform the experiments in the same way as the calibration runs.

== Temperature control ==
Temperature can be measured using a thermocouple within an accuracy of ± 1 °C. The accuracy of the temperature is influenced by both random and systematic errors, and is smaller at higher temperature and pressure conditions. Such errors can arise from temperature gradients, differential pressures in the assembly, contamination during the experiment and the effect of pressure on thermocouple electromotive force. These errors can be cushioned choosing the appropriate thermocouple type for the experimental conditions. Temperature gradients, on the other hand, can be minimised using a tapered furnace.

== Applications ==
The main advantages of the piston-cylinder press are the relatively large volume of the assembly, fast heating and quenching rates, and the stability of the equipment over long run durations.

These aspects, together with the ease and safety of procedure make this device suitable for geochemical studies and in-situ measurements of the physical properties of materials.

Some applications, especially in Geosciences, are: synthesis of high-pressure and temperature materials, hot pressing and investigation of partial melting of rocks.
