= Alvin Van Valkenburg =

Alvin Van Valkenburg, Jr. (12 August 1913, Schenectady, New York – 5 December 1991, Tucson, Arizona) was an experimental physicist, geologist, geochemist, and inventor, known as one of the four co-inventors of the diamond anvil cell (DAC).

Alvin Van Valkenburg, Jr. graduated in 1936 from Schenectady's Union College with a B.S. in geology and in 1938 from the University of Colorado Boulder with an M.S. in mineralogy and petrology. After returning to Schenectady to teach at Union College, he moved to the Boston area, where he worked from 1941 to 1945 at the Charleston Navy Yard as a physicist in charge of degaussing ships. During WWII he enrolled as a graduate student at Harvard University, where he studied under Percy Bridgman and the mineralogist Esper S. Larsen, Jr. (1879–1961). In 1945 Van Valkenburg became employed at the National Bureau of Standards (NBS) in Washington, DC. From 1945 to 1946 he pursued graduate studies at Johns Hopkins University. He married Elsie Victoria Erling, whom he met in Washington, on 1 June 1946 at the Ebenezer Lutheran Church in Minneapolis.

By the early 1950s ... John Jamieson and his group at Chicago and Van and several others at NBS were experimenting with single crystals of diamond, both as pressure vessels and as the pressure-transmitting medium. By the late 1950s, the NBS group of Weir, Lippincott, Van Valkenburg, and Bunting had developed a small hand-portable instrument that in early versions easily reached pressures in excess of 30000 atm and apparently had the potential of reaching much higher pressures. Three patents for this instrument were shared among Van and his colleagues at NBS.

Van Valkenburg is generally considered the originator of the practice of placing a washer-shaped gasket of extremely thin (about .3 mm) metal foil between the two diamond faces of the DAC. The gasket (made of a metal such as rhenium or tungsten) flows under ultra-high pressure and fills the central hole with fluid to achieve hydrostatic conditions. The tiny sample to be analyzed is compressed between the two opposing culets (tips) of diamond. The gasket is used to maintain the sample's contact with the culets, where the pressure is at a maximum.

In 1964 he left the NBS and became employed at the National Science Foundation (NSF). There he was director of the geochemistry program from 1964 to 1970 and retired in 1974. From 1974 to 1980 he was a guest investigator at the Geophysical Laboratory. In 1980 he moved to Tucson, Arizona and transferred his small business of manufacturing and selling DACs from Washington, DC to Tucson, where he was a business partner with his son, Eric.

In 1986 the Franklin Institute awarded Van Valkenburg the John Price Wetherill Medal for his co-invention of the DAC, which "has revolutionized high pressure research, by allowing static pressures equivalent to that in the earth's core to be produced in the laboratory."

Upon his death in 1991 Alvin Van Valkenburg was survived by his widow, his son, two daughters, and two grandchildren. The Gordon Research Conference on High Pressure gives an award named after him.

== Selected publications ==
- Van Valkenburg Jr, A.; McMurdie, H.F. (1947). "High‐Temperature X‐Ray Diffraction Apparatus". Am. Ceram. Soc. Bull. 26 (5): 139–142. S2CID 20470739.
- Van Valkenburg, A.; Pike, R.G. (1952). "Synthesis of mica". Journal of Research of the National Bureau of Standards. 48 (5): 360–369. doi:10.6028/jres.048.045.
- Bunting, E.N.; Van Valkenburg, A. (1958). "Some properties of diamond". American Mineralogist. 43 (1–2): 102–106.
- Lippincott, E.R.; Van Valkenburg, A.; Weir, C.E.; Bunting, E.N. (1958). "Infrared studies on polymorphs of silicon dioxide and germanium dioxide". Journal of Research of the National Bureau of Standards. 61 (1): 61–70. doi:10.6028/jres.061.009.
- Weir, C. E.; Lippincott, E. R.; Van Valkenburg, A; Bunting, E. N. (1959). "Infrared studies in the 1- to 15-micron region to 30,000 atmospheres". Journal of Research of the National Bureau of Standards Section A. 63A (1): 55–62. doi:10.6028/jres.063A.003. ISSN 0022-4332. PMC 5287102. PMID 31216141.
- Lippincott, E.R.; Weir, C.E.; Van Valkenburg, A.; Bunting, E.N. (1960). "Studies of infrared absorption spectra of solids at high pressures". Spectrochimica Acta. 16 (1–2): 58–73. Bibcode:1960AcSpe..16...58L. doi:10.1016/0371-1951(60)80071-9. ISSN 0371-1951.
- Van Valkenburg, A. (1962). "Visual Observations of High Pressure Transitions". Review of Scientific Instruments. 33 (12): 1462. Bibcode:1962RScI...33.1462V. doi:10.1063/1.1717803. ISSN 0034-6748.
- Van Valkenburg, A. (1964). "High Pressure Microscopy of the Silver and Cuprous Halides". Journal of Research of the National Bureau of Standards Section A. 68A (1): 97–103. doi:10.6028/jres.068A.008. PMC 5325174. PMID 31834717.
