= The Wood Sawyer (Weir) =

Painting by Charles E. Weir

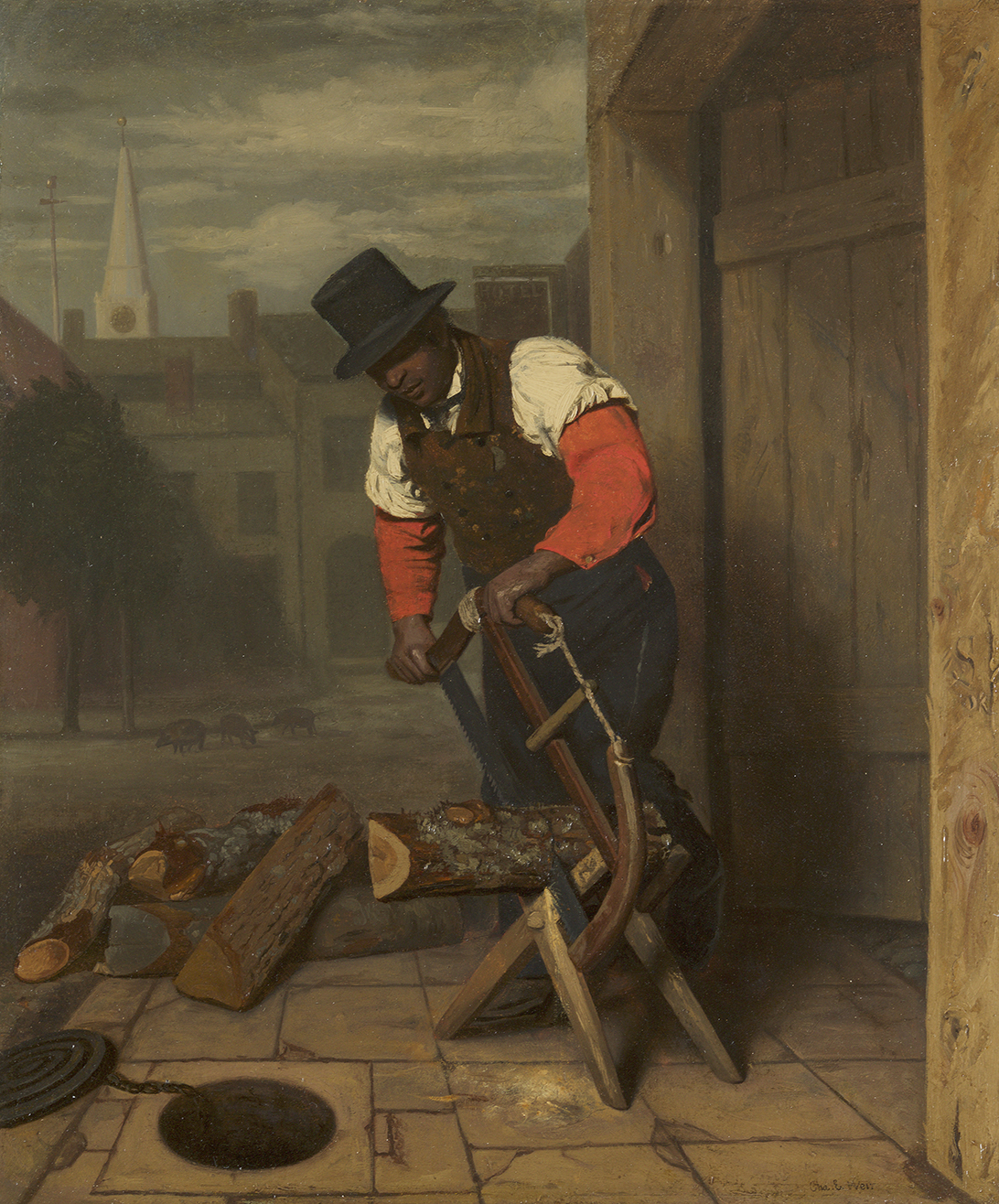
- Artist: Charles E. Weir
- Year: 1842
- Medium: Oil on board
- Dimensions: 56.5 cm × 46.4 cm (22.2 in × 18.3 in)
- Location: Metropolitan Museum of Art, New York City
- Accession: 2018.6

The Wood Sawyer is a mid 19th-century painting by American artist Charles E. Weir. Done in oil paint on board, the painting depicts a wood sawyer in New York City. The painting - described as a work of genre art - is in the collection of the Metropolitan Museum of Art.

== Description ==
Painted by trained artist Charles E. Weir (the brother of American painter of Robert Weir), Sawyer is a work of genre art, a style of art popular in mid 19th century America. The painting depicts an African American workman (presumably a coachman or porter) chopping wood outside a hotel in Lower Manhattan, then a developing part of the city. As described by the Metropolitan Museum of Art, Sawyer is unique among pre American Civil War genre paintings in that it depicts an African American in a positive light.

The painting contains many indicators of its New York setting; the manhole cover refers to the Croton Aqueduct (completed in 1842, the same year as the painting), and the white steeple in the background is likely St. Mark's Church in-the-Bowery.
