= Ellis R. Lippincott =

American chemist (1920 to 1974)

Ellis Ridgeway Lippincott Jr. (July 6, 1920 – December 24, 1974) was an American chemist, educator, inventor, science leader, and pioneer in spectroscopy. He was a professor of chemistry at the University of Maryland from 1955-1974 and served as director of the Center for Materials Research. According to Spectroscopy, Lippincott was an "icon of spectroscopy" and "one of the most influential spectroscopists of the past 100 years."

== Early life and education ==
Lippincott was born in Philadelphia, Pennsylvania in 1920. A descendant of the earliest Quaker settlers of Pennsylvania and New Jersey, he was raised in Medford and received his primary and secondary education at Moorestown Friends School in New Jersey.

Lippincott received his undergraduate degree from Earlham College in Richmond, Indiana in 1943. He received a master's degree from Johns Hopkins University followed by a Ph.D. from there in 1947. Afterward he spent a year doing post-doctoral work at the Massachusetts Institute of Technology Spectroscopy Laboratory under lab director Richard C. Lord, with whom he maintained a lifelong professional association.

== Science career ==
Lippincott began his university teaching career as an Instructor of Chemistry at the University of Connecticut from 1948 to 1951. From 1951 to 1955, he was an associate professor of chemistry at Kansas State College in Manhattan, Kansas. In 1955, he became a professor of chemistry at the University of Maryland. At age 35, he was recognized as "one of the nation's top authorities on infrared and Raman spectroscopy." Lippincott remained at the University of Maryland until he died in 1974.

Lippincott was a frequent lecturer at scientific conferences, including Gordon Research Conferences and international conferences on spectroscopy, hydrogen bonding, and other scientific topics. He was program chair for the 10th Annual International Spectroscopy Colloquium in 1962 attended by 1,000 scientists from all over the world. He was a lecturer in the American Chemical Society's Visiting Scientist Program.

Lippincott was a regular faculty member of the summer Spectroscopy Course hosted by the Massachusetts Institute of Technology Spectroscopy Laboratory, lecturing every year from 1956 onward.

He founded and directed the Laser Raman Institute and Workshop at the University of Maryland, a week-long training program for scientists in the application of laser methods of research and featuring lectures by distinguished scientists on the theory of Raman spectroscopy and interpretation of spectra and instruction in advanced instrumentation.

In 1968, he founded the Raman Newsletter, a monthly newsletter he edited as a clearinghouse for current developments in experiments and research in Raman spectroscopy.

=== Center for Materials Research ===
Much of Lippincott's research was interdisciplinary in the field of materials science. He was instrumental in creating the Center for Materials Research at the University of Maryland and served as its director from 1967 to 1974. The center was one of 12 elite interdisciplinary laboratories sponsored by the Advanced Projects Research Agency (predecessor to the Defense Department's DARPA). As director, Lippincott was responsible for the scientific management of the Center and its research output.

=== Research ===
Lippincott's scientific research spanned a wide range of areas, including physical chemistry, quantum chemistry, biophysics, molecular spectra and structure, high-pressure optics, thermodynamic equilibrium in complex systems, infrared and Raman spectroscopy, hydrogen bonding, potential energy functions, applications of spectral studies to biochemistry and chemical applications of lasers, chemical and analytical applications of induced electron emission spectroscopy.

Much of Lippincott's scientific research was funded by the Advanced Projects Research Agency, Atomic Energy Commission, National Aeronautics and Space Administration, National Science Foundation, Army Research Office, and Public Health Service.

One of Lippincott's earliest research contributions was the "Lippincott-Schroeder potential," a theoretical model for hydrogen bonding which he developed with his student Rudolph Schroeder. Of this work it has been said: "This fundamental research, cited almost 900 times as of February, 2024, describes the potential energy associated with the interaction between hydrogen atoms and an electronegative partner in a molecular complex. Despite being proposed in the 1950s, the LS potential has proven to be an enduring and accurate model for hydrogen bonds, remaining relevant even with the advent of sophisticated ab initio computations seven decades later. Multiple papers have been published evaluating and testing this model against experimental data, and it continues to stand as an accurate representation of the hydrogen bond, showcasing Lippincott's valuable contributions to chemistry."

Among other research, Lippincott investigated the organic evolution of living cells from non-living compounds (i.e., the origins of life) and studied the chemical composition of planetary atmospheres of Jupiter, Mars and Venus. His research collaborators included Margaret Oakley Dayhoff and Carl Sagan.

Lippincott was a consultant to the National Bureau of Standards. He served as an expert for the Food and Drug Administration in the investigation of the controversial cancer drug Krebiozen.

With two collaborators at the National Bureau of Standards, Lippincott co-invented the Diamond Anvil High-Pressure Cell, a device for investigating materials under pressure using diamonds which significantly increased the speed and accuracy of spectroscopic observations. The device was "one of the most valuable methods for making direct observations on the properties of a sample, a capability that had never before been possible." Also with colleagues at the National Bureau of Standards, Lippincott was a lead investigator in the inquiry into anomalous water, also known as "polywater."

== Publications ==
Lippincott was the author or co-author of over 160 peer-reviewed research papers and scientific articles published in such journals as Science, Nature, Journal of Physical Chemistry, Journal of Chemical Physics, Journal of the American Chemical Society, Journal of Research of the National Bureau of Standards, Journal of the Optical Society of America, Inorganic Chemistry, Analytical Chemistry, Applied Optics, Spectrochemica Acta, and Journal of Chemical Education. One of Lippincott's most impactful papers was his article entitled "The Limitations and Advantages of Infrared Spectroscopy in Patent Problems" published in the Journal of the Patent Office. As a result of his article, the Patent Office's view of infrared spectroscopy underwent a major change.

== Scientific societies ==
Lippincott was a leading member of the community of scientists who worked in spectroscopy and related areas. His professional affiliations included the Optical Society of America (renamed Optica), Society for Applied Spectroscopy, Coblentz Society, American Chemical Society, American Physical Society, American Institute of Physics, Chemical Society of Washington, Philosophical Society of Washington, Washington Academy of Sciences, Society for Testing and Materials, International Union of Pure and Applied Chemistry, Faraday Society, and Chemical Society of London.

== Honors and awards ==
Lippincott was a member of Phi Beta Kappa and other honorary societies. He was the 1964 recipient of the Chemical Society of Washington's Hillebrand Award and the 1970 recipient of the Pittsburgh Spectroscopy Award. The Ellis R. Lippincott Award was established in his honor in 1975 by the Optical Society (since renamed Optica), the Society for Applied Spectroscopy, and the Coblentz Society. The award is conferred annually on "an individual who has made significant contributions to vibrational spectroscopy as judged by their influence on other scientists" and "recognizes individuals whose work reflects the unique blend of theoretical insight, experimental proficiency, and transformative impact exemplified by Ellis R. Lippincott." Some of the world's most eminent spectroscopists have received this prestigious award during the past fifty years. (Note: The first recipient of the award was Richard C. Lord, director of the Spectroscopy Laboratory at Massachusetts Institute of Technology. Other awardees are Lionel J. Bellamy, Bryce L. Crawford, George C. Pimentel, Peter R. Griffiths, and others.)

== Legacy ==
The trade magazine Spectroscopy stated that "Lippincott's life is a testament to the power of scientific curiosity, innovation, and a commitment to reshaping perspectives, and looking at established 'truths' with an original and inquisitive perspective. His legacy lives on through the impact of his scientific methods and discoveries."

== Personal life ==
Lippincott married Rita Clifton (1927–2024) in 1948, with whom he had five daughters. Ellis R. Lippincott Jr. died of Hodgkin's Disease in 1974 at the age of 54.

== Selected publications ==
- Jerome J. Workman, Jr., Ellis Ridgeway Lippincott: "A Legacy of Scientific Innovation", Spectroscopy, June–July 2024, Volume 39, No. 5, at 40-44
- Bill Fateley and Ellis Lippincott: "Remembering the Men Behind the Awards, Bruce Chase and Peter R. Griffiths", Spectroscopy, Volume 28, Issue 2, February 1, 2013
- Melanie L. Fein, Ellis R. Lippincott, Jr., A Scientist for the Golden Age, Partridge Press (2024), a 20-volume biography of Ellis R. Lippincott, Jr., by his daughter. (ISBN 978-1-963587-21-0 and twenty related ISBNs that make up the 20-volume biography)
