= Anvil press =

A multi-anvil press, or anvil press is a type of device related to a machine press that is used to create extraordinarily high pressures within a small volume.

Anvil presses are used in materials science and geology for the synthesis and study the different phases of materials under extreme pressure, as well as for the industrial production of valuable minerals, especially synthetic diamonds, as they mimic the pressures and temperatures that exist deep in the Earth. These instruments allow the simultaneous compression and heating of millimeter size solid phase samples such as rocks, minerals, ceramics, glasses, composite materials, or metals and are capable of reaching pressures above 25 GPa (around 250,000 atmospheres) and temperatures exceeding 2,500 °C. This allows mineral physicists and petrologists studying the Earth's interior to experimentally reproduce the conditions found throughout the lithosphere and upper mantle, a region that spans the near surface to a depth of 700 km. In addition to pressing on the sample, the experiment passes an electric current through a furnace within the assembly to generate temperatures up to 2,200 °C. Although Diamond anvil cells and light-gas guns can access even higher pressures, the multi-anvil apparatus can accommodate much larger samples, which simplifies sample preparation and improves the precision of measurements and the stability of the experimental parameters.

The multi-anvil press is a relatively rare research tool. Lawrence Livermore National Laboratory's two presses have been used for a variety of material property studies, including diffusion and deformation of ceramics and metals, deep-focus earthquake, and the high-pressure stability of mineral phases.

== History ==
The 6-8 multi-anvil apparatus was introduced by Kawai and Endo using a split steel sphere suspended in pressurized oil, later modified to use the hydraulic ram. In 1990, Walker et al. simplified the first compression stage by introducing the removable hatbox design, allowing ordinary machine presses to be converted into multi-anvil systems. A variety of assembly designs have been introduced and standardized including the Walker castable, and the COMPRES assemblies. Recent advances have focused on in-situ measurements, and standardizing materials and calibrations.

== Basic design ==
A typical Kawai cell 8–6 multi-anvil apparatus uses air pumps to pressurize oil, which drives a vertical hydraulic ram to compress a cylindrical cavity known as a hatbox. This cavity is filled with six steel anvils, three facing up and three facing down, that converge on a set of eight tungsten carbide cubes. The interior corners of these cubes truncated to fit an octahedral assembly. These octahedra range from 8 mm to 25 mm on edge and are typically composed of magnesium oxide or another material that deforms ductilely over the range of experimental conditions, to make sure the experiment is under hydrostatic stress. As this assembly is compressed, it extrudes out between the cubes, forming a gasket. A cylinder is drilled out between two opposite faces to accommodate the experiment. Experiments that require heating are surrounded by a cylindrical graphite or lanthanum chromite cylinder furnace, which can produce considerable heat by electrical resistance. However, the graphite furnace can be troublesome at higher pressures due to its tendency to transform into diamond. The DIA multi-anvil is the main alternative to the Kawai cell: it uses six anvils to compress a cubic sample.

== Theory ==
In principle, the multi-anvil press is similar in design to a machine press except that it uses force magnification to amplify pressure by reducing the area over which force is applied:

$$P=\frac{F}{A}$$

This is analogous to the mechanical advantage utilized by a lever, except the force is applied linearly, instead of angularly. For example, a typical multi-anvil could apply 9,806,650 N (equivalent to a load of 1000 t) onto a 10 mm octahedral assembly, which has a surface area of 346.41 mm2, to produce a pressure of 28.31 GPa inside the sample, while the pressure in the hydraulic ram is a mere 0.3 GPa. Therefore, using smaller assemblies can increase the pressure in the sample. The load that can be applied is limited by the compressive yield strength of the tungsten carbide cubes, especially for heated experiments. Even higher pressures, up to 90 GPa, have been achieved by using 14 mm sintered diamond cubes instead of tungsten carbide.

== Measurements in the Multi-Anvil ==
Most sample analysis is conducted after the experiment is quenched and removed from the multi-anvil. However, it is also possible to perform measurements in-situ. Circuits, including thermocouples or pressure variable resistors, can be built into the assembly to accurately measure temperature and pressure. Acoustic interferometry can be used to measure seismic velocities through a material or to infer density of materials. Resistivity can be measured by complex impedance spectroscopy. Magnetic properties can be measured using amplified nuclear magnetic resonance in specially configured multi-anvils. The DIA multi-anvil design often includes diamond or sapphire windows built into the tungsten anvils to allow x-rays or neutrons to penetrate into the sample. This type of device gives researchers at synchrotron and neutron spallation sources the capacity to perform diffraction experiments to measure the structure of samples under extreme conditions. This is essential for observing unquenchable phases of matter because they are kinetically and thermodynamically unstable at low temperatures and pressure. Viscosity and density of high-pressure melts can be measured in-situ using the sink float method and neutron tomography. In this method a sample is implanted with objects, such platinum spheres, that have different density and neutron scattering properties compared to the material surrounding them, and the path of the object is tracked as it sinks, or floats, through the melt. Two objects with contrasting buoyancy can be used simultaneously to calculate the density.

== Applications ==
Pressure, like temperature, is a basic thermodynamic parameter that influences the molecular structure, and thus the electrical, magnetic, thermal, optical and mechanical properties of materials. Devices like the multi-anvil apparatus allow us to observe the effect of high pressure on material structure and properties. Multi-anvil presses are occasionally used in industry to produce minerals of exceptional purity, size and quality, especially high-pressure high-temperature (HPHT) synthetic diamonds and c-Boron-Nitride. However, multi-anvils are high cost devices, and are very adaptable, so they are more often used as scientific instruments. Multi-anvils have three main scientific uses: 1) to synthesize novel high-pressure material; 2) to change the phases of a material; 3) to examine the properties of materials at high pressures. In materials science this includes the synthesis of novel or useful materials with potential mechanical or electronic applications, such as high-pressure super conductors or ultra-hard substances. Geologists are primarily concerned with reproducing the conditions and materials found in the deep earth, to study geological processes that cannot be directly observed. Minerals or rocks are synthesized to find what conditions are responsible for different mineral phases and textures. Geoscientists also use multi-anvils to measure the kinetics of reactions, density, viscosity, compressibility, diffusivity and thermal conductivity of rock under extreme conditions.
