= Iodate nitrate =

Iodate nitrates are mixed anion compounds that contain both iodate and nitrate anions.

== Giant birefringence ==
Iodate nitrates can have high birefringence. The scandium salt has a giant birefringence of 0.348 at 546 nm. When discovered in 2021 it was a record high birefringence for oxyanion compounds, but it was exceeded by CeF_{2}(SO_{4}) just a month later with a value of 0.361 and sodium hydrogen squarate hydrate, NaHC_{4}O_{4}·H_{2}O with a value of 0.52 at 1064 nm. All of these are beaten by hexagonal boron nitride (h-BN) with birefringence of 0.7 in visible light.

== List ==
formula	name	formula weight	system	space group	cell Å	volume	density	comments	ref
Al(IO_{3})_{2}NO_{3}•6H_{2}O	aluminium diiodate nitrate hexahydrate		hexagonal	P321	a=6.764 c=8.09 Z=1				
KIO_{3}•KNO_{3}•2HIO_{3}	dipotassium dihydrogen triiodate nitrate		orthorhombic	P2_{1}2_{1}2_{1}	a=7.109 b=10.638 c=15.5				
Sc(IO_{3})_{2}(NO_{3})	scandium diiodate nitrate	1370.31	trigonal	R32	a=5.3536 c=23.567 Z=1	584.96	3.890	colourless; giant birefringence 0.348 at 546 nm; SHG 4.0×KDP; UV edge 298 nm; stable to 360°C	
In(IO_{3})_{2}(NO_{3})	indium diiodate nitrate	526.63	trigonal	R32	a=5.2165 c=24.195, γ=120° Z=3	570.2	4.601	colourless	
[In(IO_{3})(OH)(H_{2}O)](NO_{3})		386.75	monoclinic	P2_{1}/n	a=5.5756 b=16.410 c=7.734, β=109.95 Z=4	665.2	3.862	colourless	
La(IO_{3})_{2}(NO_{3})	lanthanum diiodate nitrate		trigonal	P3_{1}21	a=7.1002 c=38.177 Z=9			SHG 0.6 × KDP; band gap 4.23 eV	
Ce(IO_{3})_{2}(NO_{3})	cerium diiodate nitrate	551.93	trigonal	P3_{1}21	a=7.0537 c=37.972 Z=9	1639.8	5.030	SHG 1 × KDP	
α-Th(IO_{3})_{2}(NO_{3})(OH)			triclinic	P1̅	a=6.9581 b=7.2294 c=9.8989 α=68.896° β=88.759° γ=66.620°				
β-Th(IO_{3})_{2}(NO_{3})(OH)			orthorhombic	Pbca	a=7.1459 b=14.140 c=16.612				
