= GDX =

GDX may refer to:

- GDx-VCC, a medical diagnostic machine
- Godwari dialect
- libGDX, an open source Java game library
- Sokol Airport, in Magadan, Russia
