= Hydrostatics =

Branch of fluid mechanics that studies fluids at rest

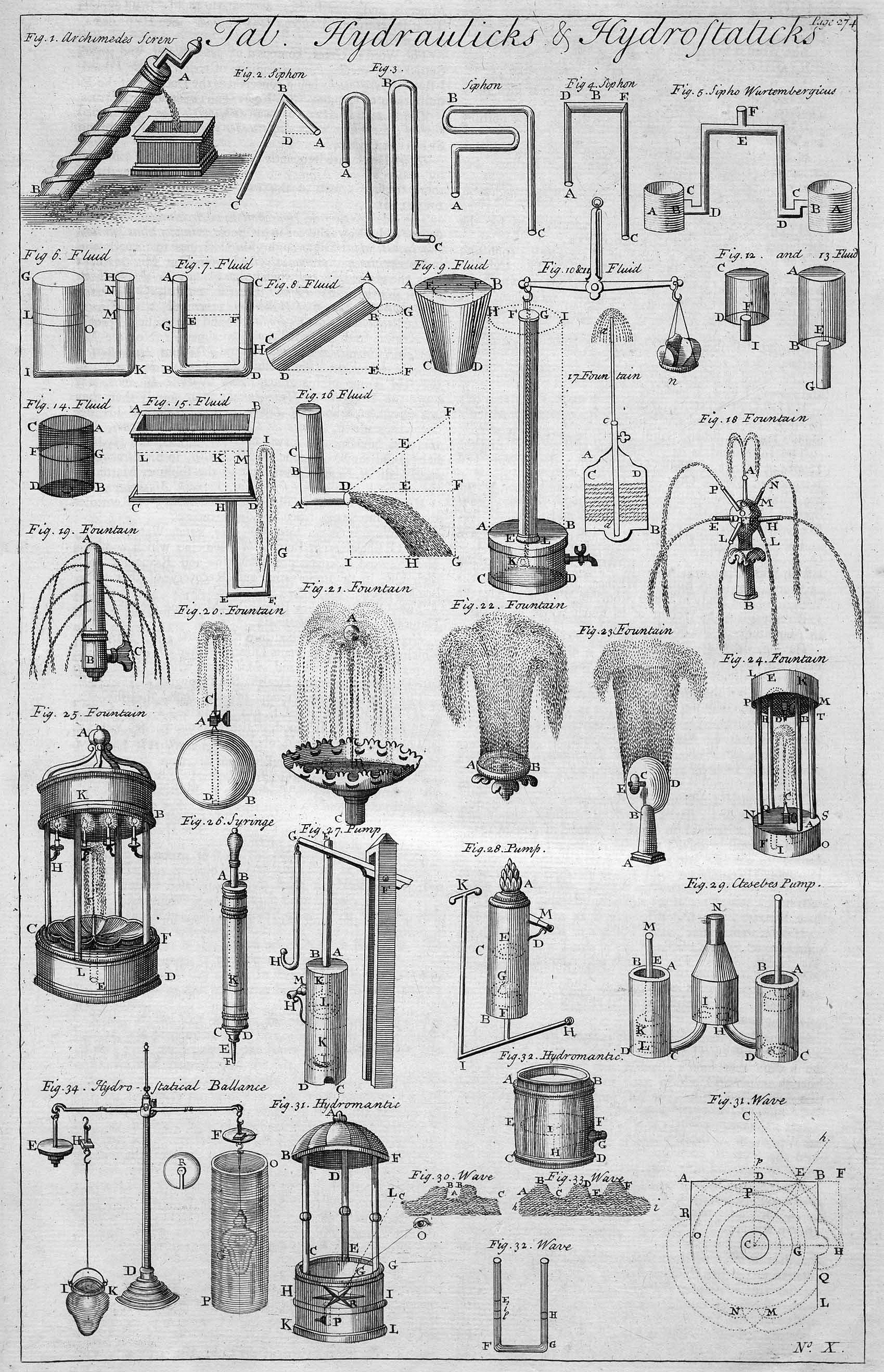
Table of Hydraulics and Hydrostatics, from the 1728 Cyclopædia

Hydrostatics is the branch of fluid mechanics that studies fluids at hydrostatic equilibrium and "the pressure in a fluid or exerted by a fluid on an immersed body". The word "hydrostatics" is sometimes used to refer specifically to water and other liquids, but more often it includes both gases and liquids, whether compressible or incompressible. It encompasses the study of the conditions under which fluids are at rest in stable equilibrium. It is opposed to fluid dynamics, the study of fluids in motion.

Hydrostatics is fundamental to hydraulics, the engineering of equipment for storing, transporting and using fluids. It is also relevant to geophysics and astrophysics (for example, in understanding plate tectonics and the anomalies of the Earth's gravitational field), to meteorology, to medicine (in the context of blood pressure), and many other fields.

Hydrostatics offers physical explanations for many phenomena of everyday life, such as why atmospheric pressure changes with altitude, why wood and oil float on water, and why the surface of still water is always level according to the curvature of the earth.

== History ==
Some principles of hydrostatics have been known in an empirical and intuitive sense since antiquity, by the builders of boats, cisterns, aqueducts and fountains. Archimedes is credited with the discovery of Archimedes' Principle, which relates the buoyancy force on an object that is submerged in a fluid to the weight of fluid displaced by the object. The Roman engineer Vitruvius warned readers about lead pipes bursting under hydrostatic pressure.

The concept of pressure and the way it is transmitted by fluids was formulated by the French mathematician and philosopher Blaise Pascal in 1647.

== Hydrostatics in ancient Greece and Rome ==
=== Pythagorean Cup ===
The "fair cup" or Pythagorean cup, which dates from about the 6th century BC, is a hydraulic technology whose invention is credited to the Greek mathematician and geometer Pythagoras. It was used as a learning tool.

The cup consists of a line carved into the interior of the cup, and a small vertical pipe in the center of the cup that leads to the bottom. The height of this pipe is the same as the line carved into the interior of the cup. The cup may be filled to the line without any fluid passing into the pipe in the center of the cup. However, when the amount of fluid exceeds this fill line, fluid will overflow into the pipe in the center of the cup. Due to the drag that molecules exert on one another, the cup will be emptied.

=== Heron's fountain ===
Heron's fountain is a device invented by Heron of Alexandria that consists of a jet of fluid being fed by a reservoir of fluid. The fountain is constructed in such a way that the height of the jet exceeds the height of the fluid in the reservoir, apparently in violation of principles of hydrostatic pressure. The device consisted of an opening and two containers arranged one above the other. The intermediate pot, which was sealed, was filled with fluid, and several cannula (a small tube for transferring fluid between vessels) connecting the various vessels. Trapped air inside the vessels induces a jet of water out of a nozzle, emptying all water from the intermediate reservoir.

== Pascal's contribution in hydrostatics ==
Pascal made contributions to developments in both hydrostatics and hydrodynamics. Pascal's law is a fundamental principle of fluid mechanics that states that any pressure applied to the surface of a fluid is transmitted uniformly throughout the fluid in all directions, in such a way that initial variations in pressure are not changed.

== Liquids (fluids with free surfaces) ==
Liquids can have free surfaces at which they interface with gases, or with a vacuum. In general, the lack of the ability to sustain a shear stress entails that free surfaces rapidly adjust towards an equilibrium. However, on small length scales, there is an important balancing force from surface tension.

=== Capillary action ===
When liquids are constrained in vessels whose dimensions are small, compared to the relevant length scales, surface tension effects become important leading to the formation of a meniscus through capillary action. This capillary action has profound consequences for biological systems as it is part of one of the two driving mechanisms of the flow of water in plant xylem, the transpirational pull.

=== Hanging drops ===
Without surface tension, drops would not be able to form. The dimensions and stability of drops are determined by surface tension. The drop's surface tension is directly proportional to the cohesion property of the fluid.

== See also ==
- Communicating vessels – Set of internally connected containers containing a homogeneous fluid
- D-DIA – Apparatus used for high pressure and high temperature deformation experiments
- Hydrostatic pressure – Physical quantity
- Hydrostatic test – Non-destructive test of pressure vessels
- Triaxial shear test – Stress test with different levels of stress in each perpendicular direction
