= High pressure =

Great force distributed over a small area

In science and engineering, the study of high pressure examines its effects on materials and the design and construction of devices, such as a diamond anvil cell, which can create high pressure. High pressure usually means pressures of thousands (kilobars) or millions (megabars) of times atmospheric pressure (about 1 bar or 100 kilopascals).

== History and overview ==
Percy Williams Bridgman received a Nobel Prize in 1946 for advancing this area of physics by two magnitudes of pressure (400 megapascals (MPa) to 40 gigapascals (GPa)). The founders of this field include also Harry George Drickamer, Tracy Hall, Francis P. Bundy, Leonid F. Vereschagin, and Sergey M. Stishov.

It was by applying high pressure as well as high temperature to carbon that synthetic diamonds were first produced alongside many other interesting discoveries. Almost any material when subjected to high pressure will compact itself into a denser form; for example, quartz (also called silica or silicon dioxide) will first adopt a denser form known as coesite, then upon application of even higher pressure, form stishovite. These two forms of silica were first discovered by high-pressure experimenters, but then found in nature at the site of a meteor impact.

Chemical bonding is liable to change under high pressure, when the P * V term in the free energy becomes comparable to the energies of typical chemical bonds at around 100 GPa. Among the most striking changes are metallization of oxygen at 96 GPa (rendering oxygen a superconductor), and transition of sodium from a nearly-free-electron metal to a transparent insulator at ~200 GPa. At ultimately high compression, however, all materials will metallize.‍

High pressure has also been shown to drive nitrogen into forming compounds with metals that are otherwise unreactive or only weakly reactive toward it at ambient conditions. For example, silver—a noble metal with no previously known thermodynamically stable nitride—was found to react directly with molecular nitrogen above 118 GPa and 2000 K in a laser-heated diamond anvil cell, forming silver pentazolate (AgN_{5}). Similarly, tungsten reacts with nitrogen at 35–56 GPa to form the ultra-incompressible nitrides W_{2}N_{3} and W_{3}N_{5}, both of which are recoverable to ambient pressure, and beryllium reacts with nitrogen near 85 GPa to form BeN_{4}, which on decompression transforms into a van der Waals–layered material, beryllonitrene, predicted to host anisotropic Dirac fermions.

High-pressure experimentation has led to the discovery of the types of minerals which are believed to exist in the deep mantle of the Earth, such as silicate perovskite, which is thought to make up half of the Earth's bulk, and post-perovskite, which occurs at the core-mantle boundary and explains many anomalies inferred for that region.

== Pressure "landmarks" ==
- Typical pressures reached by large-volume presses: up to 30–40 GPa
- Pressures that can be generated inside diamond anvil cells: ~1000 GPa‍
- Pressure at center of the Earth: 364 GPa
- Highest pressures ever achieved in shock waves: over 100 terapascals (100,000 GPa)‍

== See also ==
- Metallization pressure – Amount of pressure required for a non-metallic chemical element to become a metal
- Synthetic diamond – Diamond created by controlled processes
- D-DIA – Apparatus used for high pressure and high temperature deformation experiments
- Extreme pressure additive
