= D-DIA =

Apparatus used for high pressure and high temperature deformation experiments

The D-DIA or deformation-DIA is an apparatus used for high pressure and high temperature deformation experiments. The advantage of this apparatus is the ability to apply pressures up to approximately 15 GPa while independently creating uniaxial strains up to 50%.

== Theory ==
The D-DIA utilizes the same principle that other high pressure apparatuses (such as the diamond anvil cell) use to create elevated pressure on a specimen.

Pressure = Force/area

By generating a force, in the case of the D-DIA through a hydraulic ram, a greater force can then be applied to the sample by decreasing the area of the anvils on the end that are in contact with the sample assembly.

== Design ==
The D-DIA is based on the similar DIA, which is a cubic-anvil apparatus. The D-DIA is a type of multi-anvil deformation apparatus that uses 6 cubically arranged anvils to provide independent pressurization and deformation of the sample. Four anvils of the cubic arrangement are oriented in the horizontal opposing at 90°, and the remaining two anvils are oriented in the vertical within two guide blocks. The back side of each horizontal anvil comprises two faces of a virtual octahedron. By the symmetry imposed from the advancing guide blocks and anvils, all axes of the virtual octahedron are then strained equally and thus provide hydrostatic pressure to the sample. In order to create a deviatoric stress, oil is pumped using two differential rams behind the top and bottom anvils located within the guide blocks allowing them to advance independent of the other four. By advancing just one anvil pair, a deviatoric stress is created thus altering the previously cubic stress field to one that is tetragonal. The induced flow is approximately axially-symmetric with respect to the cylindrical sample). By advancing an anvil pair pressure would begin to increase on the sample as deformation progresses, but the D-DIA has the capability of bleeding off oil from the main ram (which engages the guide blocks) while advancing the differential pumps, in order to maintain a constant sample pressure during deformation.

== Sample assembly ==
There are multiple designs of sample assemblies that are currently used in the D-DIA. The various sample assembly designs use different materials in their construction to accomplish different goals, but all contain the same common elements: internal resistive heater, pressure medium and upper/lower pistons.

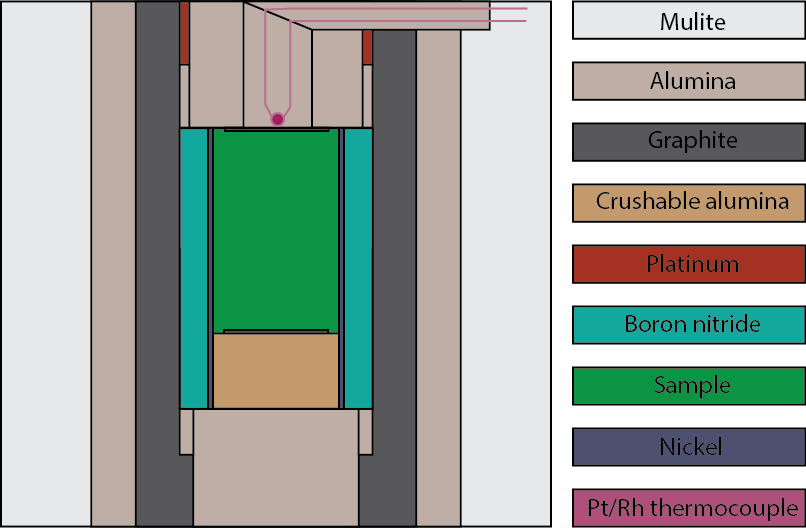
Example D-DIA assembly

The overall shape of the sample assembly is a cube (typically around 6mm), this shape allows for each of the 6 anvils to make contact with each face of the sample assembly. The outer portion of the sample assembly is the pressure medium, which is commonly either boron epoxy (BE) or mullite. The choice of pressure medium used in the sample assembly depends on the ultimate goal of the experiment. Boron epoxy is a self gasketing material in the D-DIA, which means it can produce a seal between all the anvils during deformation, but it has been shown to impart a significant amount of water to the sample during the experiment. This added water to the sample makes it impossible to conduct rheology experiments under anhydrous conditions. The other pressure medium material, mullite, leaves the sample very dry, but does not have the ability to self-gasket in the D-DIA. For this reason, when mullite is used as a pressure medium it needs to be used in combination with a gasket material. Typically the gasket material used is pyrophyllite, and the mullite will be machined into a sphere which sits in pyrophyllite "seats", forming a cube.

In the sample assembly, inboard of the pressure medium and surrounding the sample is an internal resistive heater. The heater is a sleeve which the cylindrical sample fits into, and typically is made of graphite, or can also be made of different types of metal.

In deformation experiments pistons are needed on either side of the sample. Alumina is commonly used as it is harder than most sample materials, allowing deformation of the sample.

Another design element that can be included into the sample assembly is a thermocouple. Thermocouples can be placed either as side entry (one that enters the center of the cube from and edge) or can be a top entry thermocouple (one that enters the top face). In the case of the top entry thermocouple, it can be simultaneously be used as the top piston, but the temperature is being read far from the sample center. The side entry thermocouple reads the temperature closer to the sample center, but the placement usually involves a hole to be drilled in the middle of the furnace, altering the heating characteristics of the furnace. To avoid both downside associated with wither thermocouple some sample assemblies do not use a thermocouple; temperature is instead either calibrated from the relationship of watts vs. temperature or calculated using the known pressure and calculated sample volume from in-situ x-ray diffraction data.

== X-ray diffraction abilities ==
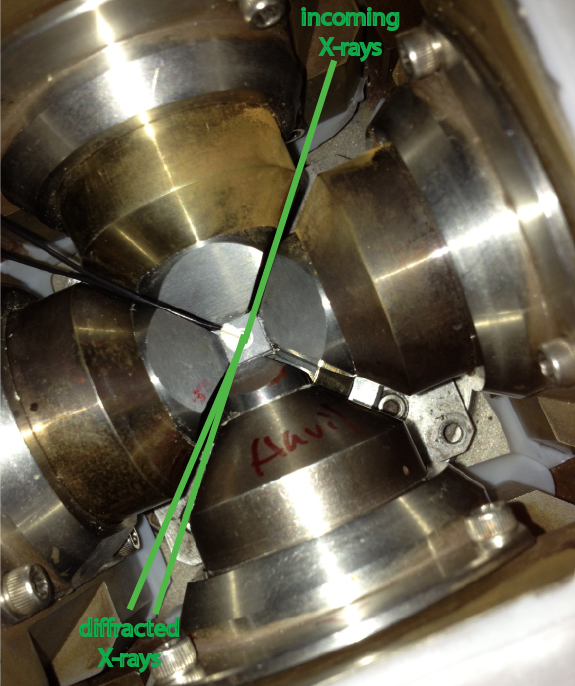
X-ray path through the DDIA assembly

The design of the anvils used in the D-DIA allows for the transmission of synchrotron X-ray radiation through the sample. This X-ray data can be used for both in-situ stress and strain measurements to be taken during the deformation of the sample.

=== Strain ===
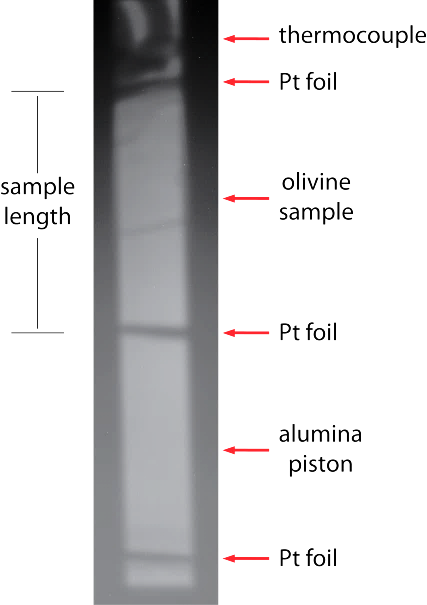
Example X-ray radiograph of a sample in the D-DIA

In-situ [strain] measurements can be made by collecting and analyzing X-ray radiographs. Typically this is achieved by utilizing a fluorescent yttrium aluminum garnet (YAG) crystal in combination with a charge-coupled device (CCD) camera. By placing metal foils (typically platinum or nickel) on the top and bottom of the sample, the total sample length can be easily observed in the x-ray radiographs during the deformation experiment. Using the initial length measurement and subsequent length measurements during deformation, the following relation can be used to calculate strain.

ε = (L_{0} – L)/L_{0}

Where strain is equal to the difference of the initial and final length, divided by the initial length.

=== Stress ===
The determination of stress is made utilizing data gathered from in-situ [x-ray diffraction]. Diffraction data is used to determine the d-spacing of certain crystallographic planes within the sample and from these values of d-spacing there exists various ways to determine the stress state. A common way of calculating the differential stress inside the polycrystal utilizes the d-spacing values measured in the radial and axial directions of the cylindrical sample. This technique takes advantage of the cylindrically symmetric stress field that is imposed by the D-DIA, but also requires the assumption of a Reuss state (or isostress state) of stress throughout each grain in the polycrystal. The other common technique of deviatoric stress determination utilizes differential lattice strains and single crystal elastic constants. In this method the lattice strain is first calculated using measured values d-spacing dm(hkl), as well as d-spacing values determined under hydrostatic conditions dp(hkl). ε_{D}(hkl) = [d_{m}(hkl)- d_{p}(hkl)] / d_{p}(hkl)

Once the lattice strains are calculated, the product of these values and the x-ray shear modulus, also known as the diffraction elastic constant GR(HKL), provides the stress on different lattice planes, τ (HKL).

τ(HKL) = [(2G_{R}(HKL)] ε_{D}(hkl)
