= Scanning laser polarimetry =

- Purpose: measure the thickness of the retinal nerve fiber layer
- MeSH: D057109

In ophthalmology, scanning laser polarimetry is the use of a narrow beam of polarised light to measure the thickness of the nerve fiber layer of the retina (RNFL), the first part of the eye to be damaged by glaucoma.

== GDx instrument ==
The basic GDx instrument uses a GaAIAs diode laser as a source of light. This diode will emit polarized light. The source is HeNe (632.8 nm) and argon (514 nm).

A polarization modulator in this instrument changes the polarization states of the laser output. The linearly polarized beam from the laser then passes through a rotating quarter-wave retarder.

A scanning unit in this instrument is used to move the beam horizontally and vertically on the retina. The focused beam is 35μm in diameter.

This instrument also has a polarization detector. It is used to detect polarized light that is reflected back from the cornea. It is also used to analyze the change in the polarization of the reflected radiation. This element consists of a second synchronously rotating quarter-wave retarder and a linear polarizer in front of the photo-detector. The output is then sampled, digitized, and stored by a computer.

== Concept of the instrument ==
The GDx nerve fiber analyzers measure the retinal nerve fiber layer (RNFL) thickness with a scanning laser polarimeter based on the birefringent properties of the RNFL. Measurement is obtained from a band 1.75 disc diameters concentric to the disc.

It projects a polarized beam of a light into the eye. As this light passes through the NFL tissue, it changes and slow. The detectors measure the change and convert it into thickness units that are graphically displayed. The GDx measure modulation around an ellipse just outside the optics disc and ratios of the thickest points either superiorly or inferiorly to the temporal or nasal regions.

The field of view is 15 degree and imaging should be performed through undilated pupil. The polarized laser scans the fundus and building a monochromatic image. The state of polarization of the light is change (retardation) as it passes through birefringent tissue (cornea and RNFL).Corneal birefringent is eliminated (in part) by a proprietary 'corneal compensator'. The amount of retardation of light reflected from the fundus is converted to RNFL thickness.

In Retinal scanning laser polarimetry (SLP), the cornea, lens, and retina are all treated as linear retarders (optical elements that introduce retardation to an illuminating beam).A linear retarder has a slow axis and a fast axis, and the two axes are orthogonal to each other. Polarized light travels at higher speed when its electric field vector is aligned with the fast axis of a retarder.In contrast, polarized light travels at lower speed when its electric field vector is aligned with the slow axis of a retarder.

== Optical System ==
In the model, the measuring beam passed through three linear retarders: the corneal compensator (CC), the cornea (C), and a uniform radial retarder (R), that represented birefringent regions in the retina (e.g., peripapillary RNFL or macula). And polarization-preserving reflector (PPR).

=== Retarders ===
Firstly, the retardation (i.e., the change in polarization) is proportional to the RNFL thickness. In this instrument, there are four retarders in the measurement beam's path: 1. The first two linear retarders have equal retardance and form a VCC. 2. The third linear retarder is the combination of cornea and lens—the anterior segment 3. The fourth linear retarder, with radially distributed axes, is the retinal birefringent structure (RE; either peripapillary RNFL or the Henle fiber.

As polarized light passes through a form-birefringent medium, one of the two component waves traveling at 90 to each other becomes retarded relative to the other. The degree of the resulting phase shift is directly proportional to the number of microtubules the light passes through, which in turn, is directly proportional to RNFL thickness. The figure above illustrates this process.

The RNFL isn't the only form-birefringent structure in the eye. Anterior segment structures, such as the cornea, also phase-shift polarized light. So the latest instrument includes a compensating device or compensating corneal which is designed to remove the portion of the signal generated by the anterior segment.

This device consists of two optical retarders, which when rotated relative to each other, allow the operator to set the compensator to any value between 0 nm and 120 nm. Rotating the device to any axis can compensate for anterior segment birefringence in any orientation up to 120 nm in magnitude.

The slow axis of R was oriented radially, and distance around R was measured from the horizontal nasal meridian by angle β. At each point, therefore, the fast axis of R was R = β + 90°. Radial variation in retardance was not analyzed. The measuring beam was reflected at a deeper layer and traveled back through the three retarders to the ellipsometer.

Reflection from the ocular fundus exhibits a high degree of polarization preservation, and the reflector in the model (polarization-preserving reflector [PPR]) was assumed to preserve completely the polarization state of the incident beam, except for a 180° phase change due to the reversal in direction. Each optical component in the model experienced a double pass of the measuring beam.

== Clinical interpretation ==
Clinical Interpretation based on results from GDx Nerve Fiber Analyzer from Carl Zeiss Meditec.

Firstly, this instrument is used to measure thickness of nerve fiber layer in our retina. But, GDx give monochromatic image. Then this system will analyze and give colors for certain various thicknesses.

Presents RNFL thickness in colour with thick regions in red and yellow and thin regions in blue and green.

For healthy eye, the image will show yellow and red colour in superior and inferior at NFL regions. But, in glaucoma, the image is absence of red and yellow colours. Superiorly and inferiorly more uniform blue appearance. Picture indicates that the eye is at the advance stage of the disease.

=== Deviation map ===
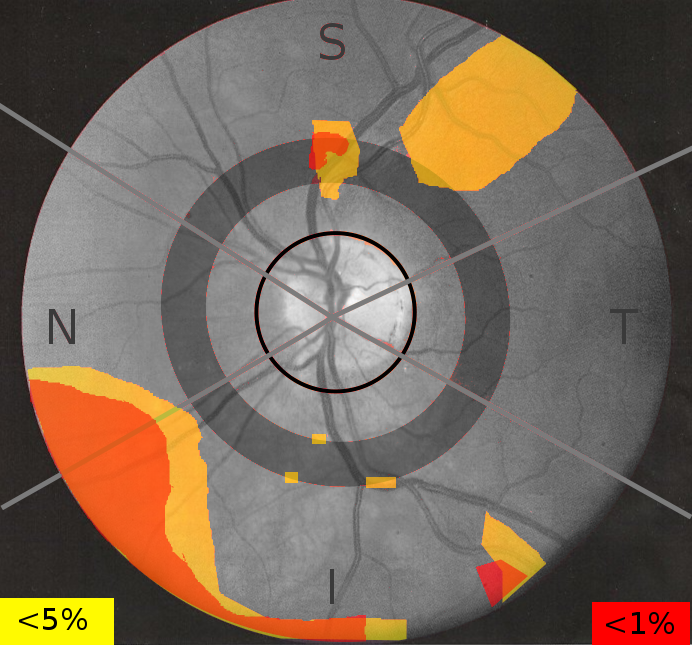
GDx - Deviation map

TSNIT graph

The deviation map reveals the location and magnitude of RNFL thinning relative to a normal value. This normal value was generated as an average of people from various cultures. Defects are colour-coded based on probability of normality (e.g. yellow means that the probability is below 5% of that RNFL at that location is normal). A healthy eye has a clear deviation map.

A further representation is the TSNIT graph. TSNIT is stand for Temporal – Superior – Nasal – Inferior-Temporal. This graph displays the thickness values along the Calculation Circle from T to S, N and back to T. The area of normal values is shaded. Measurements for the left eye are labeled "OS", those for the right eye "OD". A defect is indicated if a measured value falls below the shaded area.

A comprehensive database is essential for accurate glaucoma detection. In this instrument a database from 540 normal eyes is used. The subjects are multi-ethnic and 18–82 years old. The database also contains 262 glaucomatous eyes used by the NFI to discriminate between normal and glaucoma.

== History ==
In the 1980s, it was established that atrophy (thinning) of the retinal nerve fibre layer could be detected before a patient developed visual field defects.

The first commercially-available scanning laser polarimetry device was released in 1992. Early devices used fixed values to compensate for corneal birefringence. Variable corneal compensation was introduced in 2002.
