= Index ellipsoid =

Aspect of crystal optics

In crystal optics, the index ellipsoid (also known as the optical indicatrix or sometimes as the dielectric ellipsoid) is a geometric construction which concisely represents the refractive indices and associated polarizations of light, as functions of the orientation of the wavefront, in a doubly-refractive crystal (provided that the crystal does not exhibit optical rotation). When this ellipsoid is cut through its center by a plane parallel to the wavefront, the resulting intersection (called a central section or diametral section) is an ellipse whose major and minor semiaxes have lengths equal to the two refractive indices for that orientation of the wavefront, and have the directions of the respective polarizations as expressed by the electric displacement vector D. The principal semiaxes of the index ellipsoid are called the principal refractive indices.

It follows from the sectioning procedure that each principal semiaxis of the ellipsoid is generally not the refractive index for propagation in the direction of that semiaxis, but rather the refractive index for propagation perpendicular to that semiaxis, with the D vector parallel to that semiaxis (and parallel to the wavefront). Thus the direction of propagation (normal to the wavefront) to which each principal refractive index applies is in the plane perpendicular to the associated principal semiaxis.

== Terminology ==
The index ellipsoid is not to be confused with the index surface, whose radius vector (from the origin) in any direction is indeed the refractive index for propagation in that direction; for a birefringent medium, the index surface is the two-sheeted surface whose two radius vectors in any direction have lengths equal to the major and minor semiaxes of the diametral section of the index ellipsoid by a plane normal to that direction.

If we let $n_\text{a}, n_\text{b}, n_\text{c}$ denote the principal semiaxes of the index ellipsoid, and choose a Cartesian coordinate system in which these semiaxes are respectively in the $x$, $y$, and $z$ directions, the equation of the index ellipsoid is

$\frac{x^2}{n_\text{a}^2}+\frac{y^2}{n_\text{b}^2}+\frac{z^2}{n_\text{c}^2}=1\,.$	1

If the index ellipsoid is triaxial (meaning that its principal semiaxes are all unequal), there are two cutting planes for which the diametral section reduces to a circle. For wavefronts parallel to these planes, all polarizations are permitted and have the same refractive index, hence the same wave speed. The directions normal to these two planes—that is, the directions of a single wave speed for all polarizations—are called the binormal axes or optic axes, and the medium is therefore said to be biaxial. (Note: Or, in older literature, biaxal.) Thus, paradoxically, if the index ellipsoid of a medium is triaxial, the medium itself is called biaxial.

If two of the principal semiaxes of the index ellipsoid are equal (in which case their common length is called the ordinary index, and the third length the extraordinary index), the ellipsoid reduces to a spheroid (ellipsoid of revolution), and the two optic axes merge, so that the medium is said to be uniaxial. (Note: Or, in older literature, uniaxal.) As the index ellipsoid reduces to a spheroid, the two-sheeted index surface constructed therefrom reduces to a sphere and a spheroid touching at opposite ends of their common axis, which is parallel to that of the index ellipsoid; but the principal axes of the spheroidal index ellipsoid and the spheroidal sheet of the index surface are interchanged. In the well-known case of calcite, for example, the index ellipsoid is an oblate spheroid, so that one sheet of the index surface is a sphere touching that oblate spheroid at the equator, while the other sheet of the index surface is a prolate spheroid touching the sphere at the poles, with an equatorial radius (extraordinary index) equal to the polar radius of the oblate spheroidal index ellipsoid. (Note: Yariv & Yeh (1984, pp. 86–87) give an example of the contrary kind, in which the index surface is prolate (Figure 4.4), and the associated index surface (which they call the "normal surface") comprises a sphere and an oblate spheroid touching at the poles. In both examples the proportions of the extraordinary wavefront expanding from a point source in the crystal are inverse to those of the index surface, because the refractive index is inversely proportional to the normal velocity of the wavefront.)

If all three principal semi-axes of the index ellipsoid are equal, it reduces to a sphere: all diametral sections of the index ellipsoid are circular, whence all polarizations are permitted for all directions of propagation, with the same refractive index for all directions, and the index surface merges with the (spherical) index ellipsoid; in short, the medium is optically isotropic. Cubic crystals exhibit this property as well as amorphous transparent media such as glass and water.

== History ==
A surface analogous to the index ellipsoid can be defined for the wave speed (normal to the wavefront) instead of the refractive index. Let n denote the length of the radius vector from the origin to a general point on the index ellipsoid. Then dividing equation (1) by n^{2} gives

$\frac{\cos^2\xi}{n_\text{a}^2}+\frac{\cos^2\eta}{n_\text{b}^2}+\frac{\cos^2\zeta}{n_\text{c}^2} = \frac{1}{n^2}\,,$	2

where $\cos\xi$, $\cos\eta$, and $\cos\zeta$ are the direction cosines of the radius vector. But n is also the refractive index for a wavefront parallel to a diametral section of which the radius vector is major or minor semiaxis. If that wavefront has speed $v$, we have $n=c_0/v$, where $c_0$ is the speed of light in vacuum. (Note: Or sometimes it is convenient to use air instead of vacuum as the reference medium; cf. Zernike & Midwinter, 1973, p. 2.) For the principal semiaxes of the index ellipsoid, for which n takes the values $n_\text{a}, n_\text{b,} n_\text{c},$ let $v$ take the values a,b,c, respectively, so that $n_\text{a}=c_0/a,$ $n_\text{b}=c_0/b,$ and $n_\text{c}=c_0/c$. Making these substitutions in (2) and canceling the common factor $c_0^2$, we obtain

$v^2=a^2\cos^2\xi+b^2\cos^2\eta+c^2\cos^2\zeta\,.$	3

This equation was derived by Augustin-Jean Fresnel in January 1822. If $v$ is the length of the radius vector, the equation describes a surface with the property that the major and minor semiaxes of any diametral section have lengths equal to the wave-normal speeds of wavefronts parallel to that section, and the directions of what Fresnel called the "vibrations" (which we now recognize as oscillations of D).

Whereas the surface described by (1) is in index space (in which the coordinates are dimensionless numbers), the surface described by (3) is in velocity space (in which the coordinates have the units of velocity). Whereas the former surface is of the 2nd degree, the latter is of the 4th degree, as may be verified by redefining $x,y,z$ as the components of velocity and putting $\cos\xi=x/v$, etc.; thus the latter surface (3) is generally not an ellipsoid, but another sort of ovaloid. And as the index ellipsoid generates the index surface, so the surface (3), by the same process, generates what we call the normal-velocity surface. (Note: That is, the surface whose radius vector in any direction is the wave-normal velocity in that direction. Jenkins & White (1976, pp. 555–556) call this the normal-velocity surface. Born & Wolf (2002, p. 803) call it the normal surface. But Yariv & Yeh (1984) use the term normal surface for the index surface (p. 87) or the corresponding surface for the wave vector k (p. 73).) Hence the surface (3) might reasonably be called the "normal-velocity ovaloid". Fresnel, however, called it the surface of elasticity, because he derived it by supposing that light waves were transverse elastic waves, that the medium had three perpendicular directions in which a displacement of a molecule produced a restoring force in exactly the opposite direction, and that the restoring force due to a vector sum of displacements was the vector sum of the restoring forces due to the separate displacements.

Fresnel soon realized that the ellipsoid constructed on the same principal semi-axes as the surface of elasticity has the same relation to the ray velocities that the surface of elasticity has to the wave-normal velocities. Fresnel's ellipsoid is now called the ray ellipsoid. Thus, in modern terms, the ray ellipsoid generates the ray velocities as the index ellipsoid generates the refractive indices. The major and minor semiaxes of the diametral section of the ray ellipsoid are in the permitted directions of the electric field vector E.

The term index surface was coined by James MacCullagh in 1837. In a previous paper, read in 1833, MacCullagh had called this surface the "surface of refraction" and shown that it is generated by the major and minor semiaxes of a diametral section of an ellipsoid which has principal semiaxes inversely proportional to those of Fresnel's ellipsoid, and which MacCullagh later called the "ellipsoid of indices". In 1891, Lazarus Fletcher called this ellipsoid the optical indicatrix.

== Electromagnetic interpretation ==
Deriving the index ellipsoid and its generating property from electromagnetic theory is non-trivial. Given the index ellipsoid, however, we can easily relate its parameters to the electromagnetic properties of the medium.

The speed of light in vacuum is
$$c_0=1\big/\sqrt{\mu_0\epsilon_0}\,,$$
where $\mu_0$ and $\epsilon_0$ are respectively the magnetic permeability and the electric permittivity of the vacuum. For a transparent material medium, we can still reasonably assume that the magnetic permeability is $\mu_0$ (especially at optical frequencies), but $\epsilon_0$ must be replaced by $\epsilon_\text{r}\epsilon_0\;\!,$ where $\epsilon_\text{r}$ is the relative permittivity (also called the dielectric constant), so that the wave speed becomes
$$v=1\big/\sqrt{\mu_0\epsilon_\text{r}\epsilon_0}\,.$$
Dividing $c_0$ by $v$, we obtain the refractive index:
$$n=\sqrt{\epsilon_\text{r}}\,.$$
This derivation treats $\epsilon_\text{r}$ as a scalar, which is valid in an isotropic medium. In an anisotropic medium, the result holds only for those combinations of propagation direction and polarization which avoid the anisotropy—that is, for those cases in which the electric displacement vector D is parallel to the electric field vector E, as in an isotropic medium. In view of the symmetry of the index ellipsoid, these must be the cases in which D is in the direction of one of the axes. So, denoting the relative permittivities in the $x$, $y$, and $z$ directions by $\epsilon_x\;\!,\epsilon_y,\epsilon_z$ (the so-called principal dielectric constants), and recalling that $n_\text{a}, n_\text{b}, n_\text{c}$ denote the refractive indices for these directions of D, we must have
$$n_\text{a}=\sqrt{\epsilon_x} ~;~~
n_\text{b}=\sqrt{\epsilon_y} ~;~~
n_\text{c}=\sqrt{\epsilon_z} ~,$$
indicating that the semiaxes of the index ellipsoid are the square roots of the principal dielectric constants. Substituting these expressions into (1), we obtain the equation of the index ellipsoid in the alternative form
$$\frac{x^2}{\epsilon_x}+\frac{y^2}{\epsilon_y}+\frac{z^2}{\epsilon_z}=1\,,$$
which explains why it is also called the dielectric ellipsoid.

== See also ==
- Birefringence
- Complex refractive index
- Crystal optics
- D-DIA
- Mathematical descriptions of opacity

== Bibliography ==
- M. Born and E. Wolf, 2002, Principles of Optics, 7th Ed., Cambridge University Press, 1999 (reprinted with corrections, 2002), ISBN 978-0-521-64222-4.
- A. Fresnel (ed. H. de Senarmont, E. Verdet, and L. Fresnel), 1868, Oeuvres complètes d'Augustin Fresnel, Paris: Imprimerie Impériale (3 vols., 1866–70), vol. 2 (1868).
- F.A. Jenkins and H.E. White, 1976, Fundamentals of Optics, 4th Ed., New York: McGraw-Hill, ISBN 0-07-032330-5.
- L.D. Landau and E.M. Lifshitz (tr. J.B. Sykes & J.S. Bell), 1960, Electrodynamics of Continuous Media (vol. 8 of Course of Theoretical Physics), London: Pergamon Press.
- A. Yariv and P. Yeh, 1984, Optical Waves in Crystals: Propagation and control of laser radiation, New York: Wiley, ISBN 0-471-09142-1.
- F. Zernike and J.E. Midwinter, 1973, Applied Nonlinear Optics, New York: Wiley (reprinted Mineola, NY: Dover, 2006).
