= Giant birefringence =

When values of birefringence are very high, the property is termed giant birefringence which more generically is called giant optical anisotropy. Values for giant birefringence exceed 0.3. Much bigger numbers (over 2.0) are termed "colossal birefringence" which are achieved using nanostructures.

Some oxides, for example borate or iodate can have high birefringence. Also compounds containing C=O bonds have higher levels. These include oxalates, squarates and cyanurates. One trade-off is with band gap. If the band gap is small, then the material is not transparent to visible light, but can be transparent for infrared. Chalgogenides may have high birefringence, but only in the infrared. Halide perovskites such as CsPbBr_{x}Cl_{3−x} have fairly high birefringence that varies significantly in the optical spectrum.

Polar organic π-conjugated molecules can have a strong response to electric fields and also form flat molecules that can stack to form anisotropic crystals with high birefringence.

Some transition metal oxyhalides: MoOCl_{4}, WOCl_{4}, have birefringence in the giant category and MoO_{2}Br_{2}, WOBr_{4}, NbOBr_{2}, and NbOI_{2} are predicted to have birefringence over 0.6 at 1065 nm.

== Applications ==
Applications of materials with high birefringence include beam splitters, waveplates, optical circulators, and in some nonlinear optics systems.

== List ==
substance	formula	birefringence	band gap eV	comment	reference
copper indium thiophosphate	CuInP_{2}S_{6}	0.3@647 nm 0.5@280 nm	2.8	pyroelectric	
4-aminopyridinium difluoroiodate	(C_{5}N_{2}H_{7})IO_{2}F_{2}	0.30 @ 550 nm	4.06		
H_{2}biim = 2,2′-biimidazole; 2,2′-biimidazolium bromide tribromogermanate(II)	(H_{4}biimBr)GeBr_{3}	0.302@546			
bis(1,10-phenanthrolin-1-ium) hexabromotellurate	(C_{12}H_{9}N_{2})_{2}TeBr_{6}	0.31@546 nm			
isoquinolinium-3-carboxylic acid chloride	[C_{10}H_{8}NO_{2}]Cl	0.31@550 nm			
	Rb_{2}Sn_{2}F_{5}Cl	0.31@532 nm			
melaminium methylsulfonate hdyrate	(C_{3}N_{6}H_{7})SO_{3}CH_{3}·H_{2}O	0.31@546		UV edge 233 nm	
dipotassium trithiocyanurate sesqihydrate	K_{2}HC_{3}N_{3}S_{3}·1.5H_{2}O	0.31@550 nm			
potassium 3-pyridinesulfonate	K(3-C_{5}H_{4}NSO_{3})	0.312@546	4.26	UV edge 275 nm	
guanidinium hydrogen squarate	C(NH_{2})_{3}(HC_{4}O_{4})	0.313@546 nm			
	NbSe_{2}I_{2}	0.313			
2,7-diazapyrene:1,2,4,5-tetrafluoro-3,6-diiodobenzene		0.316@546 nm	3.00	blue edge 414 nm	
	LiBF_{2}C_{2}O_{4}	0.317@546 nm			
	CN_{4}H_{7})H_{2}C_{3}N_{3}S_{3}	0.319@546.1 nm		UV edge 336 nm	
barium cyanurate	Ba_{3}(C_{3}N_{3}O_{3})_{2}	0.32@800 nm			
pentazinc dicyanurate tetrahydroxide	Zn_{5}(OH)_{4}(C_{3}N_{3}O_{3})_{2}	0.32@400 nm			
magnesium tetrazinc dicyanurate tetrahydroxide	MgZn_{4}(OH)_{4}(C_{3}N_{3}O_{3})_{2}	0.32@400 nm			
pyridinium antimony oxalate difluoride hydrate	[C(NH_{2})_{3}]Sb(C_{2}O_{4})F_{2}·H_{2}O	0.323@546 nm			
	Cs_{2}Sb_{2}(C_{2}O_{4})_{2}-F_{4}·H_{2}O	0.325@546 nm			
3-bromoquinolinium bromide	C_{9}H_{7}NBrBr	0.328@546 nm			
potassium cadmium tricyanate	K[Cd(NCO)_{3}]	0.329@546 nm		UV edge 228 nm	
melaminium chloride hemihydrate	β-(C_{3}H_{7}N_{6})_{2}Cl_{2}·H_{2}O	0.33@550 nm			
isoquinolinium-3-carboxylic acid nitrate	[C_{10}H_{8}NO_{2}]NO_{3}	0.33@550 nm			
methylguanidine nitrite	[C_{2}N_{3}H_{8}]NO_{2}	0.331@546			
magnesium pyridine dicarboxylate octahydrate	[Mg(H_{2}O)_{6}][(C_{7}H_{4}NO_{4})·H_{2}O]_{2}	0.34@546			
zinc disulfosalicylate octahydrate	(C_{7}H_{5}O_{6}S)_{2}Zn(H_{2}O)_{6}·2H_{2}O	0.34@546			
melaminium sulfamate	C_{3}N_{6}H_{7}SO_{3}NH_{2}	0.340@546 nm		UV edge 206 nm	
1,3-diazapyrene:1,2,4,5-tetrafluoro-3,6-diiodobenzene		0.340@546 nm			
isoquinolinium-1-carboxylic acid chloride	C_{10}H_{10}ClNO_{3}	0.345@550 nm			
lithium 3-pyridinesulfonate		0.345@546 nm			
	(C_{2}N_{5}H_{8})_{3}(H_{2}C_{3}N_{3}S_{3})(HC_{3}N_{3}S_{3})·H_{2}O	0.347@550 nm			
scandium diiodate nitrate	Sc(IO_{3})_{2}(NO_{3})	0.348 at 546 nm			
potassium indium tetra(iso-cyamelurate) octadecahydrate	K_{0.5}In_{0.5}(H_{2}C_{6}N_{7}O_{3})_{2}·9H_{2}O	0.35@1064 nm	4.05		
calcium squarate	CaC_{4}O_{4}	0.35@1064			
tristrontium dicyanurate	β-Sr_{3}(C_{3}N_{3}O_{3})	0.35			
	Hg_{4}InS_{2}Cl_{5}	0.35@546 nm	3.10		
protonated 3,5-dipicolinic acid iodate	C_{7}H_{4}NO_{4}(IO_{3})	0.35@546 nm	4.12	SHG 3.6 × KDP	
	RbHg_{5}Br_{11}	0.35@546 nm	3.73		
potassium indium tetraiso-cyamelurate : octadecahydrate	K_{0.5}In_{0.5}(H_{2}C_{6}N_{7}O_{3})_{2}·9H_{2}O	0.35@1064 nm	4.05		
potassium tetraiodatoiodate(III) iodate(V)	K_{2}[I^{III}(I^{V}O_{3})_{4}]I^{V}O_{3}	0.358@543 nm		SHG 21.6 × KDP at 1.064 μm; UV edge 370 nm	
4-cyanopyridinium mercury trichloride	(C_{6}H_{5}N_{2})HgCl_{3}	0.36 at 546 nm		SHG 3.04 × KDP at 1.064 μm	
isoquinolinium-1-carboxylic acid bromide	C_{10}H_{8}BrNO_{2}	0.36@550 nm			
sodium tricyanomethanide	NaC(CN)_{3}	0.36@550 nm	3.88	triclinic; density 1.526	
cerium difluoride sulfate	CeF_{2}(SO_{4})	0.361			
lithium nitrate monohydrate : 4-hydroxypyridine		0.362@546 nm			
	CdCl_{2}(4-Aminopyridine)_{2}	0.368 @ 546 nm	4.26	SHG 5 × KDP	
	Na_{4}Ba_{3}(S_{2})_{4}S_{3}	0.37 at 1064 nm			
1,4-dimethylpiperazinium cadmium trithiocyanate	(C_{6}N_{2}H_{15})Cd(SCN)_{3}	0.37@550		stable be;ow 519K	
melaminium tetrafluoroborate hydrate	(C_{3}N_{6}H_{7})BF_{4}·H_{2}O	0.37@546		UV edge 244 nm	
	Zn(C_{6}H_{4}NO_{2})_{2}·4H_{2}O	0.37@550		UV edge 274 nm	
guanidinium hydrogen oxalate hydrate	[C(NH_{2})_{3}]HC_{2}O_{4}·H_{2}O	0.371@532 nm			
urea nitrate	C(OH)(NH_{2})_{2}NO_{3}	0.372@546 nm			
magnesium nitrate hexahydrate:4-hydroxypyridine	[Mg(NO_{3})_{2}·6H_{2}O]·(4HP)_{2}	0.376@532 nm			
4-aminopyridinium zinc hydrogenphosphite dichloride	(C_{5}H_{7}N_{2})[Zn(H_{2}PO_{3})Cl_{2}]	0.378@546 nm		space group Pccn	
trifluoromethyl(melamine sulfonate)	C_{3}N_{6}H_{7}SO_{3}CF_{3}	0.38@532 nm			
melaminium fluoride hydrate	(C_{3}H_{7}N_{6})F·H_{2}O	0.38@550 nm			
ammonium antimony oxalate difluoride hydrate	NH_{4}Sb(C_{2}O_{4})F_{2}·H_{2}O	0.381@546			
cadmium diiodide:nicotinic acid 1:2	Cd(C_{6}H5NO_{2})_{2}I_{2}	0.388@550 nm	3.94	UV edge 284 nm	
	AgHg_{3}I_{3.2}Cl_{1.8}(SO_{4})	0.39@546 nm		SHG 11.8 × KH_{2}PO_{4}@ 1064 nm	
	(C_{7}H_{10}N)_{3}Bi_{2}I_{9}·I_{2}	0.39@589 nm			
	Cs_{2}Pb_{4}Br_{10}	0.392 @ 550 nm			
4,9-diazapyrene:1,3,5-trifluoro-2,4,6-triiodobenzene		0.394@546	2.92	blue edge 425 nm	
sodium 5-hydroxy-2-pyridinecarboxylate hemihydrate	Na_{2}(C_{6}H_{4}NO_{3})_{2}·H_{2}O	0.394@546		SHG 6.2 × KDP; UV cutoff 282 nm	
bis(3-bromoquinolinium) hexafluorosilicate	(C_{9}H_{7}BrN)_{2}SiF_{6}	0.398@550 nm			
	RbNH_{4}(H_{2}C_{3}N_{3}O_{3})_{2}·2H_{2}O	0.40 @ 1064 nm	5.24		
diantimony difluoride bis(pyridine-2,5-dicarboxylate) dihydrate	(C_{7}H_{3}NO_{4})_{2}Sb_{2}F_{2}·2H_{2}O	0.40@550 nm			
bis(2-amino-5-nitropyridine)zinc dichloride	(C_{5}H_{5}N_{3}O_{2})_{2}ZnCl_{2}	0.40 @514 nm	2.9	NLO χ^{(3)} = 4.442 × 10^{−9} esu; transparent 415–1400 nm; stable < 260°;	
rubidium 2-amino-4,6-dimercapto-S-triazine hemihydrate	Rb_{2}(H_{2}C_{3}N_{4}S_{2})_{2}•H_{2}O	0.400@546		UV edge 318 nm	
3-bromoquinolinium nitrate	C_{9}H_{7}NBrNO_{3}	0.401 @546 nm			
dipotasium hydrogen trithiocyanate hemihydrate	K_{4}(HC_{3}N_{3}S_{3})_{2}·H_{2}O	0.402 @550 nm			
biuret:cyanuric acid:water	[H_{5}C_{2}N_{3}O_{2}][H_{3}C_{3}N_{3}O_{3}]·0.43H_{2}O	0.403@546 nm		UV edge 208 nm	
	(C_{2}N_{5}H_{8})(H_{2}C_{3}N_{3}S_{3})·H_{2}O	0.403@550 nm			
	K_{1.03}(NH_{4})_{0.97}(I_{5}O_{12})(IO_{3})	0.405 @546 nm		SHG 19.5 × KDP @1064 nm	
LCHCY hydroisocyanurate	Li_{2}Ca(H_{2}C_{3}N_{3}O_{3})_{4}·6H_{2}O	0.407@800 nm			
4,9-diazapyrene:1,2,4,5-tetracyanobenzene		0.407@546	2.63	vis edge 471 nm	
	Na_{2}Sn_{2}F_{5}I	0.408@546		Space group P2_{1}/c	
isoquinolinium-1-carboxylic acid bromide water	C_{10}H_{8}BrNO_{2}·H_{2}O	0.41@550 nm			
1,3-diazapyrene:1,3,5-trifluoro-2,4,6-triiodobenzene		0.411@546	3.01	blue edge 411 nm	
guanylurea formate	[C_{2}N_{4}H_{7}O]COOH	0.413@546 nm			
ammonium 2-amino-4,6-dimercapto-S-triazine hemihydrate	(NH_{4})_{2}(H_{2}C_{3}N_{4}S_{2})_{2}•H_{2}O	0.413@546 nm	3.65	UV edge 313 nm; Space group P2_{1}/n (birefrince could be as high as 0.510)	
potassium 2-amino-4,6-dimercapto-S-triazine hemihydrate	K_{2}(H_{2}C_{3}N_{4}S_{2})_{2}•H_{2}O	0.416@546 nm		UV edge 317 nm	
4, 5-dichocyanimidazole	C_{5}N_{4}H_{2}	0.417@546 nm			
guanidinium dihydrogen cyanurate	C(NH_{2})_{3}(H_{2}C_{3}N_{3}O_{3})	0.419@400 nm		UV cutoff 238 nm	
melamine	(C_{6}N_{10}H_{8})Pb_{2}Br_{6}	0.42 at 550 nm			
benzoguanaminium chloride hydrate	(C_{9}H_{10}N_{5})Cl·H_{2}O,	0.42 at 550 nm			
caesium 2-amino-4,6-dimercapto-S-triazine hemihydrate	Cs_{2}(H_{2}C_{3}N_{4}S_{2})_{2}•H_{2}O	0.421@546 nm		UV edge 317 nm	
pyrazine:oxalic acid	(C_{4}N_{2}H_{4})(H_{2}C_{2}O_{4})	0.422 at 550 nm			
guanidinium molybdenyl iodate	C(NH_{2})_{2}MoO_{3}IO_{3}	0.426@546 nm	3.33		
	(NH_{4})_{2}(I_{5}O_{12})(IO_{3})	0.431 @546 nm		SHG 16 × KDP @1064 nm	
melaminium tetrafluoroborate	(C_{3}N_{6}H_{7})BF_{4}	0.44@546 nm			
melaminium tetrafluorohydroxytriborate	[C_{3}N_{6}H_{7}]_{2}[B_{3}O_{3}F_{4}(OH)]	0.440@546		UV edge 240 nm	
magnesium pyridine dicarboxylatedihydrate	Mg(C_{7}H_{3}NO_{4})(H_{2}O)_{2}	0.440@546			
4-hydroxypyridine:4-hydroxypyridinium 3-pyridinesulfonate	[(4-HP)(4-H_{2}P)][3-pySO_{3}]	0.443 @546 nm			
	Hg^{I}_{2}Hg^{II}(Te_{2}O_{4})_{2}(HPO_{4})_{2}	0.444 @546 nm			
tripotassium cyamelurate dihydrate	K_{3}C_{6}N_{7}O_{3}·2H_{2}O	0.446@1064 nm			
potassium terephthalate	K_{2}C_{8}H_{4}O_{4}	0.45@546 nm		stable to 580 °C	
nicotinamide sulfamate	(C_{6}H_{7}N_{2}O)(NH_{2}SO_{3})	0.452@535 nm		UV edge 274 nm	
	[H_{2}C_{6}N_{7}(NH_{2})_{3}]SO_{4}·2H_{2}O	0.46@550			
2,7-diazapyrene:1,3,5-trifluoro-2,4,6-triiodobenzene		0.464@546 nm	2.89	blue edge 429 nm	
	Al_{4}(P_{2}S_{6})_{3}	0.47 @ 2050 nm			
2-bromo-pyridinium-4-boronic acid nitrate	[HPyBrB(OH)_{2}]·(NO_{3})	0.477@546 nm			
bis(4-hydroxypyridine)zinc sulfate monohydrate	(C_{5}H_{5}NO)_{2}ZnSO_{4}·H_{2}O	0.48@546 nm			
bis(4-hydroxypyridine)zinc chloride	(p-C_{5}H_{5}NO)_{2}ZnCl_{2}	0.482@546 nm			
disodium (deprotonated 5-hydroxy-2-pyridinecarboxylate) hydrate	Na_{2}(C_{6}H_{3}NO_{3})·H_{2}O	0.487@546 nm		UV edge 321 nm; SHG 14.0 × KDP	
3,5-pyridinedicarboxylic acid		0.49@546 nm			
benzoguanaminium bromide	(C_{9}H_{10}N_{5})Br	0.49@550 nm			
phenyl thiourea mercury dichloride	(C_{7}H_{8}N_{2}S)HgCl_{2}	0.49@546	3.23	UV edge 328 nm	
bis-(3-cyanoquinolinium)hexachlorostannate	(C_{10}H_{9}N_{2}O)_{2}SnCl_{6}	0.50 at 550 nm			
Amidinothiourea tetrafluoroborate	(C_{2}N_{4}H_{7}S)BF_{4}	0.500 at 546 nm			
4-cyanopyridnium hexafluorosilicate	(C_{6}H_{5}N_{2})_{2}SiF_{6}	0.505@546 nm			
4-aminopyridinium barbiturate	[C_{5}H_{7}N_{2}]^{+}[C_{4}H_{3}N_{2}O_{3}]^{−}	0.507 at 546 nm			
9-acridiniumcarboxylic acid bromide	C_{14}H_{10}BrNO_{2}	0.507 at 550 nm			
dipotassium cadmium tetracyanate	K_{2}[Cd(NCO)_{4}]	0.511@546 nm		UV edge 229 nm	
sodium hydrogen squarate hydrate	NaHC_{4}O_{4}·H_{2}O	0.52 at 1064 nm			
	Sr_{4}(VO_{4})_{2}S_{3}	0.52@550 nm			
	HgB_{2}S_{4}	0.52 at 1064 nm			
tricaesium tricyanomelaminate hydrate	Cs_{3}C_{6}N_{9}•H_{2}O	0.52@550 nm			
lithium nitrate monohydrate : 4-hydroxypyridine 1:2		0.522@546 nm			
dipotassium mercuric tetracyanate	K_{2}[Hg(NCO)_{4}]	0.524@546		UV edge 253 nm	
Pyrazinamide iodine monobromide	C_{5}H_{5}N_{3}OIBr	0.524@546	2.32		
molybdenum(VI) pyrotellurite hydrate	Mo(H_{2}O)Te_{2}O_{7}	0.528@546 nm		UV edge 366 nm; SHG 5.4 × KDP	
	Ba_{2}La_{2}Sb_{4}S_{10}(S_{2})	0.53 at 1064 nm	1.86		
2-chloro-pyridinium-4-boronic acid nitrate	[HPyClB(OH)_{2}]·(NO_{3})	0.533@546 nm			
sodium terephthalate	Na_{2}C_{8}H_{4}O_{4}	0.54@546 nm		stable to 580 °C	
	Hg_{4}(Te_{2}O_{5})(SO_{4})	0.542@546 nm			
caesium [4,6-Bis(cyanoamino)-1,3,5-triazin-2-yl]iminomethylideneazanide	CsH_{2}C_{6}N_{9}⋅H_{2}O	0.55@550 nm			
barium dithioselenotellurite	BaTeSeS_{2}	0.55@550 nm		Optical edge 500-25,000 nm	
6-iodoquinazolinium nitrate	C_{8}H_{6}IN_{3}O_{4}	0.55@550 nm			
aminoguanidine trithiocyanurate	(CH_{7}N_{4})(H_{2}C_{3}N_{3}S_{3})	0.558@546			
	CrSbSe_{3}	0.56 at 650 nm			
formamidinium hydrogensquarate	(CH_{5}N_{2})^{+}(HC_{4}O_{4})^{−}	0.568@546 nm	3.44		
benzoguanaminium tetrafluoroborate hydrate	(C_{9}H_{10}N_{5})BF_{4}·H_{2}O	0.57 at 550 nm			
	Cs_{2}S_{6}	0.58@1064 nm			
trithiocyanurate	Cs_{2}Mg(H_{2}C_{3}N_{3}S_{3})_{4}·8H_{2}O	0.58@800 nm		UV cutoff 374 nm	
	ZrTe_{5}	0.58 @ 942 nm			
2,2'-bipyrdinium hexafluorosilicate	(C_{10}H_{10}N_{2})SiF_{6}	0.583@546			
bis[dimethylammonium] dichlorohypoiodite chloride	[HDMA]_{2}[ICl_{2}]·Cl	0.585@546 nm			
4-hydroxypyridinium nitrate	(C_{5}H_{6}ON)^{+}(NO_{3})^{−}	0.593 at 546 nm		SHG 9.55 × KDP; space group P2_{1}/c	
cadmium dicyanurate octahydrate	Cd(H_{2}C_{6}N_{7}O_{3})_{2}·8H_{2}O	0.60 @ 550 nm			
	Rb_{3}[C_{6}N_{7}(NCN)_{3}]·3H_{2}O	>0.60 @ 546		SHG 9×KDP	
	Cs_{3}[C_{6}N_{7}(NCN)_{3}]·3H_{2}O	>0.60 @ 546		SHG 9×KDP	
diberyllium dihydroxide pyridine-2,5-carboxylate dihydrate	[Be_{2}(μ-OH)_{2}(C_{7}H_{3}NO_{4})(H_{2}O)]·H_{2}O	0.6@270 nm	4.75	UV edge 261 nm	
tripotassium hydronium tetrathiocyanurate tetrahydrate	K_{3}(H_{2}C_{3}N_{3}S_{3})_{4}(H_{3}O)·4H_{2}O	0.604@546 nm			
melem phosphate	C_{6}N_{7}(NH_{2})_{3}·H_{3}PO_{4}	0.609@1064		SHG × 8.9 KDP	
4, 5-dichocyanimidazole hydrate	C_{5}N_{4}H_{2}·H_{2}O	0.618@546 nm			
strontium thiocyanurate undecahydrate	Sr(H_{2}C_{3}N_{3}S_{3})_{2}·11H_{2}O	0.627@546 nm			
4-dimethylaminopyridinium 4,5-dicyanoimidazolide monohydrate	[(C_{7}N_{2}H_{11})^{+}(C_{5}N_{4}H)^{−}]·H_{2}O	0.629@546 nm	3.79		
2,5,8-triamino-s-heptazine 2,4-guanidino-6-amino-1,3,5-triazine lead nonaiodide	(C_{6}N_{10}H_{6})_{2}(C_{5}N_{10}H_{10})_{2}PbI_{9}	0.64@546 nm	3.38	trigonal; UV edge 367 nm	
	Ba_{2}HgTe_{5}	0.643@2090 nm	1.28		
4-aminopyridinium dichlorohypoiodite	[H-4AP][ICl_{2}]	0.647@546 nm			
mercury hexathiodiphosphate	Hg_{2}P_{2}S_{6}	0.65@546 nm, 0.50 @ 1064 nm, 0.48 @2050 nm			
phenazine lead trichloride		0.65@546 nm			
	Ba_{6}Sb_{6}O_{2}S_{13}	0.66 at 2050 nm		black; thermal conductivity of 0.25 W m^{−1} K^{−1} at 700 K	
	Sn_{2}PO_{4}I	0.664@546 nm			
2-amino-5-chloropyridinium dichloroiodate(V)	(C_{5}H_{6}N_{2}Cl)(IO_{2}Cl_{2})	0.67@546	3.38		
5-Iodocytosine:protonated 5-Iodocytosine:dichorohypoiodate	(C_{4}H_{4.5}N_{3}OI)(ICl_{2})_{0.5}	0.675@546 nm			
	Na_{2}BP_{2}	0.68			
3,5-diiodopyridine-4-carboxylic acid with iodine	3,5-I_{2}Py-COOI	0.69			
Barium thiocyanurate 4.5 hydrate	Ba(H_{2}C_{3}N_{3}S_{3})_{2}·4.5H_{2}O	0.692@546 nm			
hexagonal boron nitride	h-BN	0.7			
	BaTiSe_{3}	0.7			
zinc dichloride:1,10-phenanthroline	(C_{12}H_{8}N_{2})ZnCl_{2}	0.70@546 nm		UV edge 368 nm; stable up to 431 °C	
protonated 5-Iodocytosine triichorodiiodate dihydrate	(C_{4}H_{5}N_{3}OI)I_{2}Cl_{3}·2H_{2}O	0.712@546 nm			
	CsICl_{2}	0.719 @1064 nm		UV edge 367 nm	
protonated 5-Iodocytosine dichorohypoiodatee hydrate	(C_{4}H_{5}N_{3}OI)ICl_{2}·H_{2}O	0.746@546 nm			
	BaTiS_{3}	0.76			
2,7-bis(2-phosphonomethyl)-1,3,6,8-tetraoxo-2,7-diazapyrene : water (HOFBC-1)		0.763@546 nm			
iodine nicotinate	I^{+}(C_{6}H_{4}NO_{2})^{−}	0.778@550 nm			
bis[dimethylammonium] dibromohypoiodite bromide	[HDMA]_{2}[IBr_{2}]·Br	0.782@546 nm			
Ortho phenanthroline antimony trifluoride	(C_{12}H_{8}N_{2})SbF_{3}	0.79@546 nm		density 2.065	
bis(isoquinolinium-3-carboxylic acid) hexafluorosilicate dihydrate	[C_{10}H_{8}NO_{2}]_{2}SiF_{6}·2H_{2}O	0.79@550 nm		UV edge 354 nm	
bis(protonated 1,10‒phenanthroline) tetrachlorozincate:ethylene glycol	(C_{12}H_{8}N_{2}H)_{2}ZnCl_{4}·C_{2}H_{6}O_{2}	0.80@546 nm			
[(1,3,6,8-tetraoxo-1,3,6,8-tetrahydrobenzo[lmn][3,8]phenanthroline-2,7-diyl)bis(methylene)]bis(phosphonic acid)		0.800@546 nm			
disodium bis-(4-hydroxypyridinium) 1,3,6,8-pyreneterasulfonate monohydrate	Na_{2}(4-HPyH)_{2}(PTS)·H_{2}O	0.811@546			
	(C_{5}H_{7}N_{2})I·I_{3}	0.829@1064 nm			
4-aminopyridinium dibromohypoiodite	[H-4AP][IBr_{2}]	0.836@546 nm			
1,3-diazapyrene:1,2,4,5-tetracyanobenzene		0.836@546 nm	2.68	blue edge 463 nm	
diprotonated 1,10‒phenanthroline tetrachlorozincate	(C_{12}H_{8}N_{2}H_{2})ZnCl_{4}	0.84@546 nm			
dipotassium (NCN)_{3}-heptazine	K_{2}HC_{9}N_{13}·3H_{2}O	0.87 @ 550 nm	3.52		
bis(quinoline-2-carboxylate)antimony fluoride	(C_{10}H_{6}NO_{2})_{2}SbF	0.87 @ 546 nm			
3,5-diiodopyridine:iodine monochloride	3,5-I_{2}Py-ICl	0.87@546			
	K_{2}HC_{9}N_{13}·3H_{2}O	0.87	3.52		
	Hg_{18}Ga_{8}Se_{8}Cl_{32}	0.871@546		transparent 400-25000; space group C2/c	
	(C_{5}H_{6}NO)_{2}I_{4}	0.891@1064 nm			
disodium croconate trihydrate	Na_{2}C_{5}O_{5}·3H_{2}O	0.893@546 nm	2.55	yellow	
vanadium dioxide	VO_{2}	>0.9		in thin film	
4-aminopyrdinium tetrachloriodite	C_{5}H_{7}N_{2}ICl_{4}	0.94@546	2.29	yellow; UV edge 360 nm	
	BaSbBS_{4}	0.952@546 nm	2.7 eV		
3,5-dichloropyridine:iodine monochloride	3,5-Cl_{2}Py-ICl	0.97@546			
diprotonated 2,2′-biquinoline cadmium tetracloride	C_{18}H_{14}N_{2}CdCl_{4}	1.017@546 nm			
	Li_{3}(C_{9}N_{13})·6H_{2}O	1.031	3.62	UV edge 325 nm	
disodium croconate dihydrate	Na_{2}C_{5}O_{5}·2H_{2}O	1.062@546 nm	2.67	yellow	
1,3-diazapyrene:water		1.169@546	2.93	blue edge 423 nm	
2,7-diazapyrene		1.223@546	2.94	blue edge 422 nm	
1,3-diazapyrene		1.269@546	2.97	blue edge 418 nm	
sodium rhodizonate	Na_{2}C_{6}O_{6}	1.35@2500	1.6	brown	
	C_{4}H_{6}N_{3}I_{2}	1.384@1064 nm			
molybdenum ditelluride	MoTe_{2}	1.54 mid IR			
tungsten disulfide	WS_{2}	1.95		refractive indexes 4.96, 3.01	
	Sr_{9/8}TiS_{3}	2.1 in mid IR		n_{e} = 4.5 n_{o} = 2.4	
Molybdenum oxydichloride	MoOCl_{2}	2.2			
melamine di(triiodide)	C_{3}H_{8}N_{6}I_{6}·3H_{2}O	2.8 @650 nm		pink-black; birefringence changes rapidly through visible spectrum	

== Extra reading ==
- Shen, Yaoguo; Xiong, Jiajia; Wu, Mengqing; Li, Mengcai; Zhou, Yingwu; Zhang, Yanjie (January 2026). "Enhancing Birefringence via a Planar-Conformation-Locking Strategy". Laser & Photonics Reviews. 20 (2) e01545. Bibcode:2026LPRv...2001545S. doi:10.1002/lpor.202501545. 2,2′-biquinoline dihydrochloride, dihydrobromide, or tetrahydroborate predicted 0.89, 0.85 and 0.82 @ 550 nm.
- Nguyen, Vivian; Chu, Chu; Sutherlin, Monique; Zhang, Bingbing; Wang, Jian (2026-01-21). "Synthesis, Crystal Growth, Linear, and Nonlinear Optical Properties of Water-Grown Giant Optical Anisotropic Thiocyanates ABi(SCN) 4 (A = Rb, Cs)". Crystal Growth & Design. 26 (2): 995–1002. Bibcode:2026CrGrD..26..995N. doi:10.1021/acs.cgd.5c01614. ISSN 1528-7483. predicted RbBi(SCN)_{4} birefringence 0.48@1064 and CsBi(SCN)_{4} 0.66@546 nm
- Arif, Muhammad; Liu, Xu; Jia, Hangwei; Yang, Zhihua; Hou, Xueling; Pan, Shilie (2025). "Optimizing optical anisotropy in low-dimensional structures via intralayer hydrogen bonding modulation and anionic substitution". Materials Horizons. 12 (10): 3538–3545. doi:10.1039/D4MH01790K. PMID 40007248. aminopyrazine sulfate derivatives
- Wu, Zhen-Cheng; Guo, Sheng-Ping (November 2025). "Research progress and future prospect of chalcogenides with large optical anisotropy". Coordination Chemistry Reviews. 542 216866. doi:10.1016/j.ccr.2025.216866. (review)
- Xu, A-Lan; Ran, Mao-Yin; Wu, Xin-Tao; Lin, Hua; Zhu, Qi-Long (October 2025). "Recent progress in structural design strategies of high-birefringence optical crystals". Coordination Chemistry Reviews. 540 216775. doi:10.1016/j.ccr.2025.216775. (review)
