= Pierre-Simon Laplace =

French polymath (1749–1827)

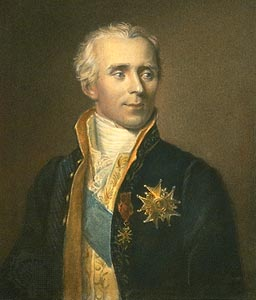
- Pierre-Simon Laplace as chancellor of the Senate under the First French Empire
- Born: 23 March 1749; Beaumont-en-Auge, Normandy, Kingdom of France
- Died: 5 March 1827 (aged 77); Paris, Kingdom of France
- Education: University of Caen
- Known for: Work in celestial mechanics Predicting the existence of black holes Bayesian inference Bayesian probability Laplace's equation Laplacian Laplace transform Inverse Laplace transform Laplace distribution Laplace's demon Young–Laplace equation Laplace number Laplace limit Laplace invariant Laplace principle Laplace's principle of insufficient reason Laplace's method Laplace force Laplace filter Laplace functional Laplacian matrix Laplace motion Laplace plane Laplace pressure Laplace resonance Laplace's spherical harmonics Laplace smoothing Laplace expansion Laplace expansion Laplace-Bayes estimator Laplace–Stieltjes transform Laplace–Runge–Lenz vector Nebular hypothesis
- Scientific career
- Fields: Astronomy and mathematics
- Workplaces: École Militaire (1769–1776)
- Academic advisors: Jean d'Alembert; Christophe Gadbled; Pierre Le Canu
- Notable students: Siméon Denis Poisson; Napoleon Bonaparte

Minister of the Interior
- In office 12 November 1799 – 25 December 1799
- Prime Minister: Napoleon Bonaparte (as First Consul)
- Preceded by: Nicolas Marie Quinette
- Succeeded by: Lucien Bonaparte

Pierre-Simon, Marquis de Laplace (/ləˈplɑːs/; French: [pjɛʁ simɔ̃ laplas]; 23 March 1749 – 5 March 1827) was a French polymath, a scholar whose work has been instrumental in the fields of physics, astronomy, mathematics, engineering, statistics, and philosophy. He summarized and extended the work of his predecessors in his five-volume Mécanique céleste (Celestial Mechanics) (1799–1825). This work translated the geometric study of classical mechanics to one based on calculus, opening up a broader range of problems. Laplace also popularized and further confirmed Sir Isaac Newton's work. In statistics, the Bayesian interpretation of probability was developed mainly by Laplace.

Laplace formulated Laplace's equation, and pioneered the Laplace transform which appears in many branches of mathematical physics, a field that he took a leading role in forming. The Laplacian differential operator, widely used in mathematics, is also named after him. He restated and developed the nebular hypothesis of the origin of the Solar System and was one of the first scientists to suggest an idea similar to that of a black hole, with Stephen Hawking stating that "Laplace essentially predicted the existence of black holes". He originated Laplace's demon, which is a hypothetical all-predicting intellect. He also refined Newton's calculation of the speed of sound to derive a more accurate measurement.

Laplace is regarded as one of the greatest scientists of all time. Sometimes referred to as the French Newton or Newton of France, he has been described as possessing a phenomenal natural mathematical faculty superior to that of almost all of his contemporaries. He was Napoleon's examiner when Napoleon graduated from the École Militaire in Paris in 1785. Laplace became a Count of the Empire in 1806 and was named a marquis in 1817, after the Bourbon Restoration.

== Early years ==
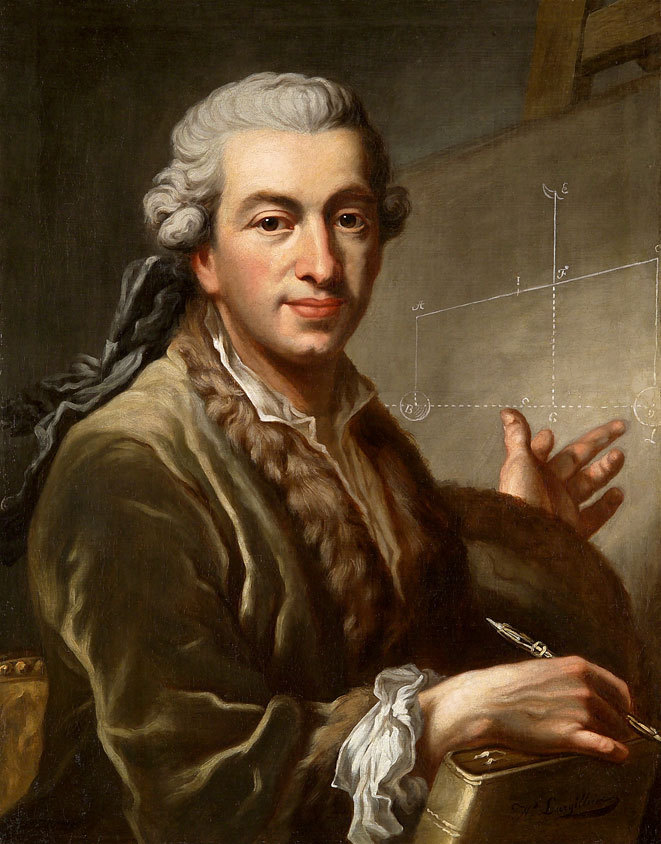
Portrait of Pierre-Simon Laplace by Johann Ernst Heinsius (1784)

Some details of Laplace's life are not known, as records of it were burned in 1925 with the family château in Saint Julien de Mailloc, near Lisieux, the home of his great-great-grandson the Comte de Colbert-Laplace. Others had been destroyed earlier, when his house at Arcueil near Paris was looted in 1871.

Laplace was born in Beaumont-en-Auge, Normandy on 23 March 1749, a village four miles west of Pont l'Évêque. According to W. W. Rouse Ball, Laplace was the son of a poor farmer or farm-labourer. It would seem that from a pupil he became an usher in the school at Beaumont; but, having procured a letter of introduction to d'Alembert, he went to Paris to advance his fortune. However, later historical research established that his father, Pierre de Laplace, actually owned and farmed the small estate of Mérisier, and his great-uncle, Maître Olivier de Laplace, had held the title of Chirurgien Royal. Karl Pearson is scathing about the inaccuracies in Rouse Ball's account and states:

Indeed Caen was probably in Laplace's day the most intellectually active of all the towns of Normandy. It was here that Laplace was educated and was provisionally a professor. It was here he wrote his first paper published in the Mélanges of the Royal Society of Turin, Tome iv. 1766–1769, at least two years before he went at 22 or 23 to Paris in 1771. Thus before he was 20 he was in touch with Lagrange in Turin. He did not go to Paris a raw self-taught country lad with only a peasant background! In 1765 at the age of sixteen Laplace left the "School of the Duke of Orleans" in Beaumont and went to the University of Caen, where he appears to have studied for five years and was a member of the Sphinx. The École Militaire of Beaumont did not replace the old school until 1776.

His parents, Pierre Laplace and Marie-Anne Sochon, were from comfortable families. The Laplace family was involved in agriculture until at least 1750, but Pierre Laplace senior was also a cider merchant and syndic of the town of Beaumont.

Pierre Simon Laplace attended a school in the village run at a Benedictine priory, his father intending that he be ordained in the Roman Catholic Church. At sixteen, to further his father's intention, he was sent to the University of Caen to read theology.

At the university, he was mentored by two enthusiastic teachers of mathematics, Christophe Gadbled and Pierre Le Canu, who awoke his zeal for the subject. Here Laplace's brilliance as a mathematician was quickly recognised and while still at Caen he wrote a memoir Sur le Calcul integral aux differences infiniment petites et aux differences finies. This provided the first correspondence between Laplace and Lagrange. Lagrange was the senior by thirteen years, and had recently founded in his native city Turin a journal named Miscellanea Taurinensia, in which many of his early works were printed and it was in the fourth volume of this series that Laplace's paper appeared. About this time, recognising that he had no vocation for the priesthood, he resolved to become a professional mathematician. Some sources state that he then broke with the church and became an atheist. Laplace did not graduate in theology but left for Paris with a letter of introduction from Le Canu to Jean le Rond d'Alembert who at that time was supreme in scientific circles.

According to his great-great-grandson, d'Alembert received him rather poorly, and to get rid of him gave him a thick mathematics book, saying to come back when he had read it. When Laplace came back a few days later, d'Alembert was even less friendly and did not hide his opinion that it was impossible that Laplace could have read and understood the book. But upon questioning him, he realised that it was true, and from that time he took Laplace under his care.

Another account is that Laplace solved overnight a problem that d'Alembert set him for submission the following week, then solved a harder problem the following night. D'Alembert was impressed and recommended him for a teaching place in the École Militaire.

With a secure income and undemanding teaching, Laplace now threw himself into original research and for the next seventeen years, 1771–1787, he produced much of his original work in astronomy.

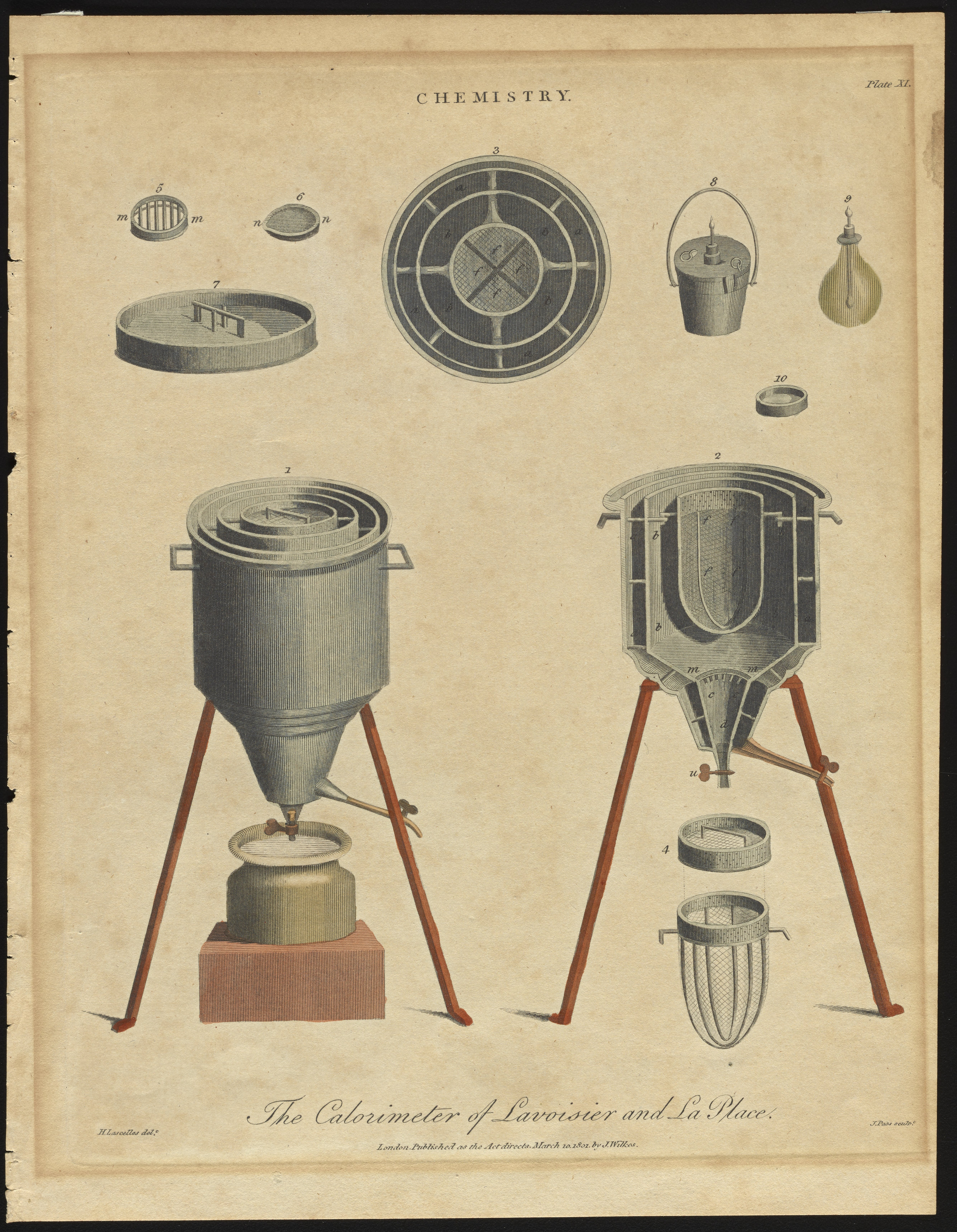
The Calorimeter of Lavoisier and La Place, Encyclopaedia Londinensis, 1801

From 1780 to 1784, Laplace and French chemist Antoine Lavoisier collaborated on several experimental investigations, designing their own equipment for the task. In 1783 they published their joint paper, Memoir on Heat, in which they discussed the kinetic theory of molecular motion. In their experiments they measured the specific heat of various bodies, and the expansion of metals with increasing temperature. They also measured the boiling points of ethanol and ether under pressure.

Laplace further impressed the Marquis de Condorcet, and already by 1771 Laplace felt entitled to membership in the French Academy of Sciences. However, that year admission went to Alexandre-Théophile Vandermonde and in 1772 to Jacques Antoine Joseph Cousin. Laplace was disgruntled, and early in 1773 d'Alembert wrote to Lagrange in Berlin to ask if a position could be found for Laplace there. However, Condorcet became permanent secretary of the Académie in February and Laplace was elected associate member on 31 March, at age 24. In 1773 Laplace read his paper on the invariability of planetary motion in front of the Academy des Sciences. That March he was elected to the academy, a place where he conducted the majority of his science.

On 15 March 1788, at the age of thirty-nine, Laplace married Marie-Charlotte de Courty de Romanges, an eighteen-year-old girl from a "good" family in Besançon. The wedding was celebrated at Saint-Sulpice, Paris. The couple had a son, Charles-Émile (1789–1874), and a daughter, Sophie-Suzanne (1792–1813).

== Analysis, probability, and astronomical stability ==
Laplace's early published work in 1771 started with differential equations and finite differences but he was already starting to think about the mathematical and philosophical concepts of probability and statistics. However, before his election to the Académie in 1773, he had already drafted two papers that would establish his reputation. The first, Mémoire sur la probabilité des causes par les événements was ultimately published in 1774 while the second paper, published in 1776, further elaborated his statistical thinking and also began his systematic work on celestial mechanics and the stability of the Solar System. The two disciplines would always be interlinked in his mind. "Laplace took probability as an instrument for repairing defects in knowledge." Laplace's work on probability and statistics is discussed below with his mature work on the analytic theory of probabilities.

=== Stability of the Solar System ===
Sir Isaac Newton had published his Philosophiæ Naturalis Principia Mathematica in 1687 in which he gave a derivation of Kepler's laws, which describe the motion of the planets, from his laws of motion and his law of universal gravitation. However, though Newton had privately developed the methods of calculus, all his published work used cumbersome geometric reasoning, unsuitable to account for the more subtle higher-order effects of interactions between the planets. Newton himself had doubted the possibility of a mathematical solution to the whole, even concluding that periodic divine intervention was necessary to guarantee the stability of the Solar System. Dispensing with the hypothesis of divine intervention would be a major activity of Laplace's scientific life. It is now generally regarded that Laplace's methods on their own, though vital to the development of the theory, are not sufficiently precise to demonstrate the stability of the Solar System; today the Solar System is understood to be generally chaotic at fine scales, although currently fairly stable on coarse scale.

One particular problem from observational astronomy was the apparent instability whereby Jupiter's orbit appeared to be shrinking while that of Saturn was expanding. The problem had been tackled by Leonhard Euler in 1748, and Joseph Louis Lagrange in 1763, but without success. In 1776, Laplace published a memoir in which he first explored the possible influences of a purported luminiferous ether or of a law of gravitation that did not act instantaneously. He ultimately returned to an intellectual investment in Newtonian gravity. Euler and Lagrange had made a practical approximation by ignoring small terms in the equations of motion. Laplace noted that though the terms themselves were small, when integrated over time they could become important. Laplace carried his analysis into the higher-order terms, up to and including the cubic. Using this more exact analysis, Laplace concluded that any two planets and the Sun must be in mutual equilibrium and thereby launched his work on the stability of the Solar System. Gerald James Whitrow described the achievement as "the most important advance in physical astronomy since Newton".

Laplace had a wide knowledge of all sciences and dominated all discussions in the Académie. Laplace seems to have regarded analysis merely as a means of attacking physical problems, though the ability with which he invented the necessary analysis is almost phenomenal. As long as his results were true he took but little trouble to explain the steps by which he arrived at them; he never studied elegance or symmetry in his processes, and it was sufficient for him if he could by any means solve the particular question he was discussing.

== Tidal dynamics ==
=== Dynamic theory of tides ===
While Newton explained the tides by describing the tide-generating forces and Bernoulli gave a description of the static reaction of the waters on Earth to the tidal potential, the dynamic theory of tides, developed by Laplace in 1775, describes the ocean's real reaction to tidal forces. Laplace's theory of ocean tides took into account friction, resonance and natural periods of ocean basins. It predicted the large amphidromic systems in the world's ocean basins and explains the oceanic tides that are actually observed.

The equilibrium theory, based on the gravitational gradient from the Sun and Moon but ignoring the Earth's rotation, the effects of continents, and other important effects, could not explain the real ocean tides.

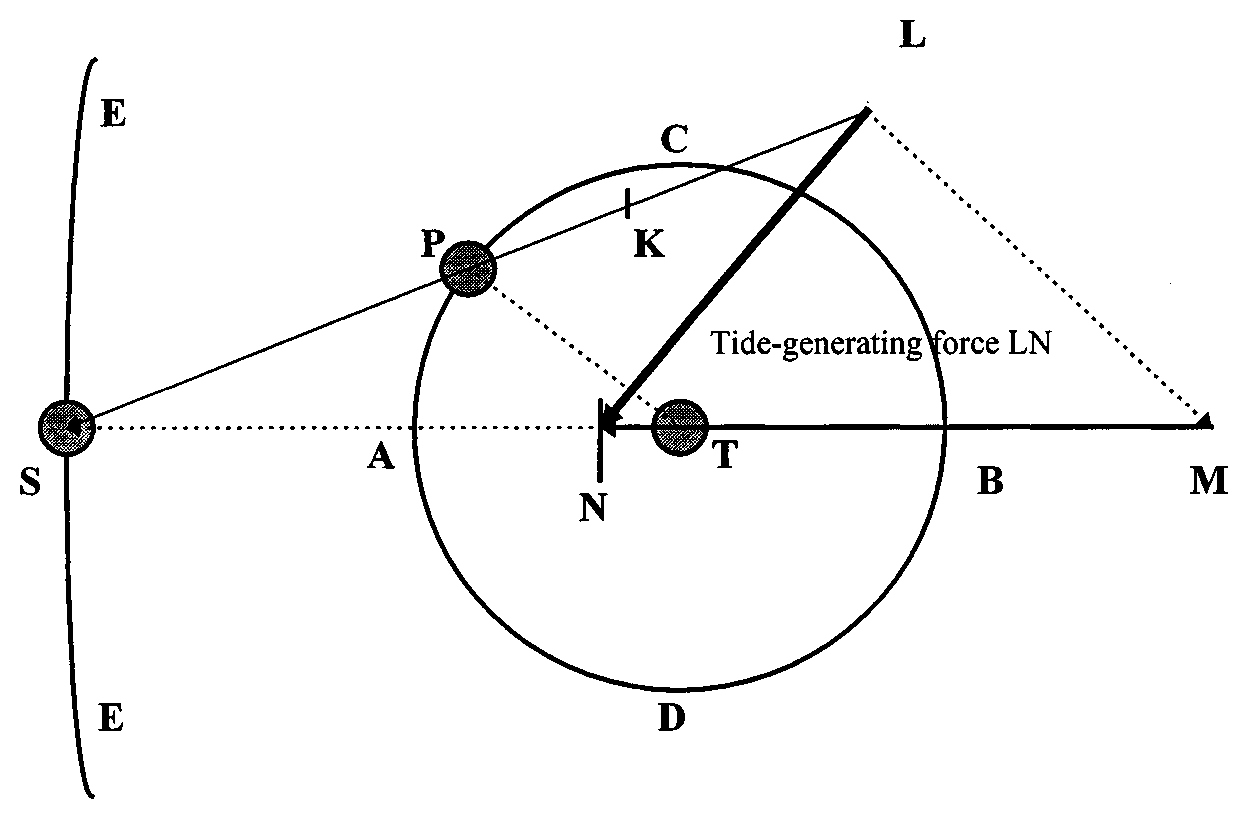
Newton's three-body model

Since measurements have confirmed the theory, many things have possible explanations now, like how the tides interact with deep sea ridges and chains of seamounts give rise to deep eddies that transport nutrients from the deep to the surface. The equilibrium tide theory calculates the height of the tide wave of less than half a meter, while the dynamic theory explains why tides are up to 15 meters. Satellite observations confirm the accuracy of the dynamic theory, and the tides worldwide are now measured to within a few centimeters. Measurements from the CHAMP satellite closely match the models based on the TOPEX data. Accurate models of tides worldwide are essential for research since the variations due to tides must be removed from measurements when calculating gravity and changes in sea levels.

=== Laplace's tidal equations ===
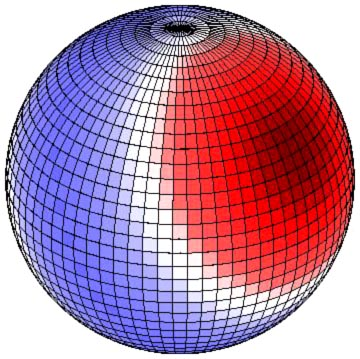
A. Lunar gravitational potential: this depicts the Moon directly over 30° N (or 30° S) viewed from above the Northern Hemisphere.

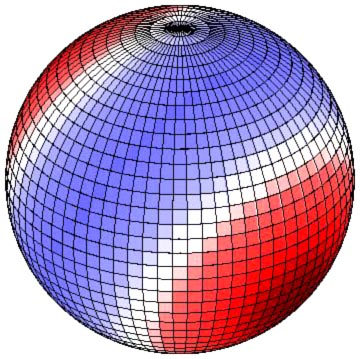
B. This view shows same potential from 180° from view A. Viewed from above the Northern Hemisphere. Red up, blue down.

In 1776, Laplace formulated a single set of linear partial differential equations, for tidal flow described as a barotropic two-dimensional sheet flow. Coriolis effects are introduced as well as lateral forcing by gravity. Laplace obtained these equations by simplifying the fluid dynamic equations. But they can also be derived from energy integrals via Lagrange's equation.

For a fluid sheet of average thickness D, the vertical tidal elevation ζ, as well as the horizontal velocity components u and v (in the latitude φ and longitude λ directions, respectively) satisfy Laplace's tidal equations:

$$\begin{align}
\frac{\partial \zeta}{\partial t}
&+ \frac{1}{a \cos( \varphi )} \left[
\frac{\partial}{\partial \lambda} (uD)
+ \frac{\partial}{\partial \varphi} \left(vD \cos( \varphi )\right)
\right]
= 0,
\\[2ex]
\frac{\partial u}{\partial t}
&- v \left( 2 \Omega \sin( \varphi ) \right)
+ \frac{1}{a \cos( \varphi )} \frac{\partial}{\partial \lambda} \left( g \zeta + U \right)
=0
\qquad \text{and} \\[2ex]
\frac{\partial v}{\partial t}
&+ u \left( 2 \Omega \sin( \varphi ) \right)
+ \frac{1}{a} \frac{\partial}{\partial \varphi} \left( g \zeta + U \right)
=0,
\end{align}$$

where Ω is the angular frequency of the planet's rotation, g is the planet's gravitational acceleration at the mean ocean surface, a is the planetary radius, and U is the external gravitational tidal-forcing potential.

William Thomson (Lord Kelvin) rewrote Laplace's momentum terms using the curl to find an equation for vorticity. Under certain conditions this can be further rewritten as a conservation of vorticity.

== On the figure of the Earth ==
During the years 1784–1787 he published some papers of exceptional power. Prominent among these is one read in 1783, reprinted as Part II of Théorie du Mouvement et de la figure elliptique des planètes in 1784, and in the third volume of the Mécanique céleste. In this work, Laplace completely determined the attraction of a spheroid on a particle outside it. This is memorable for the introduction into analysis of spherical harmonics or Laplace's coefficients, and also for the development of the use of what we would now call the gravitational potential in celestial mechanics.

=== Spherical harmonics ===
Spherical harmonics

In 1783, in a paper sent to the Académie, Adrien-Marie Legendre had introduced what are now known as associated Legendre functions. If two points in a plane have polar coordinates (r, θ) and (r ', θ'), where r ' ≥ r, then, by elementary manipulation, the reciprocal of the distance between the points, d, can be written as:

$$\frac{1}{d} = \frac{1}{r'} \left [ 1 - 2 \cos (\theta' - \theta) \frac{r}{r'} + \left ( \frac{r}{r'} \right ) ^2 \right ] ^{- \tfrac{1}{2}}.$$

This expression can be expanded in powers of r/r ' using Newton's generalised binomial theorem to give:

$$\frac{1}{d} = \frac{1}{r'} \sum_{k=0}^\infty P^0_k ( \cos ( \theta' - \theta ) ) \left ( \frac{r}{r'} \right ) ^k.$$

The sequence of functions P^{0}_{k}(cos φ) is the set of so-called "associated Legendre functions" and their usefulness arises from the fact that every function of the points on a circle can be expanded as a series of them.

Laplace, with scant regard for credit to Legendre, made the non-trivial extension of the result to three dimensions to yield a more general set of functions, the spherical harmonics or Laplace coefficients. The latter term is not in common use now.

=== Potential theory ===
This paper is also remarkable for the development of the idea of the scalar potential. The gravitational force acting on a body is, in modern language, a vector, having magnitude and direction. A potential function is a scalar function that defines how the vectors will behave. A scalar function is computationally and conceptually easier to deal with than a vector function.

Alexis Clairaut had first suggested the idea in 1743 while working on a similar problem though he was using Newtonian-type geometric reasoning. Laplace described Clairaut's work as being "in the class of the most beautiful mathematical productions". However, Rouse Ball alleges that the idea "was appropriated from Joseph Louis Lagrange, who had used it in his memoirs of 1773, 1777 and 1780". The term "potential" itself was due to Daniel Bernoulli, who introduced it in his 1738 memoire Hydrodynamica. However, according to Rouse Ball, the term "potential function" was not actually used (to refer to a function V of the coordinates of space in Laplace's sense) until George Green's 1828 An Essay on the Application of Mathematical Analysis to the Theories of Electricity and Magnetism.

Laplace applied the language of calculus to the potential function and showed that it always satisfies the differential equation:

$$\nabla^2V={\partial^2V\over \partial x^2 } +
{\partial^2V\over \partial y^2 } +
{\partial^2V\over \partial z^2 } = 0.$$

An analogous result for the velocity potential of a fluid had been obtained some years previously by Leonhard Euler.

Laplace's subsequent work on gravitational attraction was based on this result. The quantity ∇^{2}V has been termed the concentration of V and its value at any point indicates the "excess" of the value of V there over its mean value in the neighbourhood of the point. Laplace's equation, a special case of Poisson's equation, appears ubiquitously in mathematical physics. The concept of a potential occurs in fluid dynamics, electromagnetism and other areas. Rouse Ball speculated that it might be seen as "the outward sign" of one of the a priori forms in Kant's theory of perception.

The spherical harmonics turn out to be critical to practical solutions of Laplace's equation. Laplace's equation in spherical coordinates, such as are used for mapping the sky, can be simplified, using the method of separation of variables into a radial part, depending solely on distance from the centre point, and an angular or spherical part. The solution to the spherical part of the equation can be expressed as a series of Laplace's spherical harmonics, simplifying practical computation.

== Planetary and lunar inequalities ==
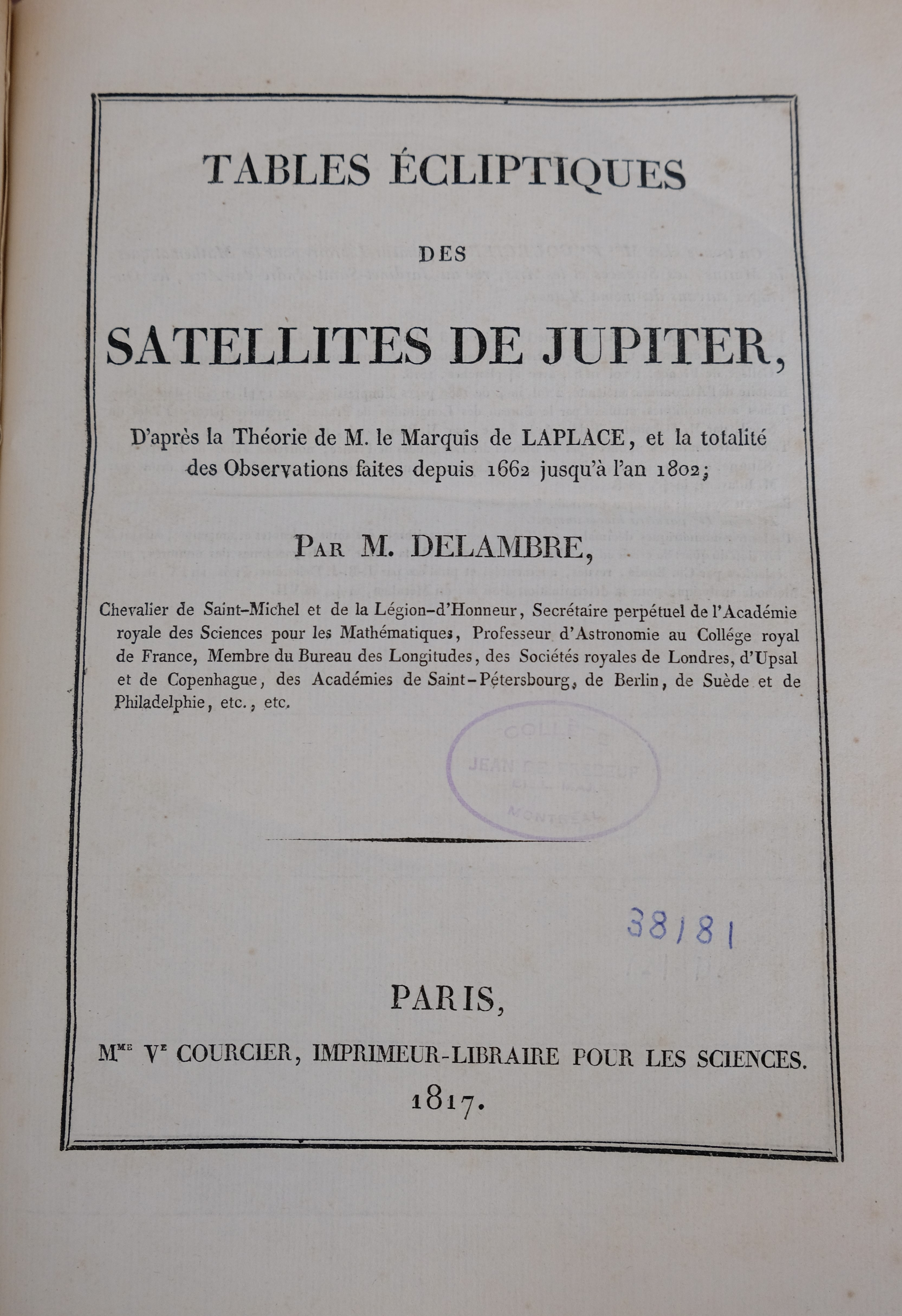
Title page of an 1817 copy of Delambre's "Tables écliptiques des satellites de Jupiter", which references Laplace's contributions in its title

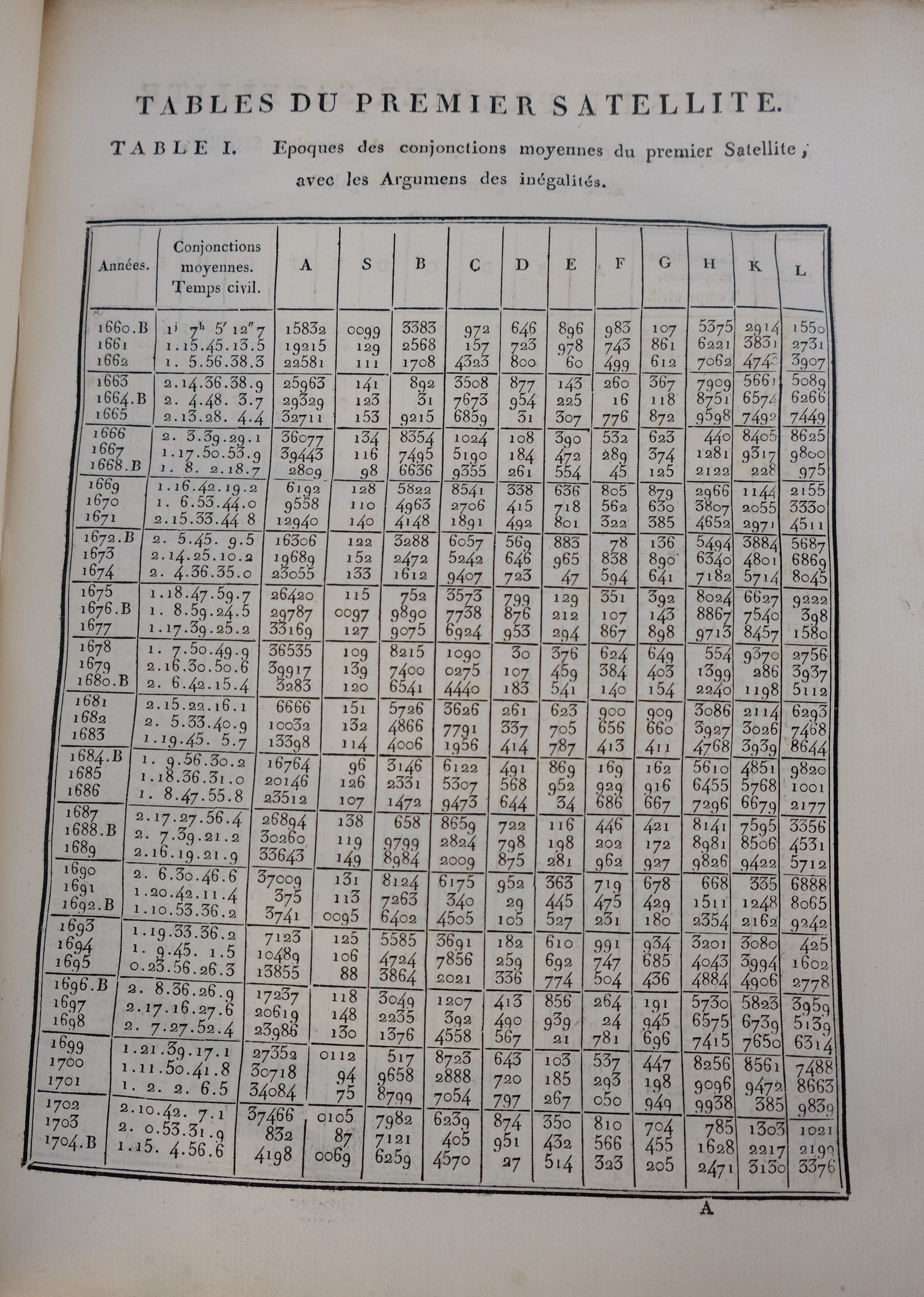
Tables in an 1817 copy of Delambre's "Tables écliptiques des satellites de Jupiter" – these calculations were influenced by Laplace's previous discoveries.

=== Jupiter–Saturn great inequality ===
Laplace presented a memoir on planetary inequalities in three sections, in 1784, 1785, and 1786. This dealt mainly with the identification and explanation of the perturbations now known as the "great Jupiter–Saturn inequality". Laplace solved a longstanding problem in the study and prediction of the movements of these planets. He showed by general considerations, first, that the mutual action of two planets could never cause large changes in the eccentricities and inclinations of their orbits; but then, even more importantly, that peculiarities arose in the Jupiter–Saturn system because of the near approach to commensurability of the mean motions of Jupiter and Saturn.

In this context commensurability means that the ratio of the two planets' mean motions is very nearly equal to a ratio between a pair of small whole numbers. Two periods of Saturn's orbit around the Sun almost equal five of Jupiter's. The corresponding difference between multiples of the mean motions, (2n_{J} − 5n_{S}), corresponds to a period of nearly 900 years, and it occurs as a small divisor in the integration of a very small perturbing force with this same period. As a result, the integrated perturbations with this period are disproportionately large, about 0.8° degrees of arc in orbital longitude for Saturn and about 0.3° for Jupiter.

Further developments of these theorems on planetary motion were given in his two memoirs of 1788 and 1789, but with the aid of Laplace's discoveries, the tables of the motions of Jupiter and Saturn could at last be made much more accurate. It was on the basis of Laplace's theory that Delambre computed his astronomical tables.

=== Books ===
Laplace now set himself the task to write a work which should "offer a complete solution of the great mechanical problem presented by the Solar System, and bring theory to coincide so closely with observation that empirical equations should no longer find a place in astronomical tables." The result is embodied in the Exposition du système du monde and the Mécanique céleste.

The former was published in 1796, and gives a general explanation of the phenomena, but omits all details. It contains a summary of the history of astronomy. This summary procured for its author the honour of admission to the forty of the French Academy and is commonly esteemed one of the masterpieces of French literature, though it is not altogether reliable for the later periods of which it treats.

Laplace developed the nebular hypothesis of the formation of the Solar System, first suggested by Emanuel Swedenborg and expanded by Immanuel Kant. This hypothesis remains the most widely accepted model in the study of the origin of planetary systems. According to Laplace's description of the hypothesis, the Solar System evolved from a globular mass of incandescent gas rotating around an axis through its centre of mass. As it cooled, this mass contracted, and successive rings broke off from its outer edge. These rings in their turn cooled, and finally condensed into the planets, while the Sun represented the central core which was still left. On this view, Laplace predicted that the more distant planets would be older than those nearer the Sun.

As mentioned, the idea of the nebular hypothesis had been outlined by Immanuel Kant in 1755, who had also suggested "meteoric aggregations" and tidal friction as causes affecting the formation of the Solar System. Laplace was probably aware of this, but, like many writers of his time, he generally did not reference the work of others.

Laplace's analytical discussion of the Solar System is given in his Mécanique céleste published in five volumes. The first two volumes, published in 1799, contain methods for calculating the motions of the planets, determining their figures, and resolving tidal problems. The third and fourth volumes, published in 1802 and 1805, contain applications of these methods, and several astronomical tables. The fifth volume, published in 1825, is mainly historical, but it gives as appendices the results of Laplace's latest researches. The Mécanique céleste contains numerous of Laplace's own investigations but many results are appropriated from other writers with little or no acknowledgement. The volume's conclusions, which are described by historians as the organised result of a century of work by other writers as well as Laplace, are presented by Laplace as if they were his discoveries alone.

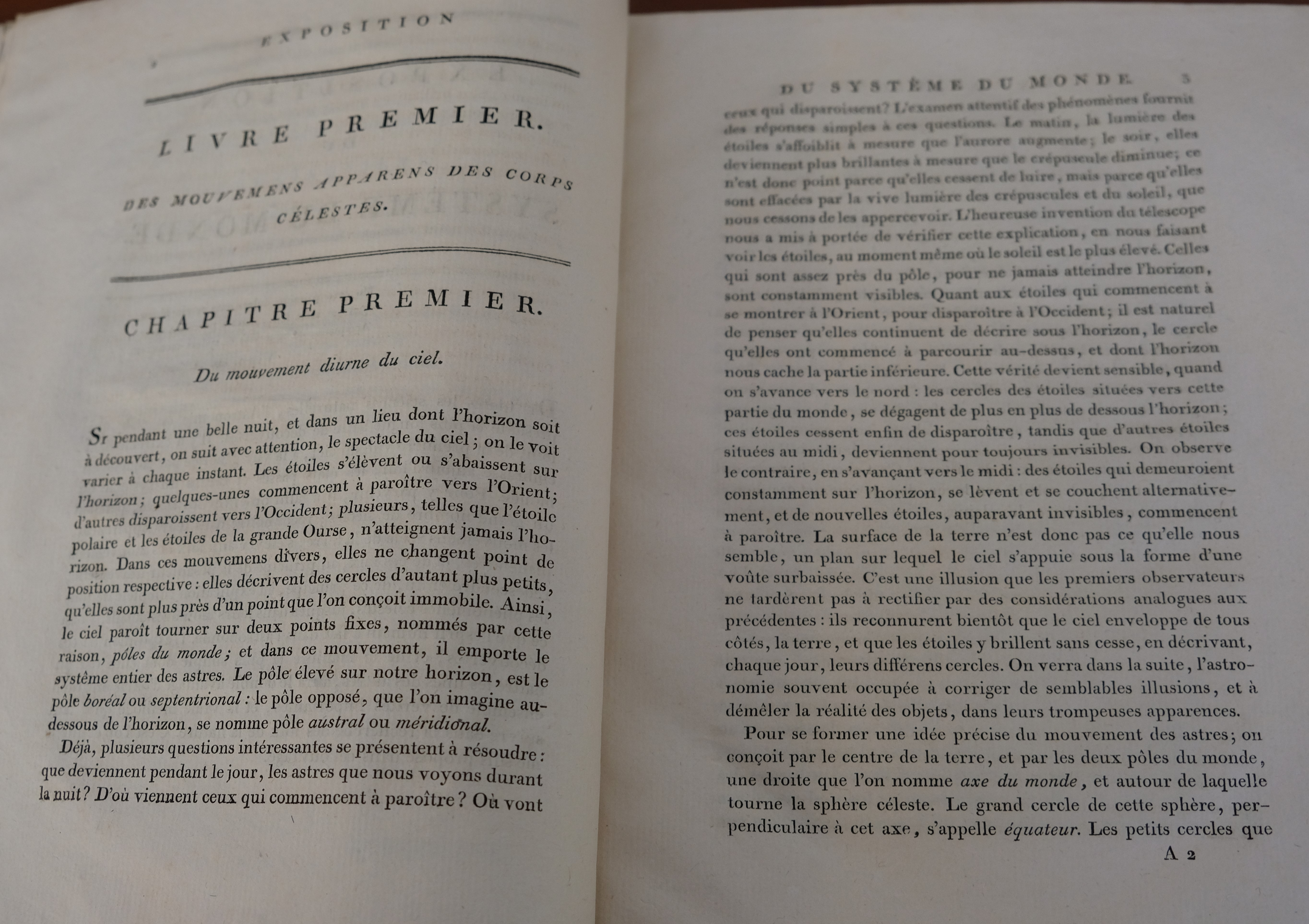
First pages to Exposition du Système du Monde (1799)

Jean-Baptiste Biot, who assisted Laplace in revising it for the press, says that Laplace himself was frequently unable to recover the details in the chain of reasoning, and, if satisfied that the conclusions were correct, he was content to insert the phrase, "Il est aisé à voir que..." ("It is easy to see that..."). The Mécanique céleste is not only the translation of Newton's Principia Mathematica into the language of differential calculus, but it completes parts of which Newton had been unable to fill in the details. The work was carried forward in a more finely tuned form in Félix Tisserand's Traité de mécanique céleste (1889–1896), but Laplace's treatise remains a standard authority. In the years 1784–1787, Laplace produced some memoirs of exceptional power. The significant among these was one issued in 1784, and reprinted in the third volume of the Mécanique céleste. In this work he completely determined the attraction of a spheroid on a particle outside it. This is known for the introduction into analysis of the potential, a useful mathematical concept of broad applicability to the physical sciences.

== Optics ==
Laplace was a supporter of the corpuscle theory of light of Newton. In the fourth edition of Mécanique Céleste, Laplace assumed that short-ranged molecular forces were responsible for refraction of the corpuscles of light. Laplace and Étienne-Louis Malus also showed that Huygens principle of double refraction could be recovered from the principle of least action on light particles.

However in 1815, Augustin-Jean Fresnel presented a new wave theory for diffraction to a commission of the French Academy with the help of François Arago. Laplace was one of the commission members and they ultimately awarded a prize to Fresnel for his new approach.

=== Influence of gravity on light ===
Using corpuscular theory, Laplace also came close to propounding the concept of the black hole. He suggested that gravity could influence light and that there could be massive stars whose gravity is so great that not even light could escape from their surface (see escape velocity). However, this insight was so far ahead of its time that it played no role in the history of scientific development.

== Arcueil ==
Laplace's house at Arcueil to the south of Paris

In 1806, Laplace bought a house in Arcueil, then a village and not yet absorbed into the Paris conurbation. The chemist Claude Louis Berthollet was a neighbour – their gardens were not separated – and the pair formed the nucleus of an informal scientific circle, latterly known as the Society of Arcueil. Because of their closeness to Napoleon, Laplace and Berthollet effectively controlled advancement in the scientific establishment and admission to the more prestigious offices. The Society built up a complex pyramid of patronage. In 1806, Laplace was also elected a foreign member of the Royal Swedish Academy of Sciences.

== Analytic theory of probabilities ==
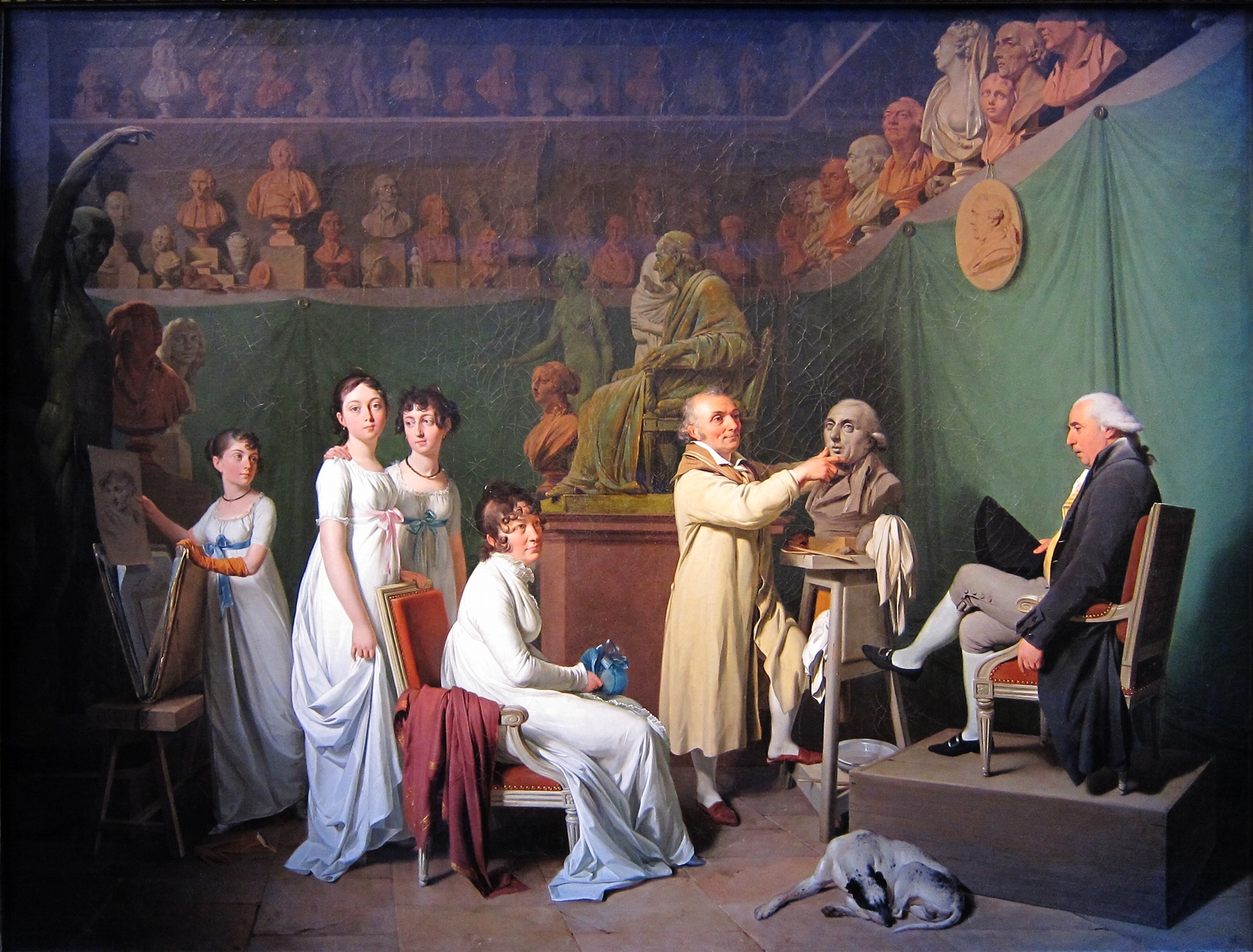
The Studio of Jean-Antoine Houdon by Louis-Léopold Boilly. The painting exhibited at the Salon of 1804 at the Louvre, shows Laplace sitting for a portrait bust in the studio of Jean-Antoine Houdon

In 1812, Laplace issued his Théorie analytique des probabilités in which he laid down many fundamental results in statistics. The first half of this treatise was concerned with probability methods and problems, the second half with statistical methods and applications. Laplace's proofs are not always rigorous according to the standards of a later day, and his perspective slides back and forth between the Bayesian and non-Bayesian views with an ease that makes some of his investigations difficult to follow, but his conclusions remain basically sound even in those few situations where his analysis goes astray. In 1819, he published a popular account of his work on probability. This book bears the same relation to the Théorie des probabilités that the Système du monde does to the Mécanique céleste. In its emphasis on the analytical importance of probabilistic problems, especially in the context of the "approximation of formula functions of large numbers," Laplace's work goes beyond the contemporary view which almost exclusively considered aspects of practical applicability. Laplace's Théorie analytique remained the most influential book of mathematical probability theory to the end of the 19th century. The general relevance for statistics of Laplacian error theory was appreciated only by the end of the 19th century. However, it influenced the further development of a largely analytically oriented probability theory.

=== Inductive probability ===
In his Essai philosophique sur les probabilités (1814), Laplace set out a mathematical system of inductive reasoning based on probability, which we would today recognise as Bayesian. He begins the text with a series of principles of probability, the first seven being:

1. Probability is the ratio of the "favored events" to the total possible events.
2. The first principle assumes equal probabilities for all events. When this is not true, we must first determine the probabilities of each event. Then, the probability is the sum of the probabilities of all possible favoured events.
3. For independent events, the probability of the occurrence of all is the probability of each multiplied together.
4. When two events A and B depend on each other, the probability of compound event is the probability of A multiplied by the probability that, given A, B will occur.
5. The probability that A will occur, given that B has occurred, is the probability of A and B occurring divided by the probability of B.
6. Three corollaries are given for the sixth principle, which amount to Bayesian rule. Where event A_{i} ∈ {A_{1}, A_{2}, ... A_{n}} exhausts the list of possible causes for event B, Pr(B) = Pr(A_{1}, A_{2}, ..., A_{n}). Then $\Pr(A_i \mid B) = \Pr(A_i)\frac{\Pr(B\mid A_i)}{\sum_j \Pr(A_j)\Pr(B\mid A_j)}.$
7. The probability of a future event C is the sum of the products of the probability of each causes B_{i} drawn from the event observed A, by the probability that, this cause existing, the future event will occur. Symbolically, $\Pr(C|A) = \sum_i \Pr(C|B_i) \Pr(B_i|A).$

One well-known formula arising from his system is the rule of succession, given as principle seven. Suppose that some trial has only two possible outcomes, labelled "success" and "failure". Under the assumption that little or nothing is known a priori about the relative plausibilities of the outcomes, Laplace derived a formula for the probability that the next trial will be a success.

$$\Pr(\text{next outcome is success}) = \frac{s+1}{n+2}$$

where s is the number of previously observed successes and n is the total number of observed trials. It is still used as an estimator for the probability of an event if we know the event space, but have only a small number of samples.

The rule of succession has been subject to much criticism, partly due to the example which Laplace chose to illustrate it. He calculated that the probability that the sun will rise tomorrow, given that it has never failed to in the past, was

$$\Pr(\text{sun will rise tomorrow}) = \frac{d+1}{d+2}$$

where d is the number of times the sun has risen in the past. This result has been derided as absurd, and some authors have concluded that all applications of the Rule of Succession are absurd by extension. However, Laplace was fully aware of the absurdity of the result; immediately following the example, he wrote, "But this number [i.e., the probability that the sun will rise tomorrow] is far greater for him who, seeing in the totality of phenomena the principle regulating the days and seasons, realizes that nothing at the present moment can arrest the course of it."

=== Probability-generating function ===
The method of estimating the ratio of the number of favourable cases to the whole number of possible cases had been previously indicated by Laplace in a paper written in 1779. It consists of treating the successive values of any function as the coefficients in the expansion of another function, with reference to a different variable. The latter is therefore called the probability-generating function of the former. Laplace then shows how, by means of interpolation, these coefficients may be determined from the generating function. Next he attacks the converse problem, and from the coefficients he finds the generating function; this is effected by the solution of a finite difference equation.

=== Least squares and central limit theorem ===
The fourth chapter of this treatise includes an exposition of the method of least squares, a remarkable testimony to Laplace's command over the processes of analysis. In 1805 Legendre had published the method of least squares, making no attempt to tie it to the theory of probability. In 1809 Gauss had derived the normal distribution from the principle that the arithmetic mean of observations gives the most probable value for the quantity measured; then, turning this argument back upon itself, he showed that, if the errors of observation are normally distributed, the least squares estimates give the most probable values for the coefficients in regression situations. These two works seem to have spurred Laplace to complete work toward a treatise on probability he had contemplated as early as 1783.

In two important papers in 1810 and 1811, Laplace first developed the characteristic function as a tool for large-sample theory and proved the first general central limit theorem. Then in a supplement to his 1810 paper written after he had seen Gauss's work, he showed that the central limit theorem provided a Bayesian justification for least squares: if one were combining observations, each one of which was itself the mean of a large number of independent observations, then the least squares estimates would not only maximise the likelihood function, considered as a posterior distribution, but also minimise the expected posterior error, all this without any assumption as to the error distribution or a circular appeal to the principle of the arithmetic mean. In 1811 Laplace took a different non-Bayesian tack. Considering a linear regression problem, he restricted his attention to linear unbiased estimators of the linear coefficients. After showing that members of this class were approximately normally distributed if the number of observations was large, he argued that least squares provided the "best" linear estimators. Here it is "best" in the sense that it minimised the asymptotic variance and thus both minimised the expected absolute value of the error, and maximised the probability that the estimate would lie in any symmetric interval about the unknown coefficient, no matter what the error distribution. His derivation included the joint limiting distribution of the least squares estimators of two parameters.

== Laplace's demon ==
In 1814, Laplace published what may have been the first scientific articulation of causal determinism:

We may regard the present state of the universe as the effect of its past and the cause of its future. An intellect which at a certain moment would know all forces that set nature in motion, and all positions of all items of which nature is composed, if this intellect were also vast enough to submit these data to analysis, it would embrace in a single formula the movements of the greatest bodies of the universe and those of the tiniest atom; for such an intellect nothing would be uncertain and the future just like the past would be the present to it.

— Pierre Simon Laplace, A Philosophical Essay on Probabilities

This intellect is often referred to as Laplace's demon (in the same vein as Maxwell's demon) and sometimes Laplace's Superman (after Hans Reichenbach). Laplace, himself, did not use the word "demon", which was a later embellishment. As translated into English above, he simply referred to: "Une intelligence ... Rien ne serait incertain pour elle, et l'avenir comme le passé, serait présent à ses yeux."

Even though Laplace is generally credited with having first formulated the concept of causal determinism, in a philosophical context the idea was actually widespread at the time, and can be found as early as 1756 in Maupertuis' 'Sur la Divination'. As well, Jesuit scientist Boscovich first proposed a version of scientific determinism very similar to Laplace's in his 1758 book Theoria philosophiae naturalis.

== Laplace transforms ==
As early as 1744, Euler, followed by Lagrange, had started looking for solutions in the form:

$$z = \int X(x) e^{ax} \, dx\text{  and  }z = \int X(x) x^a \, dx.$$

for certain differential equations. Laplace extended this technique of integral transforms with his own extensive study. However development and widespread application of the modern Laplace transform which has the form:

$$F(s) = \int_0^\infty f(t) e^{-st}\, dt$$

dates from the work of Gustav Doetsch in 1920s.

== Other discoveries and accomplishments ==
=== Mathematics ===
Among the other discoveries of Laplace in pure and applied mathematics are:

- Discussion, contemporaneously with Alexandre-Théophile Vandermonde, of the general theory of determinants, (1772);
- Proof that every equation of an odd degree must have at least one real quadratic factor;
- Laplace's method for approximating integrals
- Solution of the linear partial differential equation of the second order;
- He was the first to consider the difficult problems involved in equations of mixed differences, and to prove that the solution of an equation in finite differences of the first degree and the second order might always be obtained in the form of a continued fraction;
- In his theory of probabilities:
  - de Moivre–Laplace theorem that approximates binomial distribution with a normal distribution
  - Evaluation of several common definite integrals;
  - General proof of the Lagrange reversion theorem.

=== Surface tension ===
Laplace built upon the qualitative work of the English polymath Thomas Young to develop the theory of capillary action and the Young–Laplace equation.

=== Speed of sound ===
Laplace in 1816 was the first to point out that the speed of sound in air depends on the heat capacity ratio. Newton's original theory gave too low a value, because it does not take account of the adiabatic compression of the air which results in a local rise in temperature and pressure. Laplace's investigations in practical physics were confined to those carried on by him jointly with Lavoisier in the years 1782 to 1784 on the specific heat of various bodies.

== Politics ==
=== Minister of the Interior ===
In his early years, Laplace was careful never to become involved in politics, or indeed in life outside the Académie des sciences. He prudently withdrew from Paris during the most violent part of the Revolution.

In November 1799, immediately after seizing power in the coup of 18 Brumaire, Napoleon appointed Laplace to the post of Minister of the Interior. The appointment, however, lasted only six weeks, after which Lucien Bonaparte, Napoleon's brother, was given the post. Evidently, once Napoleon's grip on power was secure, there was no need for a prestigious but inexperienced scientist in the government. Napoleon later (in his Mémoires de Sainte Hélène) wrote of Laplace's dismissal as follows:

Geometrician of the first rank, Laplace was not long in showing himself a worse than average administrator; from his first actions in office we recognized our mistake. Laplace did not consider any question from the right angle: he sought subtleties everywhere, conceived only problems, and finally carried the spirit of "infinitesimals" into the administration.

Grattan-Guinness, however, describes these remarks as "tendentious", since there seems to be no doubt that Laplace "was only appointed as a short-term figurehead, a place-holder while Napoleon consolidated power".

=== From Bonaparte to the Bourbons ===
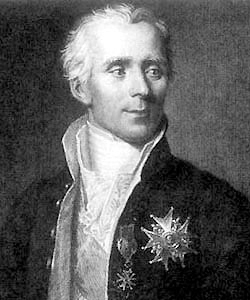
Laplace

Although Laplace was removed from office, it was desirable to retain his allegiance. He was accordingly raised to the senate, and to the third volume of the Mécanique céleste he prefixed a note that of all the truths therein contained the most precious to the author was the declaration he thus made of his devotion towards the peacemaker of Europe. In copies sold after the Bourbon Restoration this was struck out. (Pearson points out that the censor would not have allowed it anyway.) In 1814 it was evident that the empire was falling; Laplace hastened to tender his services to the Bourbons, and in 1817 during the Restoration he was rewarded with the title of marquis.

According to Rouse Ball, the contempt that his more honest colleagues felt for his conduct in the matter may be read in the pages of Paul Louis Courier. His knowledge was useful on the numerous scientific commissions on which he served, and, says Rouse Ball, probably accounts for the manner in which his political insincerity was overlooked.

Roger Hahn in his 2005 biography disputes this portrayal of Laplace as an opportunist and turncoat, pointing out that, like many in France, he had followed the debacle of Napoleon's Russian campaign with serious misgivings. The Laplaces, whose only daughter Sophie had died in childbirth in September 1813, were in fear for the safety of their son Émile, who was on the eastern front with the emperor. Napoleon had originally come to power promising stability, but it was clear that he had overextended himself, putting the nation at peril. It was at this point that Laplace's loyalty began to weaken. Although he still had easy access to Napoleon, his personal relations with the emperor cooled considerably. As a grieving father, he was particularly cut to the quick by Napoleon's insensitivity in an exchange related by Jean-Antoine Chaptal: "On his return from the rout in Leipzig, he [Napoleon] accosted Mr Laplace: 'Oh! I see that you have grown thin—Sire, I have lost my daughter—Oh! that's not a reason for losing weight. You are a mathematician; put this event in an equation, and you will find that it adds up to zero.'"

=== Political philosophy ===
In the second edition (1814) of the Essai philosophique, Laplace added some revealing comments on politics and governance. Since it is, he says, "the practice of the eternal principles of reason, justice and humanity that produce and preserve societies, there is a great advantage to adhere to these principles, and a great inadvisability to deviate from them". Noting "the depths of misery into which peoples have been cast" when ambitious leaders disregard these principles, Laplace makes a veiled criticism of Napoleon's conduct: "Every time a great power intoxicated by the love of conquest aspires to universal domination, the sense of liberty among the unjustly threatened nations breeds a coalition to which it always succumbs." Laplace argues that "in the midst of the multiple causes that direct and restrain various states, natural limits" operate, within which it is "important for the stability as well as the prosperity of empires to remain". States that transgress these limits cannot avoid being "reverted" to them, "just as is the case when the waters of the seas whose floor has been lifted by violent tempests sink back to their level by the action of gravity".

About the political upheavals he had witnessed, Laplace formulated a set of principles derived from physics to favour evolutionary over revolutionary change:

Let us apply to the political and moral sciences the method founded upon observation and calculation, which has served us so well in the natural sciences. Let us not offer fruitless and often injurious resistance to the inevitable benefits derived from the progress of enlightenment; but let us change our institutions and the usages that we have for a long time adopted only with extreme caution. We know from past experience the drawbacks they can cause, but we are unaware of the extent of ills that change may produce. In the face of this ignorance, the theory of probability instructs us to avoid all change, especially to avoid sudden changes which in the moral as well as the physical world never occur without a considerable loss of vital force.

In these lines, Laplace expressed the views he had arrived at after experiencing the Revolution and the Empire. He believed that the stability of nature, as revealed through scientific findings, provided the model that best helped to preserve the human species. "Such views," Hahn comments, "were also of a piece with his steadfast character."

In the Essai philosophique, Laplace also illustrates the potential of probabilities in political studies by applying the law of large numbers to justify the candidates’ integer-valued ranks used in the Borda method of voting, with which the new members of the Academy of Sciences were elected. Laplace’s verbal argument is so rigorous that it can easily be converted into a formal proof.

== Death ==
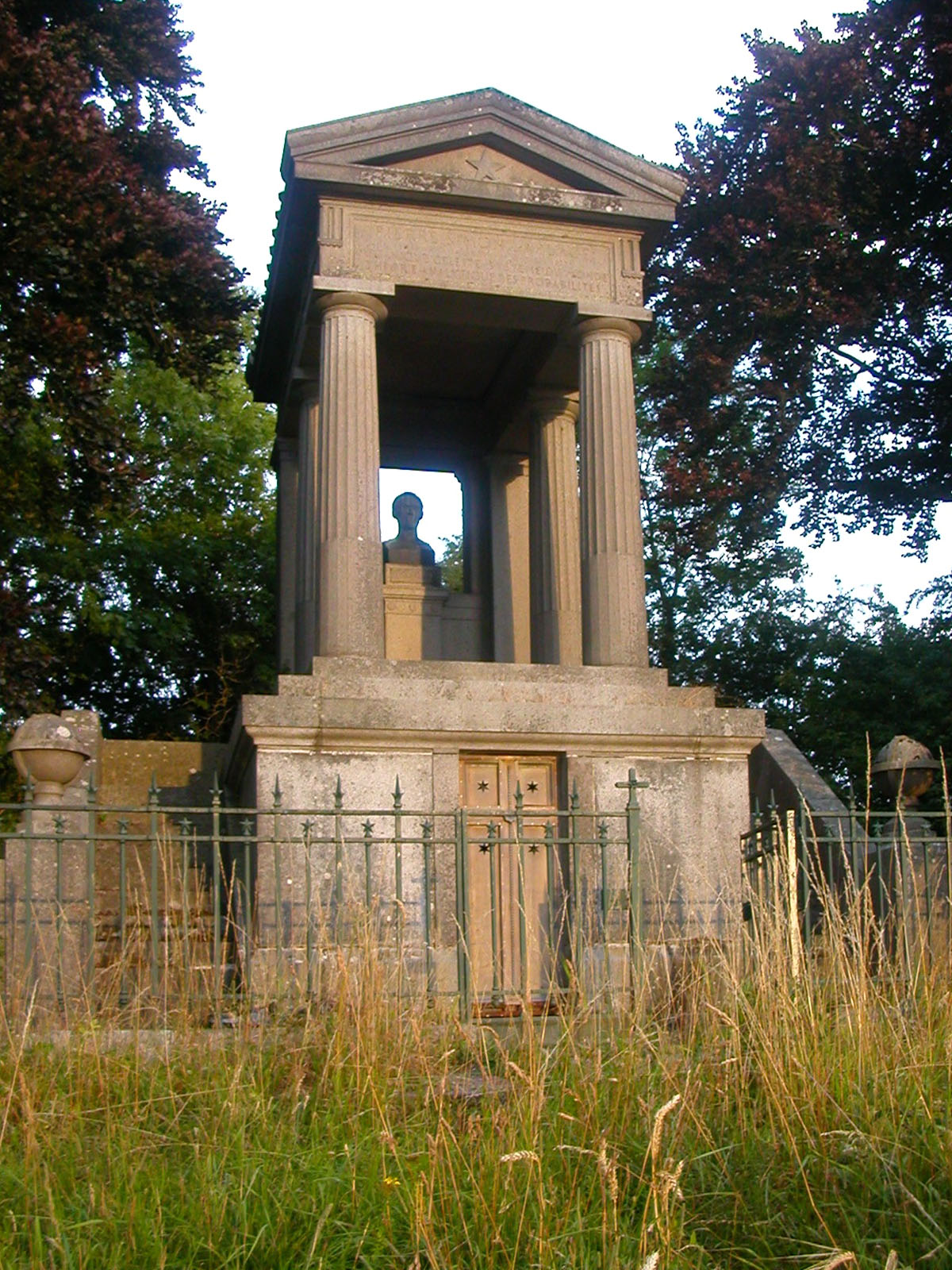
Tomb of Pierre-Simon Laplace

Laplace died in Paris on 5 March 1827, which was the same day Alessandro Volta died. His brain was removed by his physician, François Magendie, and kept for many years, eventually being displayed in a roving anatomical museum in Britain. It was reportedly smaller than the average brain. Laplace was buried at Père Lachaise in Paris but in 1888 his remains were moved to Saint Julien de Mailloc in the canton of Orbec and reinterred on the family estate. The tomb is situated on a hill overlooking the village of St Julien de Mailloc, Normandy, France.

== Religious opinions ==
=== I had no need of that hypothesis ===
A frequently cited but potentially apocryphal interaction between Laplace and Napoleon purportedly concerns the existence of God. Although the conversation in question did occur, the exact words Laplace used and his intended meaning are not known. A typical version is provided by Rouse Ball:

Laplace went in state to Napoleon to present a copy of his work, and the following account of the interview is well authenticated, and so characteristic of all the parties concerned that I quote it in full. Someone had told Napoleon that the book contained no mention of the name of God; Napoleon, who was fond of putting embarrassing questions, received it with the remark, 'M. Laplace, they tell me you have written this large book on the system of the universe, and have never even mentioned its Creator.' Laplace, who, though the most supple of politicians, was as stiff as a martyr on every point of his philosophy, drew himself up and answered bluntly, Je n'avais pas besoin de cette hypothèse-là. ("I had no need of that hypothesis.") Napoleon, greatly amused, told this reply to Lagrange, who exclaimed, Ah! c'est une belle hypothèse; ça explique beaucoup de choses. ("Ah, it is a fine hypothesis; it explains many things.")

An earlier report, although without the mention of Laplace's name, is found in Antommarchi's The Last Moments of Napoleon (1825):

Je m'entretenais avec L ..... je le félicitais d'un ouvrage qu'il venait de publier et lui demandais comment le nom de Dieu, qui se reproduisait sans cesse sous la plume de Lagrange, ne s'était pas présenté une seule fois sous la sienne. C'est, me répondit-il, que je n'ai pas eu besoin de cette hypothèse. ("While speaking with L ..... I congratulated him on a work which he had just published and asked him how the name of God, which appeared endlessly in the works of Lagrange, didn't occur even once in his. He replied that he had no need of that hypothesis.")

In 1884, however, the astronomer Hervé Faye affirmed that this account of Laplace's exchange with Napoleon presented a "strangely transformed" (étrangement transformée) or garbled version of what had actually happened. It was not God that Laplace had treated as a hypothesis, but merely his intervention at a determinate point:

In fact Laplace never said that. Here, I believe, is what truly happened. Newton, believing that the secular perturbations which he had sketched out in his theory would in the long run end up destroying the Solar System, says somewhere that God was obliged to intervene from time to time to remedy the evil and somehow keep the system working properly. This, however, was a pure supposition suggested to Newton by an incomplete view of the conditions of the stability of our little world. Science was not yet advanced enough at that time to bring these conditions into full view. But Laplace, who had discovered them by a deep analysis, would have replied to the First Consul that Newton had wrongly invoked the intervention of God to adjust from time to time the machine of the world (la machine du monde) and that he, Laplace, had no need of such an assumption. It was not God, therefore, that Laplace treated as a hypothesis, but his intervention in a certain place.

Laplace's younger colleague, the astronomer François Arago, who gave his eulogy before the French Academy in 1827, told Faye of an attempt by Laplace to keep the garbled version of his interaction with Napoleon out of circulation. Faye writes:

I have it on the authority of M. Arago that Laplace, warned shortly before his death that that anecdote was about to be published in a biographical collection, had requested him [Arago] to demand its deletion by the publisher. It was necessary to either explain or delete it, and the second way was the easiest. But, unfortunately, it was neither deleted nor explained.

The Swiss-American historian of mathematics Florian Cajori appears to have been unaware of Faye's research, but in 1893 he came to a similar conclusion. Stephen Hawking said in 1999, "I don't think that Laplace was claiming that God does not exist. It's just that he doesn't intervene, to break the laws of Science."

The only eyewitness account of Laplace's interaction with Napoleon is from the entry for 8 August 1802 in the diary of the British astronomer Sir William Herschel:

The first Consul then asked a few questions relating to Astronomy and the construction of the heavens to which I made such answers as seemed to give him great satisfaction. He also addressed himself to Mr Laplace on the same subject, and held a considerable argument with him in which he differed from that eminent mathematician. The difference was occasioned by an exclamation of the first Consul, who asked in a tone of exclamation or admiration (when we were speaking of the extent of the sidereal heavens): 'And who is the author of all this!' Mons. De la Place wished to shew that a chain of natural causes would account for the construction and preservation of the wonderful system. This the first Consul rather opposed. Much may be said on the subject; by joining the arguments of both we shall be led to 'Nature and nature's God'.

Since this makes no mention of Laplace's saying, "I had no need of that hypothesis," Daniel Johnson argues that "Laplace never used the words attributed to him." Arago's testimony, however, appears to imply that he did, only not in reference to the existence of God.

=== Views on God ===
Raised a Catholic, Laplace appears in adult life to have inclined to deism (presumably his considered position, since it is the only one found in his writings). However, some of his contemporaries thought he was an atheist, while a number of recent scholars have described him as agnostic.

Faye thought that Laplace "did not profess atheism", but Napoleon, on Saint Helena, told General Gaspard Gourgaud, "I often asked Laplace what he thought of God. He owned that he was an atheist." Roger Hahn, in his biography of Laplace, mentions a dinner party at which "the geologist Jean-Étienne Guettard was staggered by Laplace's bold denunciation of the existence of God." It appeared to Guettard that Laplace's atheism "was supported by a thoroughgoing materialism." But the chemist Jean-Baptiste Dumas, who knew Laplace well in the 1820s, wrote that Laplace "provided materialists with their specious arguments, without sharing their convictions."

Hahn states: "Nowhere in his writings, either public or private, does Laplace deny God's existence." Expressions occur in his private letters that appear inconsistent with atheism. On 17 June 1809, for instance, he wrote to his son, "Je prie Dieu qu'il veille sur tes jours. Aie-Le toujours présent à ta pensée, ainsi que ton père et ta mère [I pray that God watches over your days. Let Him be always present to your mind, as also your father and your mother]." Ian S. Glass, quoting Herschel's account of the celebrated exchange with Napoleon, writes that Laplace was "evidently a deist like Herschel".

In Exposition du système du monde, Laplace quotes Newton's assertion that "the wondrous disposition of the Sun, the planets and the comets, can only be the work of an all-powerful and intelligent Being." This, says Laplace, is a "thought in which he [Newton] would be even more confirmed, if he had known what we have shown, namely that the conditions of the arrangement of the planets and their satellites are precisely those which ensure its stability." By showing that the "remarkable" arrangement of the planets could be entirely explained by the laws of motion, Laplace had eliminated the need for the "supreme intelligence" to intervene, as Newton had "made" it do. Laplace cites with approval Leibniz's criticism of Newton's invocation of divine intervention to restore order to the Solar System: "This is to have very narrow ideas about the wisdom and the power of God." He evidently shared Leibniz's astonishment at Newton's belief "that God has made his machine so badly that unless he affects it by some extraordinary means, the watch will very soon cease to go."

In a group of manuscripts, preserved in relative secrecy in a black envelope in the library of the Académie des sciences and published for the first time by Hahn, Laplace mounted a deist critique of Christianity. It is, he writes, the "first and most infallible of principles ... to reject miraculous facts as untrue." As for the doctrine of transubstantiation, it "offends at the same time reason, experience, the testimony of all our senses, the eternal laws of nature, and the sublime ideas that we ought to form of the Supreme Being." It is the sheerest absurdity to suppose that "the sovereign lawgiver of the universe would suspend the laws that he has established, and which he seems to have maintained invariably."

Laplace also ridiculed the use of probability in theology. Even following Pascal's reasoning presented in Pascal's wager, it is not worth making a bet, for the hope of profit – equal to the product of the value of the testimonies (infinitely small) and the value of the happiness they promise (which is significant but finite) – must necessarily be infinitely small.

In old age, Laplace remained curious about the question of God and frequently discussed Christianity with the Swiss astronomer Jean-Frédéric-Théodore Maurice. He told Maurice that "Christianity is quite a beautiful thing" and praised its civilising influence. Maurice thought that the basis of Laplace's beliefs was, little by little, being modified, but that he held fast to his conviction that the invariability of the laws of nature did not permit of supernatural events. After Laplace's death, Poisson told Maurice, "You know that I do not share your [religious] opinions, but my conscience forces me to recount something that will surely please you." When Poisson had complimented Laplace about his "brilliant discoveries", the dying man had fixed him with a pensive look and replied, "Ah! We chase after phantoms [chimères]." These were his last words, interpreted by Maurice as a realisation of the ultimate "vanity" of earthly pursuits. Laplace received the last rites from the curé of the Missions Étrangères (in whose parish he was to be buried) and the curé of Arcueil.

According to his biographer, Roger Hahn, it is "not credible" that Laplace "had a proper Catholic end", and he "remained a skeptic" to the very end of his life. Laplace in his last years has been described as an agnostic.

=== Excommunication of a comet ===
In 1470 the humanist scholar Bartolomeo Platina wrote that Pope Callixtus III had asked for prayers for deliverance from the Turks during a 1456 appearance of Halley's Comet. Platina's account does not accord with Church records, which do not mention the comet. Laplace is alleged to have embellished the story by claiming the Pope had "excommunicated" Halley's comet. What Laplace actually said, in Exposition du système du monde (1796), was that the Pope had ordered the comet to be "exorcised" (conjuré). It was Arago, in Des Comètes en général (1832), who first spoke of an excommunication.

== Honors ==
- Correspondent of the Royal Institute of the Netherlands in 1809.
- Foreign Honorary Member of the American Academy of Arts and Sciences in 1822.
- The asteroid 4628 Laplace is named for Laplace.
- A spur of the Montes Jura on the Moon is known as Promontorium Laplace.
- His name is one of the 72 names inscribed on the Eiffel Tower.
- The tentative working name of the European Space Agency Europa Jupiter System Mission is the "Laplace" space probe.
- A train station in the RER B in Arcueil bears his name.
- A street in Verkhnetemernitsky (near Rostov-on-Don, Russia).
- The Institute of Electrical and Electronics Engineers (IEEE) Signal Processing Society's Early Career Technical Achievement Award is named in his honor.

== Quotations ==
- I had no need of that hypothesis. ("Je n'avais pas besoin de cette hypothèse-là", allegedly as a reply to Napoleon, who had asked why he hadn't mentioned God in his book on astronomy.)
- It is therefore obvious that ... (Frequently used in the Celestial Mechanics when he had proved something and mislaid the proof, or found it clumsy. Notorious as a signal for something true, but hard to prove.)
- If we seek a cause wherever we perceive symmetry, it is not that we regard a symmetrical event as less possible than the others, but, since this event ought to be the effect of a regular cause or that of chance, the first of these suppositions is more probable than the second.
- The more extraordinary the event, the greater the need of its being supported by strong proofs.
- "We are so far from knowing all the agents of nature and their diverse modes of action that it would not be philosophical to deny phenomena solely because they are inexplicable in the actual state of our knowledge. But we ought to examine them with an attention all the more scrupulous as it appears more difficult to admit them."
  - This is restated in Theodore Flournoy's work From India to the Planet Mars as the Principle of Laplace or, "The weight of the evidence should be proportioned to the strangeness of the facts."
  - Most often repeated as "The weight of evidence for an extraordinary claim must be proportioned to its strangeness." (see also: Sagan standard)
- This simplicity of ratios will not appear astonishing if we consider that all the effects of nature are only mathematical results of a small number of immutable laws.
- Infinitely varied in her effects, nature is only simple in her causes.
- What we know is little, and what we are ignorant of is immense. (Fourier comments: "This was at least the meaning of his last words, which were articulated with difficulty.")
- One sees in this essay that the theory of probabilities is basically only common sense reduced to a calculus. It makes one estimate accurately what right-minded people feel by a sort of instinct, often without being able to give a reason for it.

== List of works ==
- Traité de mécanique céleste (in French). Vol. 1. Paris: Charles Crapelet. 1799.
- Traité de mécanique céleste (in French). Vol. 2. Paris: Charles Crapelet. 1799.
- Traité de mécanique céleste (in French). Vol. 3. Paris: Charles Crapelet. 1802.
- Traité de mécanique céleste (in French). Vol. 4. Paris: Charles Crapelet. 1805.
- Traité de mécanique céleste (in French). Vol. 5. Paris: Charles Louis Étienne Bachelier. 1852.
- Précis de l'histoire de l'astronomie (in Italian). Milano: Angelo Stanislao Brambilla. 1823.
- Exposition du système du monde (in French). Paris: Charles Louis Étienne Bachelier. 1824.
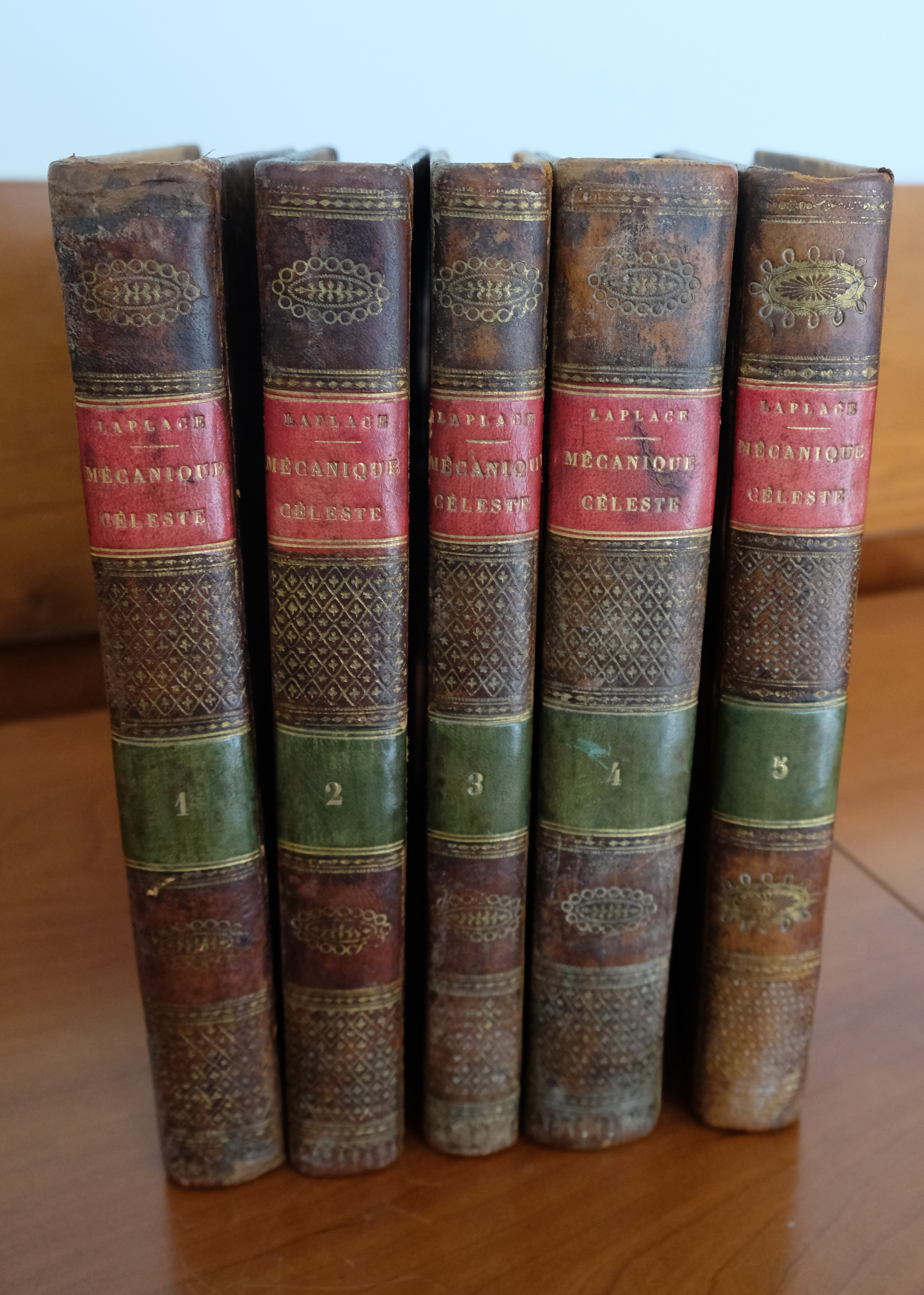
Volumes 1-5 of Pierre-Simon Laplace's "Traité de mécanique céleste" (1799)

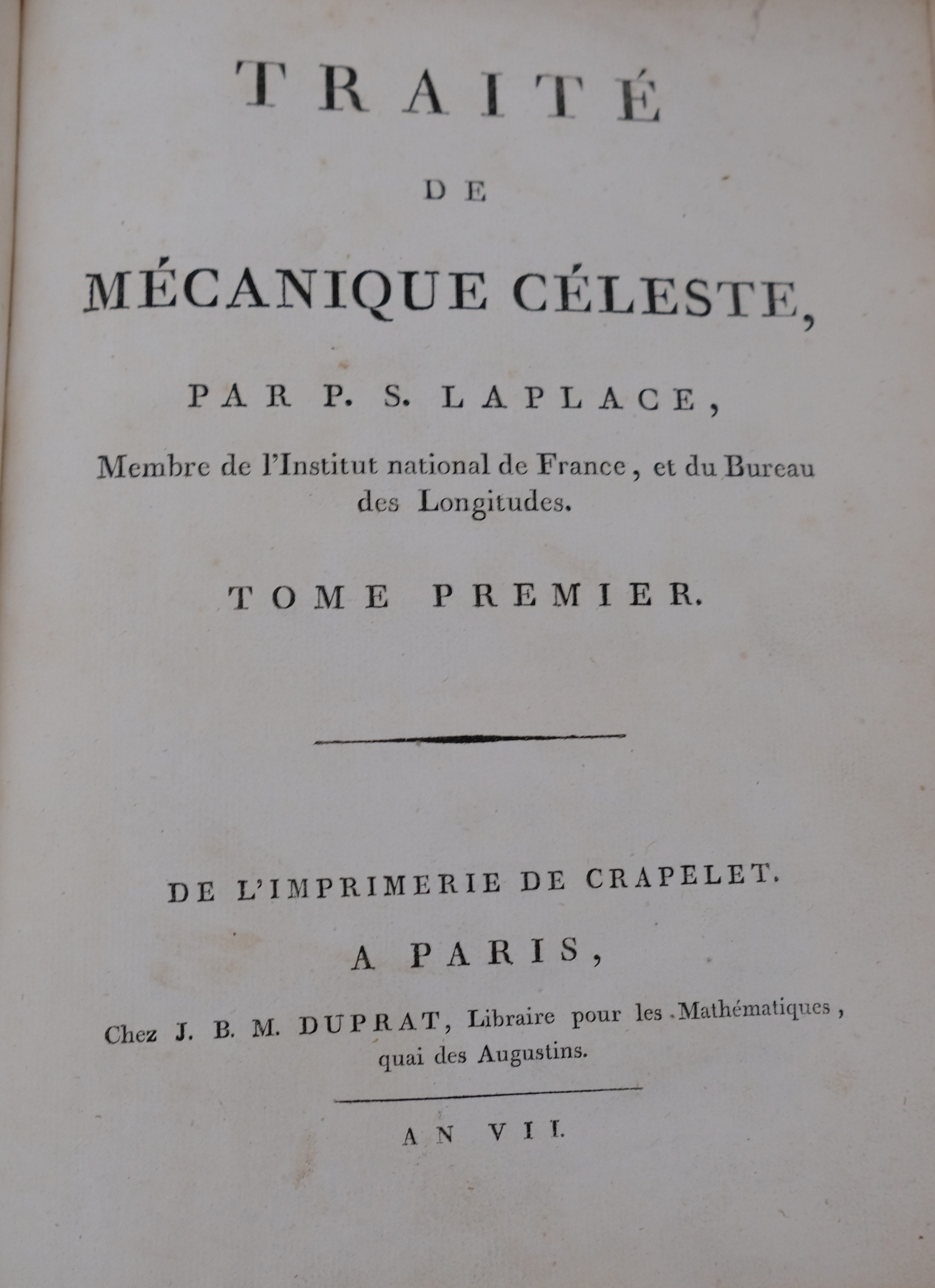
Title page to Volume I of "Traité de mécanique céleste" (1799)

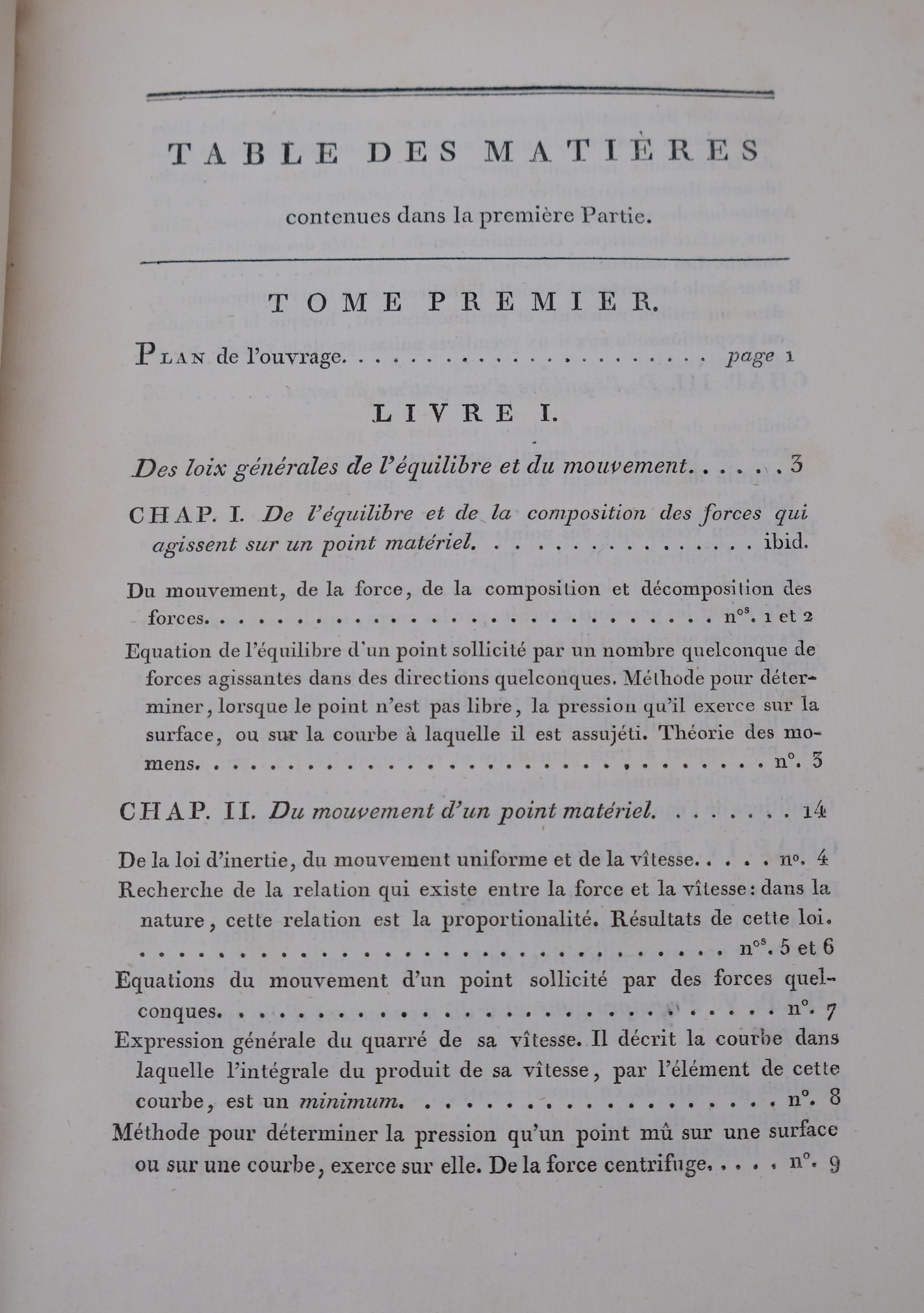
Table of contents to Volume I of "Traité de mécanique céleste" (1799)

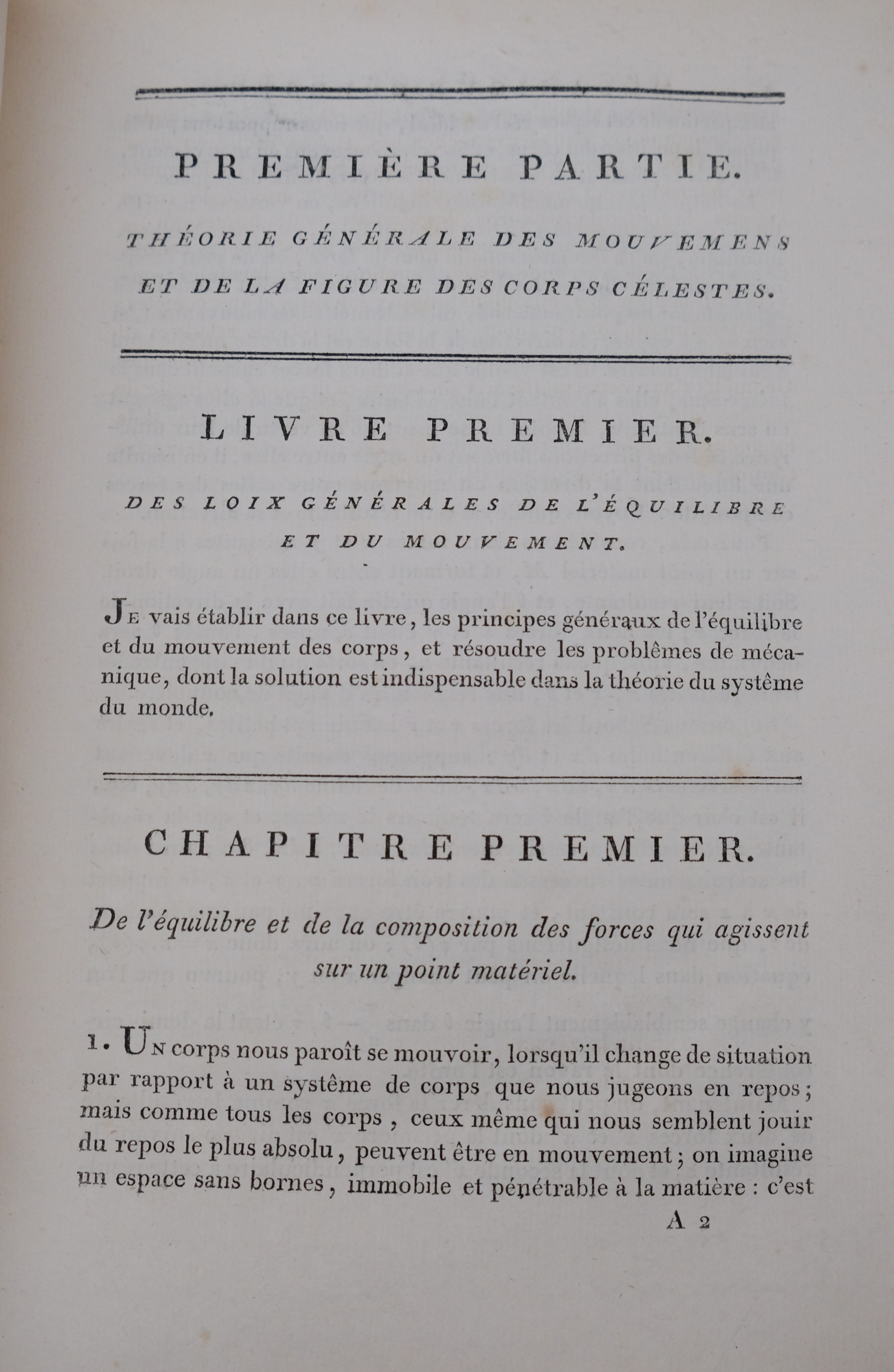
First page of Volume I of "Traité de mécanique céleste" (1799)

== Bibliography ==
- Œuvres complètes de Laplace, 14 vol. (1878–1912), Paris: Gauthier-Villars (copy from Gallica in French)
- Théorie du movement et de la figure elliptique des planètes (1784) Paris (not in Œuvres complètes)
- Précis de l'histoire de l'astronomie
- Alphonse Rebière, Mathématiques et mathématiciens, 3rd edition Paris, Nony & Cie, 1898.

=== English translations ===
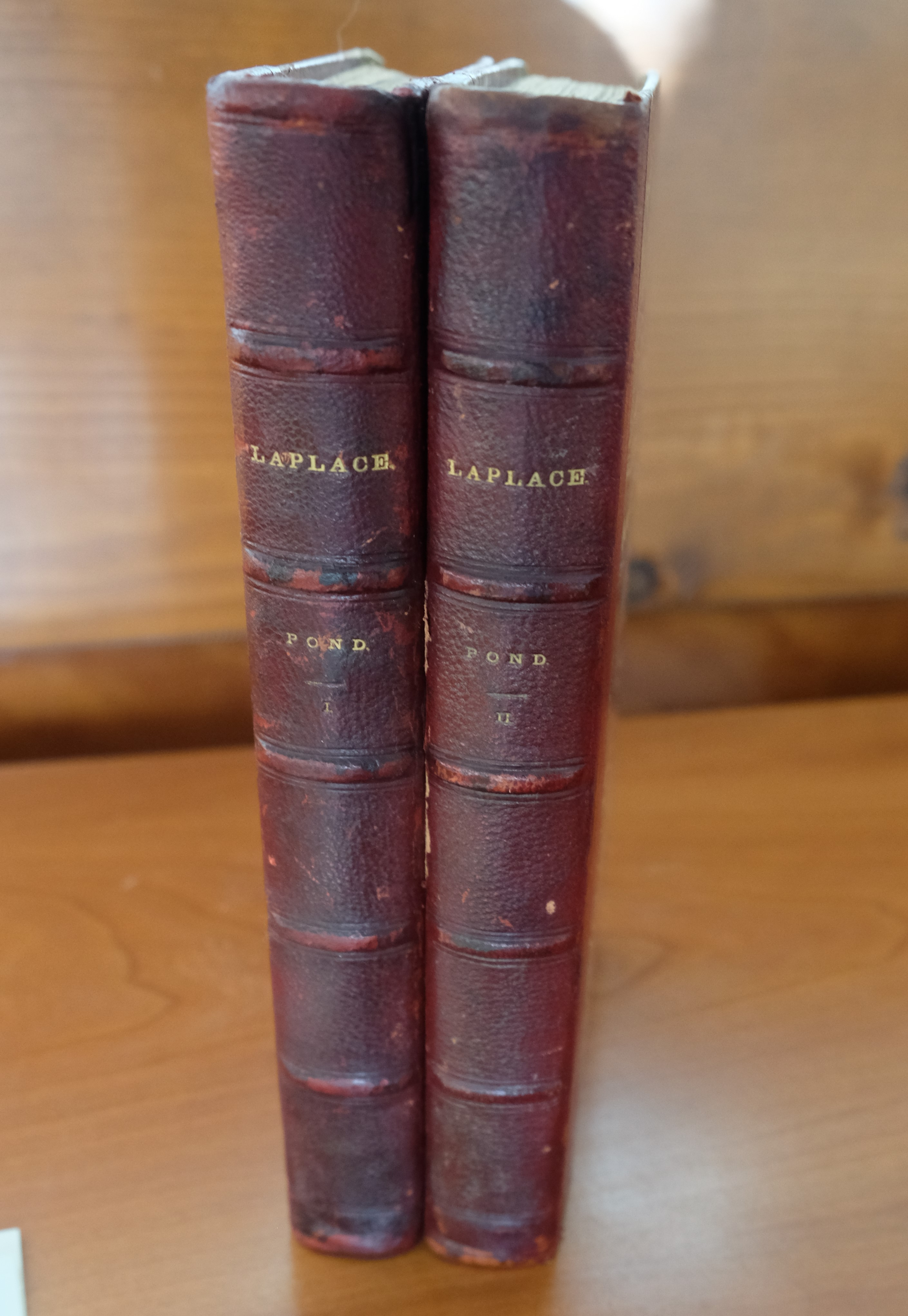
- Volumes 1 and 2 of "System of the World" (1809)
  Bowditch, N. (trans.) (1829–1839) Mécanique céleste, 4 vols, Boston
  - New edition by Reprint Services ISBN 0-7812-2022-X
- – [1829–1839] (1966–1969) Celestial Mechanics, 5 vols, including the original French
- Pound, J. (trans.) (1809) The System of the World, 2 vols, London: Richard Phillips
- _ The System of the World (v.1)
- _ The System of the World (v.2)
- – [1809] (2007) The System of the World, vol.1, Kessinger, ISBN 1-4326-5367-9
- Toplis, J. (trans.) (1814) A treatise upon analytical mechanics Nottingham: H. Barnett
- Laplace, Pierre Simon Marquis De (2007) [1902]. A Philosophical Essay on Probabilities. Translated by Truscott, F.W. & Emory, F.L. Cosimo. ISBN 978-1-60206-328-0., translated from the French 6th ed. (1840)
  - A Philosophical Essay on Probabilities (1902) at the Internet Archive
- Dale, Andrew I.; Laplace, Pierre-Simon (1995). Philosophical Essay on Probabilities. Sources in the History of Mathematics and Physical Sciences. Vol. 13. Translated by Andrew I. Dale. Springer. doi:10.1007/978-1-4612-4184-3. hdl:2027/coo1.ark:/13960/t3126f008. ISBN 978-1-4612-8689-9., translated from the French 5th ed. (1825)

== See also ==
- History of the metre
- Laplace–Bayes estimator
- Ratio estimator
- Seconds pendulum
- List of things named after Pierre-Simon Laplace
- Pascal's wager

Political offices
Preceded by Nicolas Marie Quinette	Minister of the Interior; 12 November 1799 – 25 December 1799	Succeeded by Lucien Bonaparte
