= Saint-Cyr-du-Ronceray =

- Part of Valorbiquet
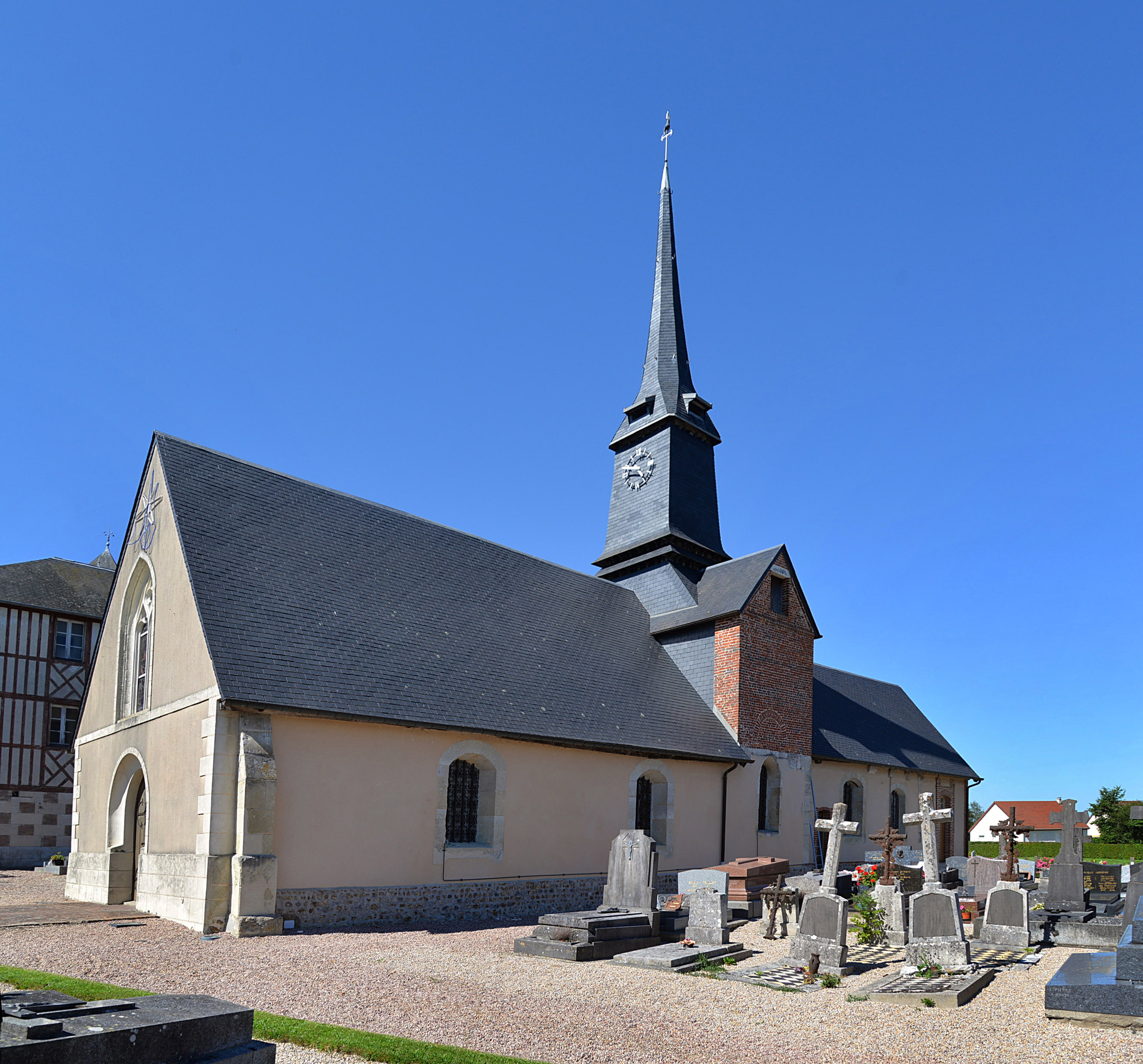
- Church of Saint-Cyr-du-Ronceray

- Coat of arms
- Location of Saint-Cyr-du-Ronceray
- Location within France Location within Normandy
- Coordinates: 49°03′14″N 0°17′55″E
- Country: France
- Region: Normandy
- Department: Calvados
- Arrondissement: Lisieux
- Canton: Livarot-Pays-d'Auge
- Commune: Valorbiquet
- Area^{1}: 4.03 km^{2} (1.56 sq mi)
- Elevation: 225 m (738 ft)
- Highest elevation: 183 m (600 ft)
- Lowest elevation: 99 m (325 ft)
- Population (2023): 703
  - Density: 174/km^{2} (452/sq mi)
- Time zone: UTC+01:00 (CET)
  - Summer (DST): UTC+02:00 (CEST)
- Postal code: 14290
- ^{1} French Land Register data, which excludes lakes, ponds, glaciers > 1 km^{2} (0.386 sq mi or 247 acres) and river estuaries.

Saint-Cyr-du-Ronceray (French pronunciation: [sɛ̃ siʁ dy ʁɔ̃sʁɛ]) is a former commune in the Calvados department in the Normandy region in northwestern France. On 1 January 2016, it was merged into the new commune of Valorbiquet.

== See also ==
- Communes of the Calvados department
