= Christophe Gadbled =

French mathematician

Christophe Gadbled (1732–1782) was professor of mathematics and hydrography at the University of Caen Normandy.

Gadbled was born in Saint-Martin-le-Bouillant on 29 November 1732, and died in Caen on 11 October 1782. Robert Fox describes him as a "modern-minded mathematician", who had a particular influence on Pierre-Simon Laplace.

== Selected works ==
- Exposé des quelques unes des vérités rigoureusement démontrées par les géomètres et rejetées par l'auteur du "Compendium de physique", Caen, 1775
- Exercice sur la théorie de la navigation, Caen, 1779
