= La Chapelle-Yvon =

- Part of Valorbiquet
- Location of La Chapelle-Yvon
- Location within France Location within Normandy
- Coordinates: 49°03′53″N 0°20′27″E
- Country: France
- Region: Normandy
- Department: Calvados
- Arrondissement: Lisieux
- Canton: Livarot-Pays-d'Auge
- Commune: Valorbiquet
- Area^{1}: 7.01 km^{2} (2.71 sq mi)
- Elevation: 91 m (299 ft)
- Highest elevation: 169 m (554 ft)
- Lowest elevation: 71 m (233 ft)
- Population (2023): 543
  - Density: 77.5/km^{2} (201/sq mi)
- Time zone: UTC+01:00 (CET)
  - Summer (DST): UTC+02:00 (CEST)
- Postal code: 14290
- ^{1} French Land Register data, which excludes lakes, ponds, glaciers > 1 km^{2} (0.386 sq mi or 247 acres) and river estuaries.

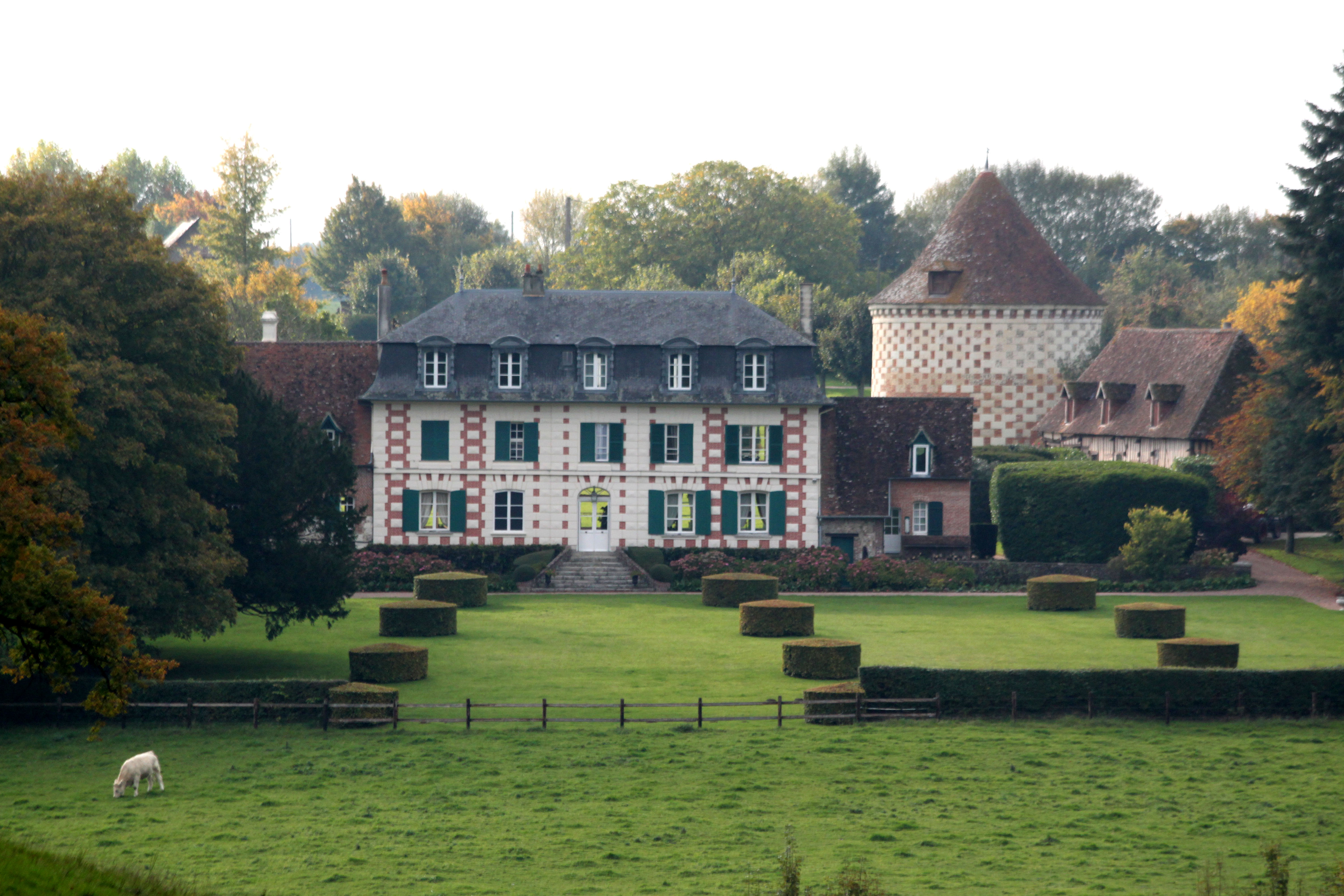
Château du Besneray

La Chapelle-Yvon (French pronunciation: [la ʃapɛl ivɔ̃]) is a former commune in the Calvados department in the Normandy region in northwestern France. On 1 January 2016, it was merged into the new commune of Valorbiquet.

== See also ==
- Communes of the Calvados department
