= Valorbiquet =

- Commune
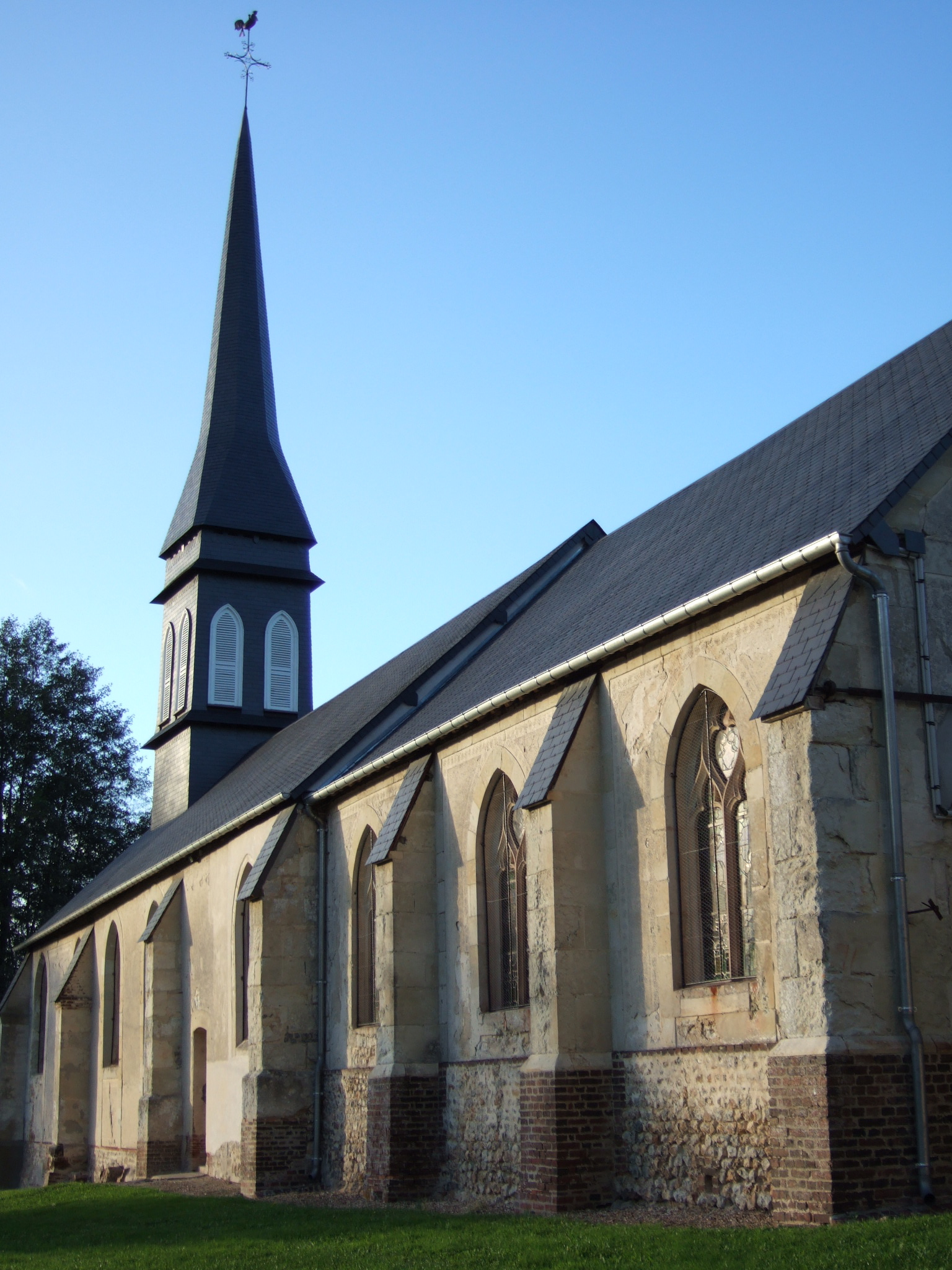
- The church in Saint-Julien-de-Mailloc
- Location of Valorbiquet
- Location within France Location within Normandy
- Coordinates: 49°03′07″N 0°17′53″E
- Country: France
- Region: Normandy
- Department: Calvados
- Arrondissement: Lisieux
- Canton: Livarot-Pays-d'Auge
- Intercommunality: CA Lisieux Normandie
- Area^{1}: 28.66 km^{2} (11.07 sq mi)
- Population (2023): 2,439
  - Density: 85.10/km^{2} (220.4/sq mi)
- Time zone: UTC+01:00 (CET)
  - Summer (DST): UTC+02:00 (CEST)
- INSEE/Postal code: 14570 /14290
- ^{1} French Land Register data, which excludes lakes, ponds, glaciers > 1 km^{2} (0.386 sq mi or 247 acres) and river estuaries.

Valorbiquet (French pronunciation: [valɔʁbikɛ]) is a commune in the department of Calvados, northwestern France. The municipality was established on 1 January 2016 by merger of the former communes of La Chapelle-Yvon, Saint-Cyr-du-Ronceray, Saint-Julien-de-Mailloc, Saint-Pierre-de-Mailloc and Tordouet.

== Population ==
Population data refer to the commune in its geography as of January 2025.

Historical population
| Year | Pop. | ±% p.a. |
|---|---|---|
| 1968 | 1,595 | — |
| 1975 | 1,541 | −0.49% |
| 1982 | 1,902 | +3.05% |
| 1990 | 2,220 | +1.95% |
| 1999 | 2,219 | −0.01% |
| 2007 | 2,368 | +0.82% |
| 2012 | 2,436 | +0.57% |
| 2017 | 2,508 | +0.58% |
| 2023 | 2,439 | −0.46% |
Source: INSEE

== See also ==
- Communes of the Calvados department
