= Saint-Pierre-de-Mailloc =

- Part of Valorbiquet
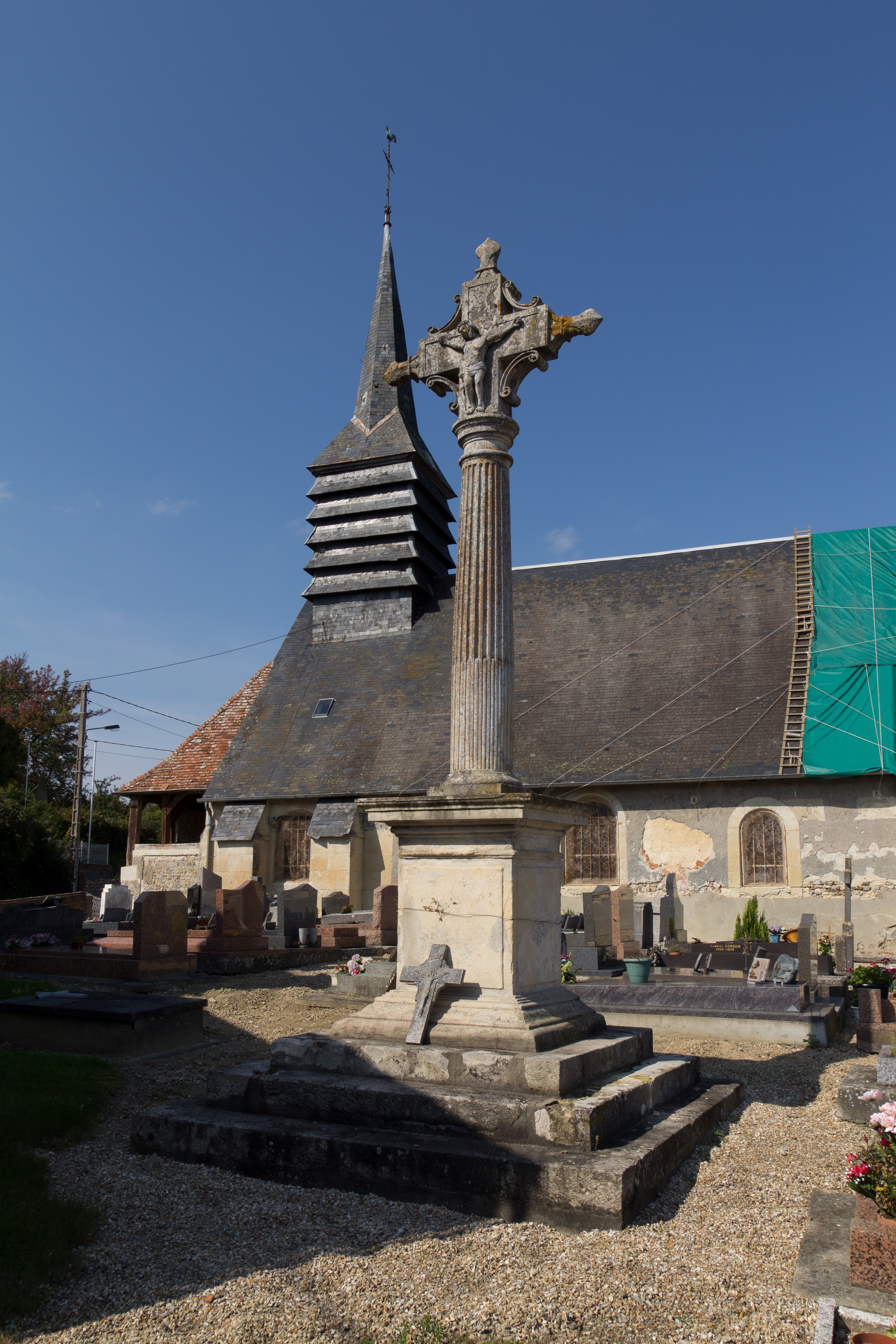

- Coat of arms
- Location of Saint-Pierre-de-Mailloc
- Location within France Location within Normandy
- Coordinates: 49°04′06″N 0°19′08″E
- Country: France
- Region: Normandy
- Department: Calvados
- Arrondissement: Lisieux
- Canton: Livarot-Pays-d'Auge
- Commune: Valorbiquet
- Area^{1}: 4.68 km^{2} (1.81 sq mi)
- Elevation: 113 m (371 ft)
- Highest elevation: 166 m (545 ft)
- Lowest elevation: 67 m (220 ft)
- Population (2023): 483
  - Density: 103/km^{2} (267/sq mi)
- Time zone: UTC+01:00 (CET)
  - Summer (DST): UTC+02:00 (CEST)
- Postal code: 14290
- ^{1} French Land Register data, which excludes lakes, ponds, glaciers > 1 km^{2} (0.386 sq mi or 247 acres) and river estuaries.

Saint-Pierre-de-Mailloc (French pronunciation: [sɛ̃ pjɛʁ də majo]) is a former commune in the Calvados department in the Normandy region in northwestern France. On 1 January 2016, it was merged into the new commune of Valorbiquet.

== See also ==
- Communes of the Calvados department
