= Tordouet =

- Part of Valorbiquet
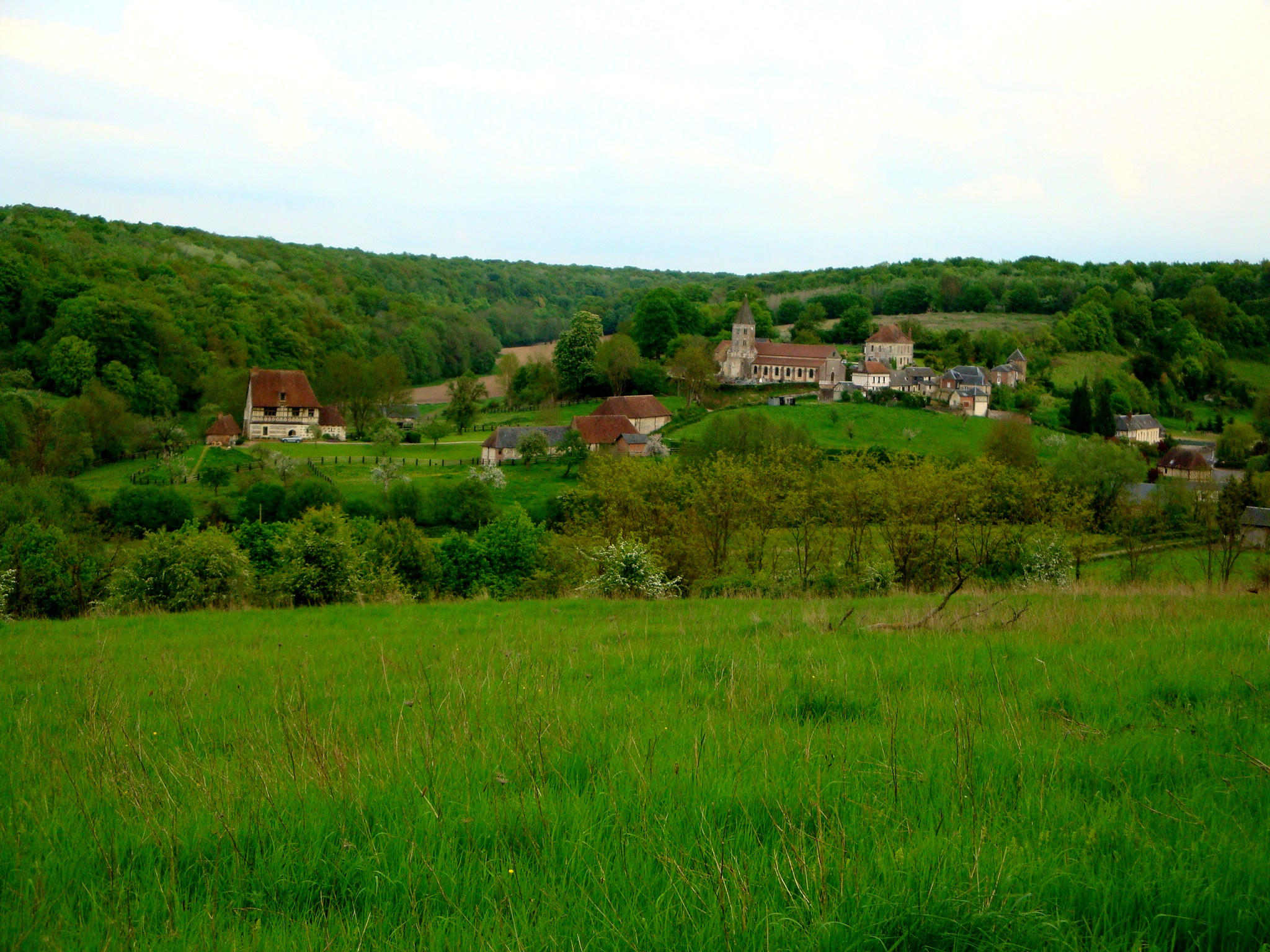

- Coat of arms
- Location of Tordouet
- Location within France Location within Normandy
- Coordinates: 49°03′01″N 0°19′51″E
- Country: France
- Region: Normandy
- Department: Calvados
- Arrondissement: Lisieux
- Canton: Livarot-Pays-d'Auge
- Commune: Valorbiquet
- Area^{1}: 6.76 km^{2} (2.61 sq mi)
- Elevation: 100 m (330 ft)
- Highest elevation: 181 m (594 ft)
- Lowest elevation: 88 m (289 ft)
- Population (2022): 267
  - Density: 39.5/km^{2} (102/sq mi)
- Time zone: UTC+01:00 (CET)
  - Summer (DST): UTC+02:00 (CEST)
- Postal code: 14290
- ^{1} French Land Register data, which excludes lakes, ponds, glaciers > 1 km^{2} (0.386 sq mi or 247 acres) and river estuaries.

Tordouet (French pronunciation: [tɔʁdwɛ]) is a former commune in the Calvados department in the Normandy region in northwestern France. On 1 January 2016, it was merged into the new commune of Valorbiquet.

== Population ==
Historical population

Year	Pop.	±% p.a.
1793	1,275	—
1821	1,295	+0.06%
1846	1,023	−0.94%
1872	725	−1.32%
1901	385	−2.16%
1926	301	−0.98%
1946	298	−0.05%
1962	280	−0.39%

Year	Pop.	±% p.a.
1968	273	−0.42%
1975	245	−1.53%
1982	271	+1.45%
1990	256	−0.71%
1999	293	+1.51%
2006	284	−0.44%
2022	267	−0.39%

Source: EHESS and INSEE

== See also ==
- Communes of the Calvados department
