= Saint-Julien-de-Mailloc =

- Part of Valorbiquet
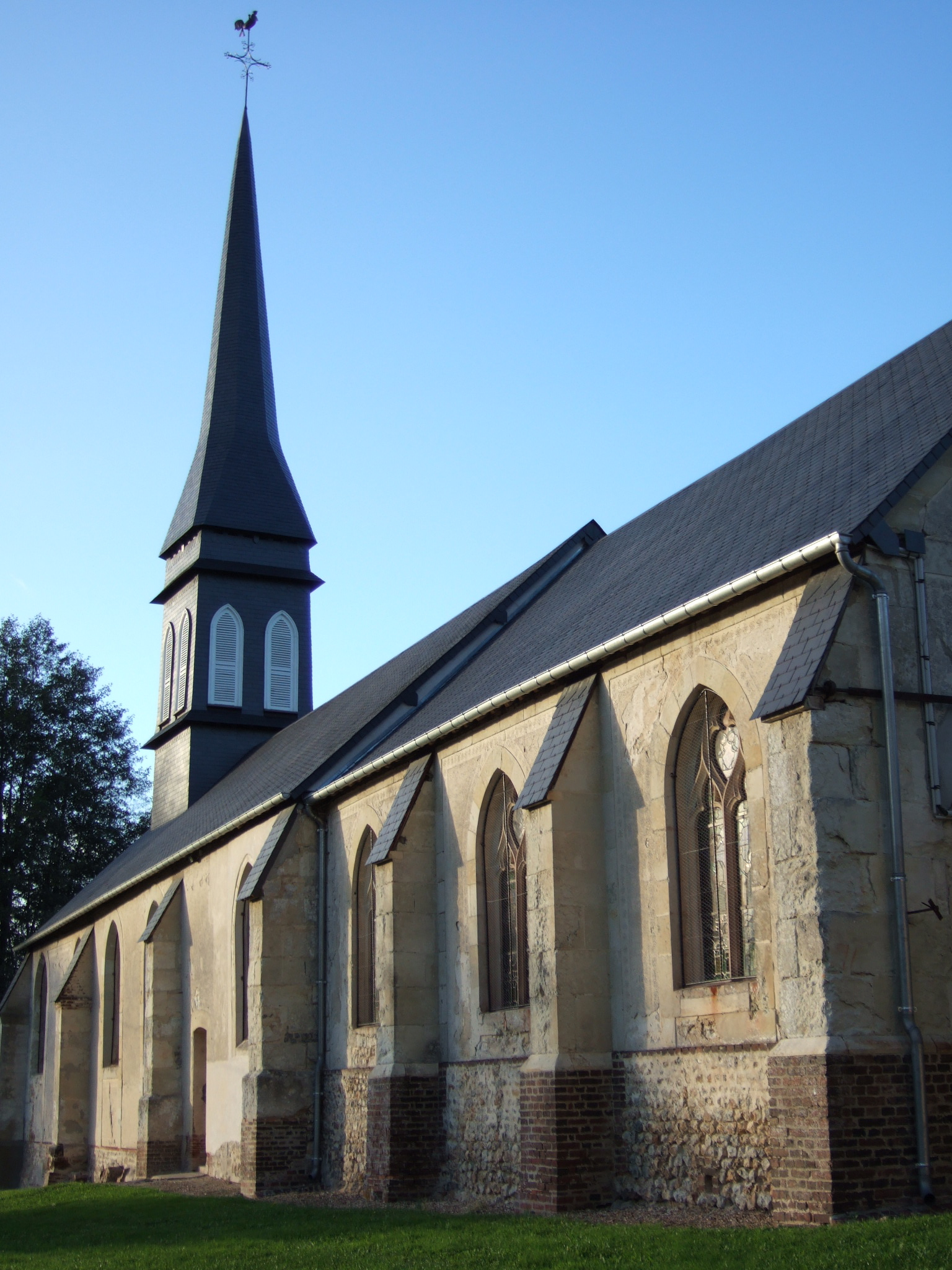
- Location of Saint-Julien-de-Mailloc
- Location within France Location within Normandy
- Coordinates: 49°04′54″N 0°19′11″E
- Country: France
- Region: Normandy
- Department: Calvados
- Arrondissement: Lisieux
- Canton: Livarot-Pays-d'Auge
- Commune: Valorbiquet
- Area^{1}: 6.18 km^{2} (2.39 sq mi)
- Elevation: 170 m (560 ft)
- Highest elevation: 173 m (568 ft)
- Lowest elevation: 67 m (220 ft)
- Population (2023): 443
  - Density: 71.7/km^{2} (186/sq mi)
- Time zone: UTC+01:00 (CET)
  - Summer (DST): UTC+02:00 (CEST)
- Postal code: 14290
- ^{1} French Land Register data, which excludes lakes, ponds, glaciers > 1 km^{2} (0.386 sq mi or 247 acres) and river estuaries.

Saint-Julien-de-Mailloc (French pronunciation: [sɛ̃ jyljɛ̃ də majo]) is a former commune in the Calvados department in the Normandy region in northwestern France. On 1 January 2016, it was merged into the new commune of Valorbiquet.

== See also ==
- Communes of the Calvados department
