= Świerkosz =

Świerkosz (pronounced [ˈɕfjɛrkɔʂ]) is a Polish-language surname, derived from the word świerk ("spruce"). It may refer to:

- Alfred Świerkosz (1900–1968), Polish writer
- Barbara Grzybowska-Świerkosz (born 1937), Polish chemist
- Jan Świerkosz (born 1922), Polish communist politician
- Krzysztof Świerkosz (born 1966), Polish poet
