= Bogdan Baranowski =

Polish chemist (1927–2014)

- Born: October 27, 1927; Kępno, Second Polish Republic
- Died: June 29, 2014 (aged 86); Warsaw, Poland
- Education: University of Wrocław; Wrocław University of Science and Technology
- Known for: research on solid state physical chemistry and non-equilibrium thermodynamics discovery of nickel hydride Stroka-Baranowski effect
- Awards: Bourke Award (1973); Bridgman Award (1995)
- Scientific career
- Fields: physical chemistry; thermodynamics
- Workplaces: Jagiellonian University; Polish Academy of Sciences

Bogdan Baranowski (born 27 October 1927 – 29 June 2014) was a Polish chemist and Professor at the Institute of Physical Chemistry of the Polish Academy of Sciences (PAN) in Warsaw. He served as President of the Polish Chemical Society between 1973 and 1979. He is known for his theoretical and experimental research in linear and non-linear non-equilibrium thermodynamics and solid state physical chemistry.

== Life and career ==
He studied chemistry at the University of Wrocław and the Wrocław University of Science and Technology between 1947 and 1951. He became an assistant to Professor Kazimierz Gumiński at the Department of Physical Chemistry. He subsequently continued his scientific work at the newly established Department of Theoretical Chemistry at the Jagiellonian University in Kraków until 1956 when he joined the Institute of Physical Chemistry of the Polish Academy of Sciences in Warsaw. He obtained the title of professor in 1964. In 1951, he became a member of the Polish Chemical Society. He then served as President of the organization between 1973–1979 and was appointed its honorary president in 1997. In 1973, he became a corresponding member of the Polish Academy of Sciences and in 1991 he obtained the full membership status.

He was also a member of many international academies and societies including the German National Academy of Sciences Leopoldina in Halle, the Deutsche Bunsen Gesellschaft für Physikalische Chemie, German Chemical Society, Federation of European Chemical Societies, European High Pressure Research Group (EHPRG) and the Ukrainian Academy of Sciences. In the years 1989–1993, he served as President of the International Association for the Advancement of High Pressure Science and Technology (AIRAPT).

He was a visiting professor at Freiberg University of Mining and Technology, where he conducted lectures on irreversible thermodynamics (1971–1972), the University of Hannover, and the Solid State Physics Institute of the Max Planck Society in Stuttgart. He authored or co-authored several hundred papers and monographs. He served as the editor-in-chief of the Polish Journal of Chemistry since 1991. He also was a member of editorial boards of Journal of Non-Equilibrium Thermodynamics, Journal of Alloys and Compounds and High Pressure Research.

== Awards ==
- Marie Skłodowska-Curie Award (1973)
- Bourke Award and Bourke Lecture of the Royal Society of Chemistry (1973)
- Jędrzej Śniadecki Medal of the Polish Chemical Society (1984)
- August Wilhelm von Hofmann Lecutre of the German Chemical Society (1994)
- Prime Minister of Poland Award (1994)
- Bridgman Award of the International Association for the Advancement of High Pressure Science and Technology (1995)

== Selected publications ==
- Nierównowagowa termodynamika w chemii fizycznej (1974)
- High Pressure Chemical Synthesis (with J. Jurczak, 1989)
- Free Energy of Hydride Formation in Pd-Ni Alloys (with Lidia Dębowska, 2005)
- The Nature of Phase Transition in Me-H Systems. Coherent and Incoherent Equilibria (with Lidia Dębowska, 2005)
- The Vanishing of Thermoelectric Effects in Superconductors (with Lidia Dębowska, 2008)

== See also ==
- List of Polish chemists
- Timeline of Polish science and technology
