= Adolfo del Campo =

Spanish physicist (born 1981)

- Born: 1981 (age 44–45); Bilbao, Basque Country, Spain
- Education: University of Basque Country
- Known for: Shortcuts to adiabaticity Kibble-Zurek mechanism Quantum speed limit
- Awards: J. R. Oppenheimer Fellowship (2011)
- Scientific career
- Fields: Quantum Physics
- Workplaces: Imperial College London; Los Alamos National Laboratory; University of Massachusetts; Donostia International Physics Center; University of Luxembourg

Adolfo del Campo (born 1981, Bilbao, Spain) is a Spanish physicist and a professor of physics at the University of Luxembourg. He is best known for his work in quantum control and theoretical physics. He is notable as one of the pioneers of shortcuts to adiabaticity. He was elected a Fellow of the American Physical Society in 2023.

== Education ==
Del Campo was educated at the University of the Basque Country, The University of Texas at Austin, and The University of North Carolina at Chapel Hill. He completed his Ph.D. at the University of the Basque Country in 2008. He was a postdoctoral research associate at Imperial College London. He was awarded a Distinguished J. Robert Oppenheimer Fellowship at Los Alamos National Laboratory.

== Career ==
In 2014, he became an associate professor at the University of Massachusetts. He was an Ikerbasque Research Professor at the Donostia International Physics Center (2019-2020) and is a full professor at the University of Luxembourg. He has held visiting positions at several universities, including the National Autonomous University of Mexico, the University of Kyoto, Los Alamos National Laboratory, and Institut Henri Poincaré. During his career, del Campo has published over 100 peer-reviewed papers. He has contributed to developing shortcuts to adiabaticity, quantum speed limits, quantum heat engines and the Kibble–Zurek mechanism.

== Research ==
Del Campo has contributed significantly to the development of shortcuts to adiabaticity, which are techniques designed to efficiently prepare quantum states. His work has extended their application to encompass many-body quantum systems with continuous variables and spin degrees of freedom. These extensions have led to novel quantum algorithms combining the quantum circuit model of quantum computation with shortcuts to adiabaticity.

In partnership with Muga and Ruschhaupt, Del Campo edited the comprehensive volume titled "Time in Quantum Mechanics". He has generalized the time-energy uncertainty relation by introducing quantum speed limits in open quantum systems and classical systems.

Working on quantum thermodynamics, Del Campo proposed using shortcuts to adiabaticity to enhance the performance of quantum heat engines and bounding the output power by means of quantum speed limits. This approach motivated experiments demonstrating the suppression of quantum friction and the realization of superadiabatic quantum engines. In collaboration with Jaramillo and Beau, Dr. Del Campo conducted pioneering theoretical research showcasing the quantum supremacy of many-body thermodynamic devices, establishing the superior performance of heat engines employing many-body working substances compared to their classical counterparts.

Del Campo's contributions to the field of phase transitions expanded upon the Kibble–Zurek mechanism, which explains the creation of topological defects upon crossing critical points in both classical and quantum systems. Del Campo, in collaboration with Kibble and Zurek, introduced the Inhomogeneous Kibble-Zurek mechanism, a concept that involves spatially local driving to minimize defect formation during phase transitions. This prediction has undergone experimental validation using various systems, including trapped ions and ultracold gases. Additionally, Del Campo's work has uncovered universal features beyond the traditional Kibble-Zurek mechanism. He predicted the fluctuations in the number of topological defects to be universal, with confirmation achieved through experiments using D-Wave devices.

== Awards ==
- Distinguished J. R. Oppenheimer Fellow, Los Alamos National Laboratory - 2011
- Leon Heller PDPA Publication Award, Los Alamos National Laboratory - 2014
- Fellow of the American Physical Society, 2023

== See also ==
- Kibble-Zurek mechanism
- Shortcuts to adiabaticity
- Quantum speed limit
- Quantum heat engines

== Selected bibliography ==
- Time in Quantum Mechanics - Vol. 2, Gonzalo Muga, Andreas Ruschhaupt, Adolfo del Campo (Eds.), (Springer LNP, 2011).
- Assisted Finite-Rate Adiabatic Passage Across a Quantum Critical Point: Exact Solution for the Quantum Ising Model, Adolfo del Campo, Marek M. Rams, and Wojciech H. Zurek Phys. Rev. Lett. 109, 115703 (2012).
- Shortcuts to adiabaticity by counterdiabatic driving, Adolfo del Campo, Phys. Rev. Lett. 111, 100502 (2013).
- Quantum speed limits in open system dynamics, A. del Campo, I. L. Egusquiza, M. B. Plenio, and S. F. Huelga Phys. Rev. Lett. 110, 050403 (2013).
- Causality and non-equilibrium second-order phase transitions in inhomogeneous systems, A. del Campo, T. W. B. Kibble, W. H. Zurek J. Phys.: Condens. Matter 25, 404210 (2013) .
- Universality of Phase Transition Dynamics: Topological Defects from Symmetry Breaking, Adolfo del Campo and Wojciech H. Zurek, Int. J. Mod. Phys. A 29, 1430018 (2014).
- Quantum speed limits across the quantum-to-classical transition, B. Shanahan, A. Chenu, N. Margolus, and A. del Campo Phys. Rev. Lett. 120, 070401 (2018).
- Universal Statistics of Topological Defects Formed in a Quantum Phase Transition , Adolfo del Campo Phys. Rev. Lett. 121, 200601 (2018).
