= Catherine Nakalembe =

Remote Sensing Scientist

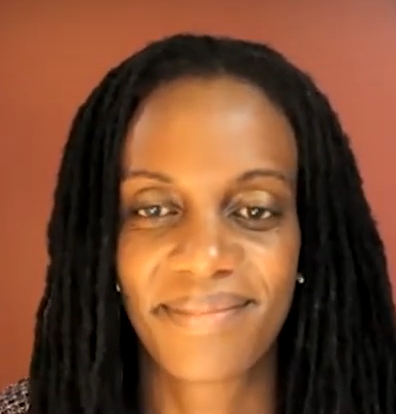
- Born: Kampala, Uganda
- Education: University of Maryland ( Ph.D in Geographical Science ); Johns Hopkins University ( master’s program in geography and environmental engineering ); Makerere University
- Known for: Remote sensing, food security
- Awards: Africa Food Prize, Ugandan Golden Jubilee medal
- Scientific career
- Fields: Remote sensing
- Workplaces: University of Maryland, NASA
- Thesis: Agricultural Land Use, Drought Impacts, and Vulnerability: A Regional Case Study for Karamoja, Uganda.

Catherine Lilian Nakalembe is an Ugandan remote sensing scientist and an associate research professor at the University of Maryland (UMD) in the Department of Geographical Sciences and the NASA Harvest Africa program director. Her research includes drought, agriculture and food security.

In 2020, Nakalembe was awarded the Africa Food Prize and in 2022 the Ugandan Golden Jubilee medal.

== Education ==
In 2007, Nakalembe received her undergraduate degree in Environmental Sciences from Makerere University.

After undergraduate studies, she received a partial scholarship for the master’s program in geography and environmental engineering at the Johns Hopkins University. She received her master's degree in 2009.

Nakalembe received her Ph.D in geographical science at the University of Maryland. Her doctoral research aimed to highlight the consequences of drought on land use and on the lives of North Eastern Ugandans. It was the first step in forming the basis of the remote sensing element of the disaster risk financing project which has supported over 75,000 households in the region since initial scaleup in 2017 and saving the Uganda government resources that would otherwise go towards emergency assistance.

== Work ==
As of 2020, she is the Africa Program Director in the NASA Harvest Program and is known for her work using remote sensing and machine learning technology supporting the development of agriculture and food security across Africa. She pioneered the remote sensing by unmanned aerial vehicles in surveying refugee settlements and landslide mapping in Uganda. She has conducted research in remote sensing of drought, agriculture, and leading the integration of earth observations in agricultural monitoring of small holder agriculture in multiple countries. 84 000 people in Karamoja were able to avoid the worst effects of a lack of rain thanks to her early research.

Nakalembe organizes and leads training on remote sensing tools and data, works with national ministries on their agricultural decision-making processes, and heads initiatives to prevent potentially disastrous impacts of crop failure.

== Recognition ==
She received the Group on Earth Observations first Individual Excellence Award in 2019.

In 2020, she shared the Africa Food Prize (AFP) with Dr. André Bationo from Burkina Faso. Olusegun Obasanjo, Chair of the AFP Committee, stated "We need innovative Africans like Dr. Bationo and Dr. Nakalembe to demonstrate the potential of new knowledge and technology together with practical technologies that help improve the value proposition for farmers. These two are indeed exceptional Africans."

She was a 2020 UMD Research Excellence Honoree. In 2022, she received the Ugandan Golden Jubilee medal. It was presented to her parents by president Yoweri Museveni, and is Uganda's highest award given to civilians. (Note: Not counting the Most Excellent Order of the Pearl of Africa, which is given to heads of state and similar.) The same year, she was joint winner with the African Agricultural Technology Foundation of the Al-Sumait Prize for African Development. The award was given "in recognition of their distinguished achievements in [food security] on the African continent."

== Personal life ==
Nakalembe and her sister grew up in Kampala, Uganda. She played badminton. Her father is a self-taught car mechanic, and as of 2020 her mother owned and operated a restaurant in Makindye. As of 2022, her sister ran sports camps.

Nakalembe entered the environmental science field by chance, as she missed her first preference sports science course when she was enrolling for her undergraduate program at Makerere University early in 2002.

As of 2020, Nakalembe is married to Sebastian Deffner, an associate professor of theoretical physics at the University of Maryland, Baltimore County (UMBC). They have two children.
