= Sebastian Deffner =

German physicist

- Born: Augsburg, Germany
- Citizenship: German
- Education: University of Augsburg
- Known for: Quantum Thermodynamics; Quantum Speed Limits for Open Systems; Shortcuts to Adiabaticity; Quantum Heat Engines and Refrigerators
- Scientific career
- Fields: Quantum Thermodynamics
- Workplaces: University of Augsburg; UMD; Los Alamos National Laboratory; UMBC
- Thesis: Nonequilibrium Entropy Production in Open and Closed Quantum Systems (2010)
- Doctoral advisor: Eric Lutz
- Other academic advisors: Christopher Jarzynski; Wojciech H. Zurek

Sebastian Deffner is a German theoretical physicist and a professor in the Department of Physics at the University of Maryland, Baltimore County (UMBC). He is known for his contributions to the development of quantum thermodynamics with focus on the thermodynamics of quantum information, quantum speed limit for open systems, quantum control and shortcuts to adiabaticity.

== Education ==
Deffner received his Diplom-Physiker (Master of Science) in 2008 from the University of Augsburg; and he received his doctorate from the same university in 2011 under the supervision of Eric Lutz.

== Career ==
From 2008 until 2011, Deffner was a research fellow at the University of Augsburg. From 2011 to 2014, he was a Research Associate in the group of Christopher Jarzynski at the University of Maryland, College Park (UMD) for which he had received the DAAD postdoctoral fellowship. From 2014 to 2016, he took up the position of a Director’s Funded Postdoctoral Fellow with Wojciech H. Zurek at the Los Alamos National Laboratory. Since 2016, he has held a position as a faculty member of the Department of Physics at the University of Maryland, Baltimore County (UMBC), where he leads the quantum thermodynamics group, and a position as a Visiting Professor at the University of Campinas in Brazil.

== Recognition ==
Deffner’s contributions to quantum thermodynamics have been recognized through the 2016 Early Career Award from the New Journal of Physics, as well as the Leon Heller Postdoctoral Publication Prize from the Los Alamos National Laboratory in 2016. Since 2017, Deffner has been a member of the international editorial board for IOP Publishing's Journal of Physics Communications, and since 2019 he has been on the editorial advisory board of the Journal of Non-Equilibrium Thermodynamics, and a member of the Section Board for Quantum Information of Entropy. He is also a member of the inaugural editorial board of PRX Quantum.

- 2017 APS Outstanding Referee (American Physical Society).
- 2016 Leon Heller Postdoctoral Publication Prize (Los Alamos National Laboratory).
- 2016 Early Career Award (New Journal of Physics).

== Personal life ==
As of 2020, Deffner is married to Catherine Nakalembe, a remote sensing scientist. They have 2 children.

== See also ==
- Shortcuts to adiabaticity

== Books ==
- Deffner, Sebastian; Campbell, Steve (2019). Quantum Thermodynamics: An introduction to the thermodynamics of quantum information. IOP Publishing. ISBN 978-1-64327-658-8.
