= Ruth Oniang'o =

Kenyan Professor of nutrition

Prof. Ruth Khasaya Oniang'o PhD, Sc.D
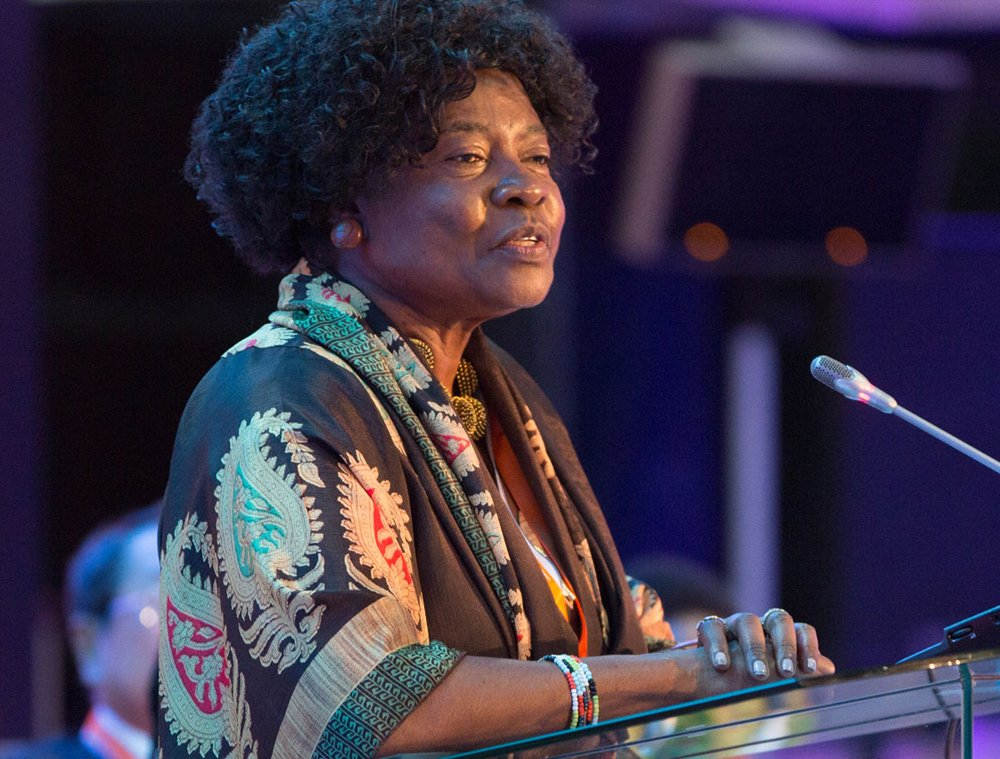
- Born: September 9, 1946 (age 80)
- Education: University of Washington, University of Nairobi
- Occupations: Nutritionist, food scientist, journal editor, Politician, Rural Development Specialist and a Scholar.
- Notable work: African Journal of Food, Agriculture, Nutrition and Development, Rural Outreach Africa
- Title: Member of Parliament
- Term: 2003-2007
- Website: http://www.ruraloutreachafrica.org/ and http://www.ajfand.net/

Ruth Khasaya Oniang'o (born September 9, 1946) is a Kenyan Professor of Nutrition and a former member of Parliament. She created Rural Outreach Africa (ROA) to empower smallholder farmers to reduce malnutrition, she oversaw her country's nutrition policy.

== Life ==
Oniang'o was born in 1946, in Kakamega County. She attended Washington State University where she obtained her bachelor's and master's degrees between 1969 and 1973. She began university teaching in 1978. She finished her education at University of Nairobi. In 1983 she was awarded a PhD by the University of Nairobi in Food Science and Nutrition.

She is a leading nutritionist and became a Professor at Jomo Kenyatta University in Nairobi. Her research focused on topics such as food security, nutrition and pregnancy, childhood nutrition and agricultural processing.

She founded the Rural Outreach Africa, ROA in 1992 to provide smallholder farmers with indigenous soil testing and to create a healthy rural community able to live and enjoy an active dignified life, and to access and utilize both internal and external resources to the full, and willing to contribute fully to the development of families, communities, and the nation while upholding respect for others. Oniang'o is the Founder Editor-in-chief of the African Journal of Food, Agriculture, Nutrition and Development (AJFAND) in 2001 to highlight relevant academic research in the field.

In 2002 she left academia to become active in Kenyan politics. She served in the 9th Kenyan Parliament from 2003 to 2007 and she was the first ever Shadow Minister for Education, Science and Technology. While serving, Oniang'o helped pass the Kenya Biosafety Bill and the Nutritionists and Dietetics Bills. In 2005, Oniang'o established the Diana Elukhambi Health Centre in Kakamega to serve her rural community and in remembrance of her Elder sister Diana, who became the First African Matron of Getrude's Garden Hospital, Nairobi.

In 2018 she was on the board of the UK based NGO the Centre for Agriculture and Bioscience International.

Oniang'o leads her country's Food Security and Nutrition Taskforce who are charged with overseeing the delivery of the National Food and Nutrition Policy. Oniang'o also leads the Rural Outreach Africa, a non-profit organization which supports farmers in food production and agricultural processing. The Rural Outreach Africa works with Kenyan smallholder farmers to promote the growth of indigenous crops like sorghum, cassava, arrowroot, and jute mallow as a solution to ensuring food security and Nutrition.

She has been on the following Boards: Centre for Agriculture and Bioscience International, Board Member KILIMO TRUST, Food Security and Sustainable Development Division of the Economic Commission for Africa (ECA), Institute for Policy Research Analysis (IPAR), Former Board Chair, Sasakawa Africa Association (SAA), International Centre for Soil Fertility and Agricultural Development (IFDC), USA, Nutrition Third World Board, based in Belgium and supports Third World Nutrition Research, Member of Trustees for the International Rice Research Institute, CGIAR Centre, Project Advisory Committee of the HarvestPlus, and CGIAR Challenge Program seeking to enhance bioavailability of nutrients from food crops using conventional mean.

== Awards ==
Oniang'o has won several awards for her work in agriculture and food policy, including the Distinguished Service Medal and Silver Star. In 2014, she was awarded the International Food and Agribusiness Management Association (IFAMA) Lifetime Award. She also won the Africa Food Prize in 2017 for her work with the Rural Outreach Program. On June 22, 2018, Oniang'o was awarded an honorary Doctor of Science degree from University of Aberdeen in recognition of her contributions to her field.

Oniang'o was cited as one of the Top 100 most influential Africans by New African magazine in 2017.
