= William Nellis =

William Nellis may refer to:

- William Harrell Nellis (1916–1944), World War II fighter pilot, for whom Nellis Air Force Base is named
- William J. Nellis (born 1941), American physicist
