= Davemaoite =

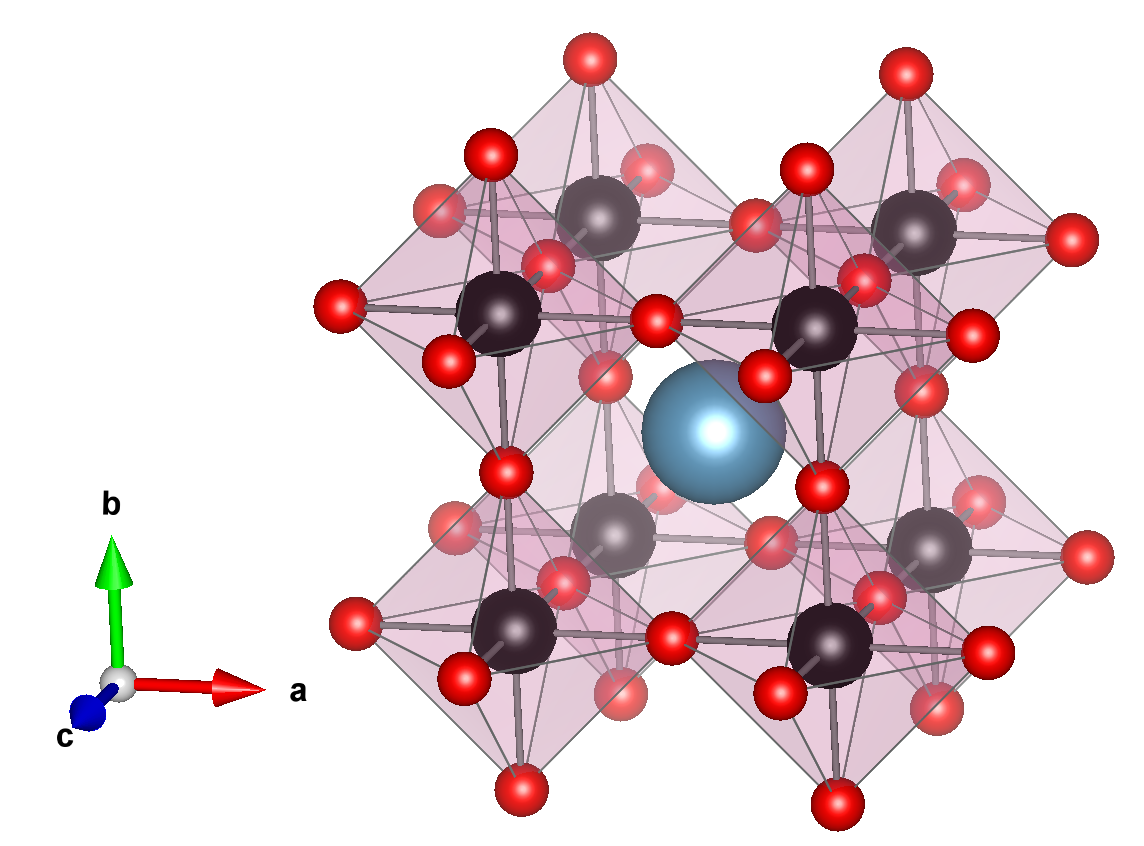
- Steel blue atom is Ca, red atoms are O and black atoms are Si

General
- Category: Silicate
- Formula: CaSiO_{3}
- IMA symbol: Dvm
- Strunz classification: 9.H0
- Crystal system: Isometric
- Crystal class: Cubic
- Space group: Pm3̅m
- Unit cell: a= 3.591 Å

Structure

Identification
- Common impurities: K, Na, Al, Cr

Davemaoite is a high-pressure calcium silicate perovskite (CaSiO_{3}) mineral with a distinctive cubic crystal structure. It is named after geophysicist Ho-kwang (Dave) Mao, who pioneered in many discoveries in high-pressure geochemistry and geophysics.

It is one of three main minerals in Earth's lower mantle, making up around 5–7% of the material there. Significantly, davemaoite can host uranium and thorium, radioactive isotopes which produce heat through radioactive decay and contribute greatly to heating within this region giving the material a major role in how heat flows deep below the Earth's surface.

Davemaoite has been artificially synthesized in the laboratory, but was thought to be too extreme to exist in the Earth's crust. Then in 2021, the mineral was discovered as specks within a diamond that formed between 660 and 900 km beneath the Earth's surface, within the mantle. The diamond had been extracted from the Orapa diamond mine in Botswana. The discovery was made by focusing a high-energy beam of X-rays on precise spots within the diamond using a technique known as synchrotron X-ray diffraction. Subsequently, a reappraisal of the data from the Orapa diamond and its inclusion cast doubt on the attribution to calcium silicate perovskite. Instead, the data were reinterpreted in terms of a diamond from the shallow part of the mantle with inclusions of minerals commonly found in microinclusions.

Calcium silicate is found in other forms, such as wollastonite in the crust and breyite in the middle and lower regions of the mantle. However, davemaoite can exist only at very high pressure of around 200,000 times that found at Earth's surface.

== See also ==
- List of minerals
- Perovskite (structure)
