= André Bationo =

Soil scientist from Burkina Faso

André Bationo is a soil scientist from Burkina Faso. In 2014 he won the UNESCO-Equatorial Guinea International Prize for Research in the Life Sciences for his research into soil fertility management. In 2020 he was the joint winner of the Africa Food Prize, with Catherine Nakalembe.

Bationo was awarded the Africa Food Prize for his work on micro-dosing fertilizer technology, and farmer credit exchange systems. Micro-dosing involves putting a small amount of fertilizer in the planting hole of a crop. This can increase yields over 100% compared to no fertilizer use, but reduces costs when compared with traditional fertilizer application. The credit system allows farmers to store grain when prices are low (and receive credit) and sell when prices are high, increasing their income.
