= Orders, decorations, and medals of Uganda =

The Ugandan honours system consists of orders and medals awarded for exemplary service to the nation.

The current awards are provided for by The National Honours and Awards Act, 2001.

== Orders and medals ==
=== Republic of Uganda ===
| Civilian Orders | Rank / Class | Note |
|---|---|---|
| The Most Excellent Order of the Pearl of Africa | Grand Master | Awarded to heads of state and government. |
| The Excellent Order of the Pearl of Africa | Grand Commander | For spouses of heads of state, vice presidents and crown princes and princesses. |
| The Distinguished Order of The Nile | Class I–V | Named after the River Nile. |
| The Distinguished Order of the Crested Crane | Class I–V | Named after the crested crane, Uganda's national bird. |
| Military Orders | Rank / Class | Note |
| The Order of Katonga | | Named after the decisive battle of the National Resistance Army. |
| The Kabalega Star | I–III | Named after King Kabalega of Bunyoro who resisted the British. |
| The Rwenzori Star | I–III | Named after Rwenzori Mountains. |
| The Masaba Star | | Local name of Mount Elgon. |

List of medals of the Republic of Uganda:

- The National Independence Medal
- The Nalubaale Medal
- The Damu Medal
- The Luwero Triangle Medal
- The Kagera River Medal
- The Kyoga Medal
- The Golden Jubilee Medal of Uganda
