= Ruby pressure scale =

Method used in diamond anvil cells

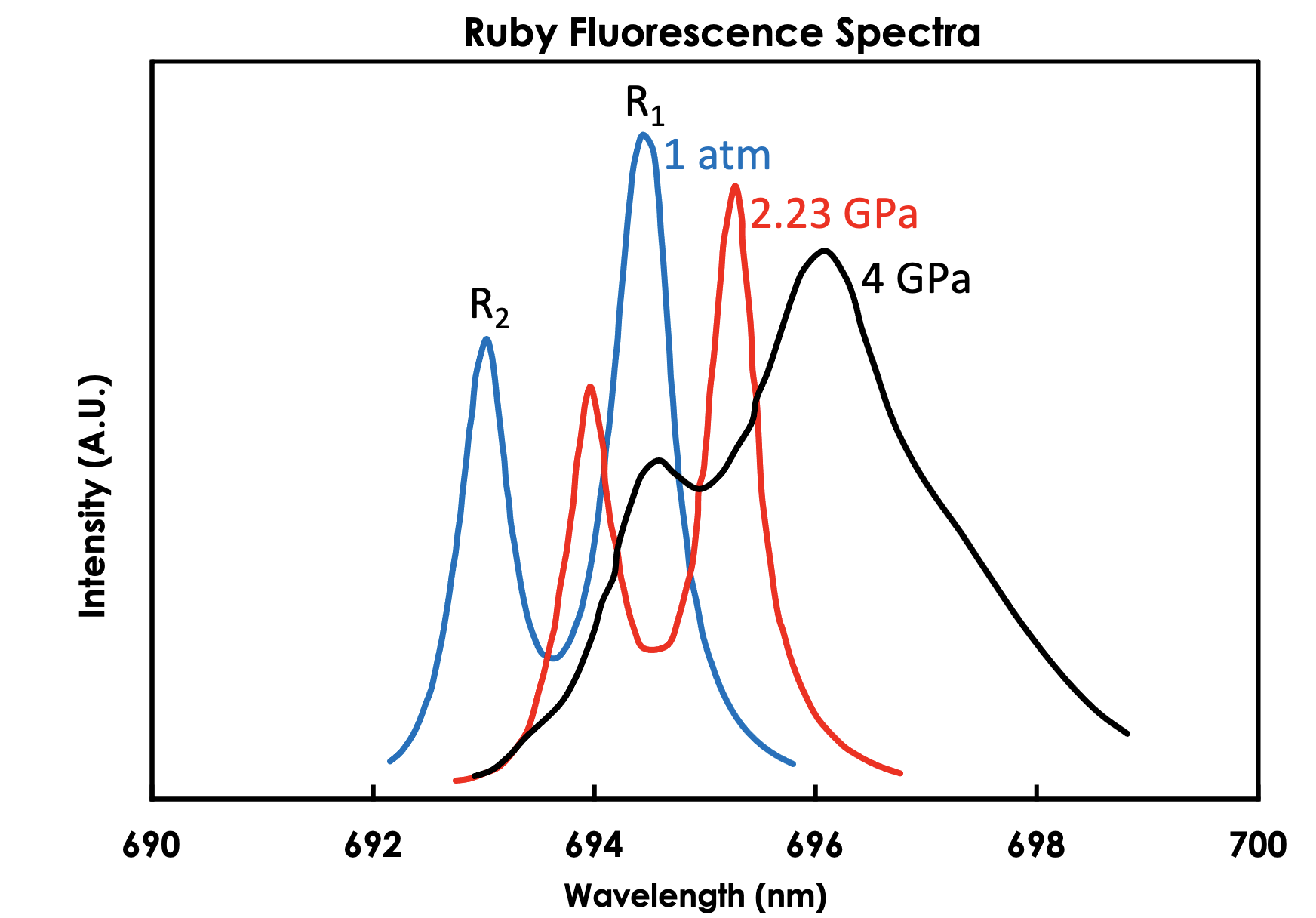
Ruby spectra R1, R2 lines

The ruby fluorescence pressure scale is an optical method to measure pressure within a sample chamber of a diamond anvil cell apparatus. Since it is an optical method, which fully make use of the transparency of diamond anvils and only requires an access to a small scale laser generator, it has become the most prevalent pressure gauge method in high pressure sciences.

== Principles ==
Ruby is chromium-doped corundum (Al_{2}O_{3}). The Cr^{3+} in corundum's lattice forms an octahedra with surrounding oxygen ions. The octahedral crystal field together with spin-orbital interaction results in different energy levels. Once 3d electrons in Cr^{3+} are energized by lasers, the excited electrons would go to ^{4}T_{2} and ^{2}T_{2} levels. Later they return to ^{2}E levels and the R_{1}, R_{2} lines come from luminescence from ^{2}E levels to ^{4}A_{2} ground level. The energy difference of ^{2}E levels are 29 cm^{−1}, corresponding to the splitting of R_{1}, R_{2} lines at 1.39 nm.

== Development ==
Ruby fluorescence spectra has two strong sharp lines, R_{1} and R_{2.} R_{1} refers to the stronger intensity and lower energy (longer wavelength) excitation and is used to gauge pressure.

Pressure is calculated as: $P(Mbar)=\frac{a}{b}[\left ( \frac{\lambda}{\lambda_0} \right )^b-1]$, where λ_{0} is the R_{1} wavelength measured at 1atm, a and b are constants. (e.g. a = 19.04, b = 5)

Since first demonstrated by Forman and colleagues in 1972, many scientists have contributed to the establishment of accurate ruby pressure scale in various experimental conditions.

A likely incomplete summary of is given below:

Year	First Author	a	b	Primary pressure standard used	Temperature	Pressure range	Pressure transmitting medium	References
1972	R. A. Forman	-	-, linear	Transitions of CCl_{4}, H_{2}O, C_{2}H_{5}Br, n-C_{7}H_{16}	Room temperature	2.2 GPa	See standards used	
1978	H. K. Mao	1904	5	Ag, Cu, Mo, Pd	Room temperature	6 - 100 GPa	M-E, H_{2}O	
1986	H. K. Mao	1904	7.665	Cu, Ag, Ar	Room temperature	80 GPa	Ar	
2004	A. Dewaele	1904	9.5	Al, Cu, W	Room temperature	153 GPa	Helium	
2005	A. D. Chijioke	1876(6.7)	10.71(0.14)	Au, Pt	Room temperature	150 GPa	Helium, Hydrogen, Ar	
2008	S.D Jacobsen	1904	10.32(7)	MgO	Room temperature	118 GPa	Helium	
2012	H. Yamaoka	1762*ln(λ/λ_{0})		Ruby R_{1}	Low temperature to 16K	26 GPa	M-E, Silicone oil	
2020	G. Shen	1870	5.63(3)	MgO, Mo, Cu, Diamond	Room temperature	150 GPa	Helium	
