= Golden Jubilee Medal of Uganda =

Golden Jubilee Medal of Uganda Recipients

The Golden Jubilee Medal, also known as the Independence Medal, is awarded by the President of Uganda in recognition of outstanding service and loyalty to Uganda. Honorees are selected by the Presidential Awards Committee, which is responsible for identifying, selecting, vetting and forwarding nominated persons to the President for conferment of the Honors. The awards committee is headed by a Chancellor. It was established in 2012, in memory the 50th anniversary of the country's independence from the United Kingdom.

It is Uganda's highest award given to civilians, not counting the Most Excellent Order of the Pearl of Africa, which is given to heads of state and similar.

== 2022 Golden Jubilee Awardees ==
The 2022 awards were conferred on 26 January, 2022.

Name	Year	Notable as	additional ref
Prof. Patrick Engeu Ogwang	2022	Innovator of Covidex	
Dr. Joseph Brown Kigula-Mugambe	2022		
Prof. Philippa Musoke	2022	Nevirapine Research for HIV-positive mothers	
Dr. Joseph Epodoi	2022		
Dr. Josephine Namugenyi	2022	Medical officer	
Dr. Rev. Sr. Margaret Ajiko Mary	2022	Consultant surgeon	
Dr. Joan Uwantege	2022	Medical officer	
Dr. Innocent Ocen	2022	Intern doctor	
Dr. Amina Nakawesa	2022	Intern doctor	
Dr. Florence Alaroker Senior	2022	Consultant paediatrician	
Dr. Clare Nakubulwa	2022	Medical officer	
Jackson Keem Moding	2022	Senior anesthetic officer	
John Guma Ambaga	2022	Senior anesthetic officer	
Zenaida Kituyi	2022	Anaesthetic officer	
Sr. Medrine Kibetenga	2022	Recovery nurse	
Sr. Sarah Alekat	2022	Recovery nurse	
Sr. Jenipher Ajilong	2022	Instrument nurse	
Daniel Ebwalu	2022	Theatre nurse	
Margaret Ajok	2022	Recovery nurse	
Prof. Monica Chibita	2022	Women Empowerment	
Dr. Catherine Nakalembe	2022	For efforts to improve food security in Africa with Satellite Data	
Peruth Chemutai	2022	Women's 3000m steeplechase Gold Medalist-Tokyo 2020 Olympics in 2021	
Jacob Kiplimo	2022	World Half-Marathon Record Holder	
Charles Mawerere	2022		
Robinah Mwangale Mubeeke	2022		
Frank Kalimuzo (RIP)	2022		
Gollapalli Naga Mohana Rao	2022		
Dr. Stephen Birungi	2022		
Onyach Onecimo Oyoo RIP	2022		
Dr. Barugahare Charles	2018	Former University Secretary, Makerere University	

== See also ==
- Uganda Independence Medal
