= Bridgman Award =

Award for research in high pressure science

The Bridgman Award is a prize given every two years by the International Association for the Advancement of High Pressure Science and Technology (AIRAPT) for research in the physics, chemistry, or technology of high pressure science. The award is named in honor of Percy Williams Bridgman, Nobel Prize winner and famous pioneer of the physics of high pressure.

== Recipients ==
- 1977 Harry George Drickamer
- 1979 Boris Vodar, France
- 1981 E. Ulrich Franck (1920–2004), professor for physical chemistry at the University of Karlsruhe
- 1983 Albert Francis Birch (1903–1992), geophysicist and mineralogist, professor at Harvard University
- 1985 Nestor Joseph Trappeniers (1922–2004), professor in Amsterdam
- 1987 Francis P. Bundy (1910–2008), diamond synthesis under high pressure in 1954 at General Electric
- 1989 Ho-kwang Mao, Carnegie Institution, Washington D.C.
- 1991 Shigeru Minomura (1923–2000), professor at the Institute for Condensed Matter Research in Tokyo, later in Hokkaido and at Okayama University
- 1993 Arthur L. Ruoff, professor at Cornell University
- 1995 Bogdan Baranowski (1927–2014), professor of physical chemistry in Warsaw
- 1997 William A. Bassett (born 1931), professor of geology at Cornell University
- 1999 Vladimir Fortov
- 2001 William J. Nellis
- 2003 Neil Ashcroft
- 2005 Sergei Mikhailovich Stishov, professor and direct of the Institute of High Pressure Physics of the Russian Academy of Sciences
- 2007 Takehiko Yagi, professor at the Institute of Condensed Matter Physics, University of Tokyo
- 2009 Russell J. Hemley, director of the Geophysical Laboratory, Carnegie Institution, Washington D.C.
- 2011 Eji Ito, emeritus professor at Okayama University
- 2013 Karl Syassen
- 2015 Paul Loubeyre
- 2017 Mikhail Eremets
- 2019 Gilbert Collins
- 2021 Tetsuo Irifune
- 2025 Renata Wentzcovitch
