= Ibrokhim Abdurakhmonov =

Uzbek statesman and scientist

Ibrokhim Yulchiyevich Abdurakhmonov
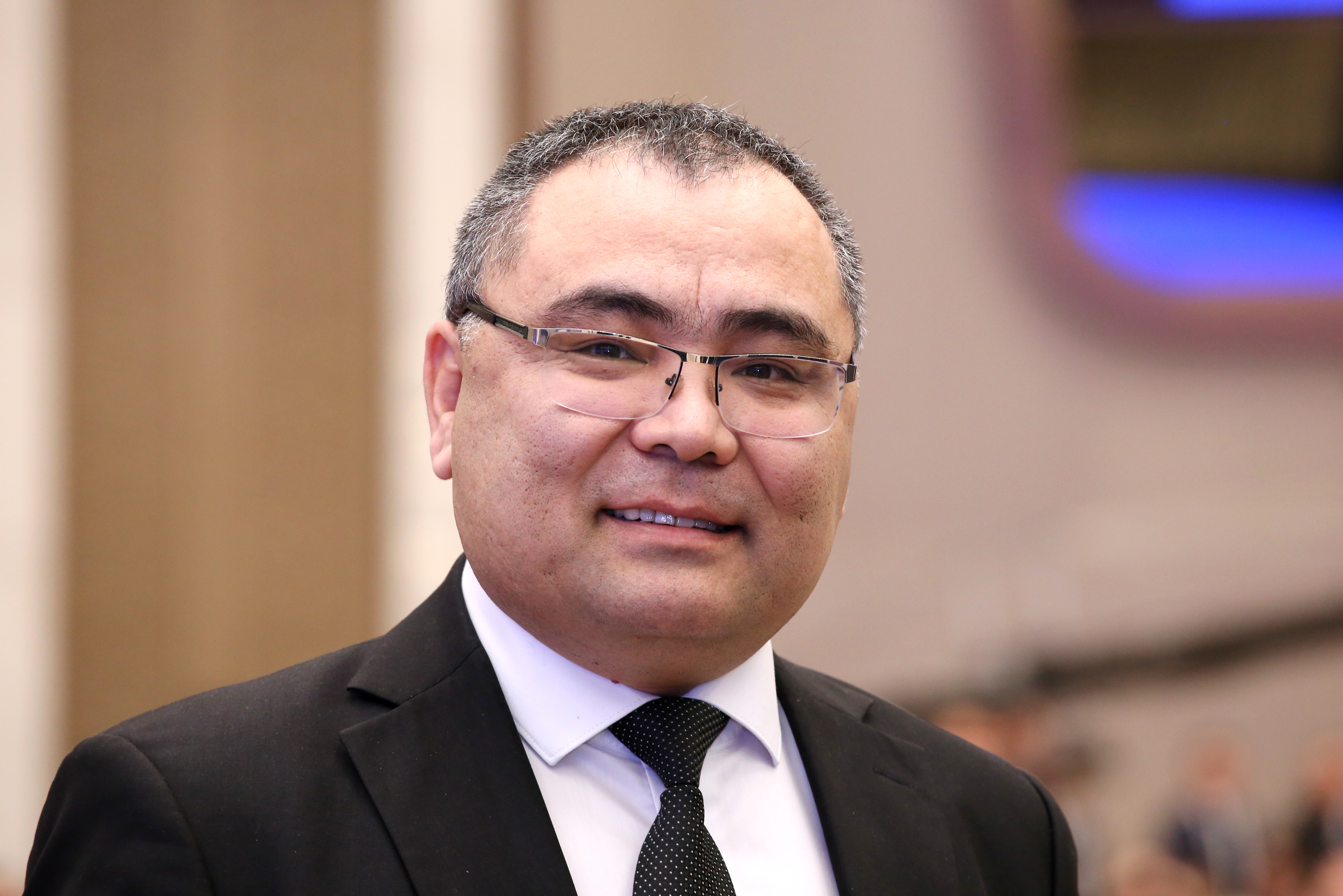

Minister of Agriculture of the Republic of Uzbekistan
- Incumbent
- Assumed office 19 November 2017
- President: Shavkat Mirziyoyev

Personal details
- Born: 19 February 1975 (age 51) Chust District, Namangan Region, Uzbek SSR, USSR
- Education: National University of Uzbekistan

Ibrokhim Yulchiyevich Abdurakhmonov (Uzbek: Ibroxim Yulchiyevich Abduraxmonov; born 19 February 1975, Namangan Region, Uzbek SSR, USSR) is an Uzbek politician and scientist. In 2012, he founded the Center for Genomics and Bioinformatics of Academy of Sciences of Uzbekistan. He was the winner of the 2010 TWAS Prize and 2013 ICAC Researcher of the Year awards for outstanding contributions to cotton genomics and biotechnology. In 2017–2022, he served as Minister of Innovative Development of the Republic of Uzbekistan.

In 2022, he was awarded the title of Silk Road Friendship Ambassador of the China International Culture Exchange Center (CICEC) and Global People magazine. In 2023, he was appointed as the Minister of Higher Education, Science and Innovation of the Republic of Uzbekistan. Member of the Academy of Sciences of Uzbekistan and the World Academy of Sciences. He is the Minister of Agriculture of the Republic of Uzbekistan from October 2023.

== Biography ==
Abdurakhmonov was born on 19 February 1975 in the village of Govasoy, Chust district, Namangan Region. In 1997 he graduated from Tashkent State University (now the National University of Uzbekistan), receiving a bachelor's degree in biotechnology. Scholarship holder of the "Umid" Foundation. In 2001, he graduated from the Texas A&M University (US) with a Master of Science degree in plant breeding, after which he returned to Uzbekistan to continue his scientific activities.

In 2002, Abdurakhmonov defended his PhD thesis in the field of molecular genetics and took the position of senior researcher at the Institute of Genetics and Experimental Plant Biology of the Academy of Sciences of the Republic of Uzbekistan.

From 2002 to 2008, in collaboration with American scientists, he was engaged in research on cotton genomics. The result of these studies was the development of gene-knockout technology for obtaining high-quality, long-staple, high-yielding and early-ripening cotton varieties with a developed root system.

In 2008 he defended his doctoral thesis in the field of molecular genetics and received the degree of Doctor of Biological Sciences. In 2011 he was awarded the title of professor of molecular genetics and molecular biotechnology of the Academy of Sciences of Uzbekistan.

In 2012, Abdurakhmonov led the process of creating a new independent research center – the Center for Genomics and Bioinformatics at the Academy of Sciences of the Republic of Uzbekista, the Ministry of Agriculture and Water Resources, the ″Uzpakhtasanoat″ Association, and was appointed its head. In 2016, this center was considered the largest scientific institution of the Academy of Sciences of Uzbekistan.

26 October 2014 in Muscat (Oman) became a member of the World Academy of Sciences. In 2017 he was appointed Acting Vice President of the Academy of Sciences of the Republic of Uzbekistan.

On 29 November 2017, President of Uzbekistan Shavkat Mirziyoyev appointed Abdurakhmonov to the post of Minister of Innovative Development of the Republic of Uzbekistan.]

Under the leadership of Abdurakhmonov, the "Strategy for Innovative Development of the Republic of Uzbekistan for 2019 – 2021" and "Strategy for Innovative Development of the Republic of Uzbekistan for 2022–2026" were developed and subsequently approved by the Decree of the President of the Republic of Uzbekistan. By the Decree of the President of 7 July 2022, Abdurakhmonov was appointed Chairman of the Cotton Council.

At the end of 2022, the structure of the government was reorganized in Uzbekistan. By presidential decree, Abdurakhmonov was appointed to the position of Minister of Higher Education, Science and Innovation of the Republic of Uzbekistan. He has been working as the Minister of Agriculture of the Republic of Uzbekistan since October 24, 2023.

In 2026, he became a member of the Advisory Council of the AMENA Center for Entrepreneurship and Development at the University of California, Berkeley.

== Scientific activity ==
In collaboration with colleagues from the University of Texas and the US Department of Agriculture, Abdurakhmonov developed technologies for "turning off" cotton genes (RNA interference), as well as the practical application of this technology. With the help of this gene-knockout technology, high-quality, long-staple, high-yielding and early-ripening cotton varieties with a developed root system were obtained.

Managed such projects as: "Molecular mapping of fiber yield and quality genes by using the germplasm resources of the cotton plant of Uzbekistan", "Characterization and molecular mapping of phytochromes and flowering genes in cotton", "Molecular characterization and association of quantitative trait genes/loci for Fusarium wilt disease" and"Evaluation of potential resistance of cotton germplasm against gall nematode, Fusarium wilt disease and development of candidate gene markers".

Abdurakhmonov led the 3rd phase clinical trials of a new recombinant coronavirus Chinese-Uzbekistan (ZF-UZ-VAC2001) vaccine, which was approved for emergency use in Uzbekistan.

== Awards ==
- 2013 – "2013 ICAC Cotton Researcher of the Year" by the International Cotton Advisory Committee (ICAC) for contributions to cotton genomics and biotechnology.
- 2010 – TWAS Prize in Agricultural Sciences, for his fundamental contribution to understanding genetic diversity and its exploitation in the cotton genome.
- 2023 – Winner of the UNESCO-Equatorial Guinea International Prize for Research in the Life Sciences.
- 2023 – 8th VCANBIO Award for International Cooperation in Life Sciences and Medicine, for his contribution to the joint development of a COVID-19 vaccine.
- 2026 – Winner of the World Agriculture Prize in the Emerging and Developing Economies category, awarded by the Global Confederation of Higher Education Associations for Agricultural and Life Sciences (GCHERA).
- 2026 – Recognized as a Top Agri-Food Pioneer by the World Food Prize Foundation for cotton breeding in Uzbekistan.
