= UNESCO-Equatorial Guinea International Prize for Research in the Life Sciences =

The UNESCO-Equatorial Guinea International Prize for Research in the Life Sciences a scientific prize launched in 2012 by UNESCO to reward scientific research in the life sciences leading to improving the quality of human life.

== Laureates ==
Source: UNESCO

=== 2012 ===
- Maged Al-Sherbiny, Egypt
- Felix Dapare Dakora, South Africa
- Rossana Arroyo, Mexico

=== 2014 ===
- Hossein Baharvand (Iran)
- André Bationo (Burkina-Faso)
- Instituto de Medicina Tropical von Humboldt (IMT) at Universidad Peruana Cayetano Heredia

=== 2015 ===
- Manoel Barral-Netto (Brazil)
- Balram Bhargava (India)
- Amadou Alpha Sall (Senegal)

=== 2017 ===
- Agricultural Research Organisation at the Volcani Centre Israel
- Rui Luis Gonçalves dos Reis (Portugal)
- Ivan Antonio Izquierdo (Brazil)

=== 2019 ===
- Cato Laurencin (USA)
- Kevin McGuigan (Ireland)
- Youyou Tu (China)

=== 2022 ===
- Li Lanjuan (China)
- Chad Mirkin (USA)
- Christofer Toumazou (England)

=== 2023 ===
- Mosaad Attia Abdel-Wahhab (Egypt)
- Ibrokhim Abdurakhmonov (Uzbekistan)
- Almira Ramanaviciene (Lithuania)

=== 2024 ===
- Mohamed Ali Farag (Egypt)
- Jie Qiao (China)
- Triantafyllos Stylianopoulos (Cyprus)

=== 2025 ===
- Abderrezak Bouchama (Saudi Arabia)
- Rose Gana Fomba Leke (Cameroon)
- George Fu Gao (China)

== See also ==
- List of biology awards
