= Martin Bodo Plenio =

German physicist

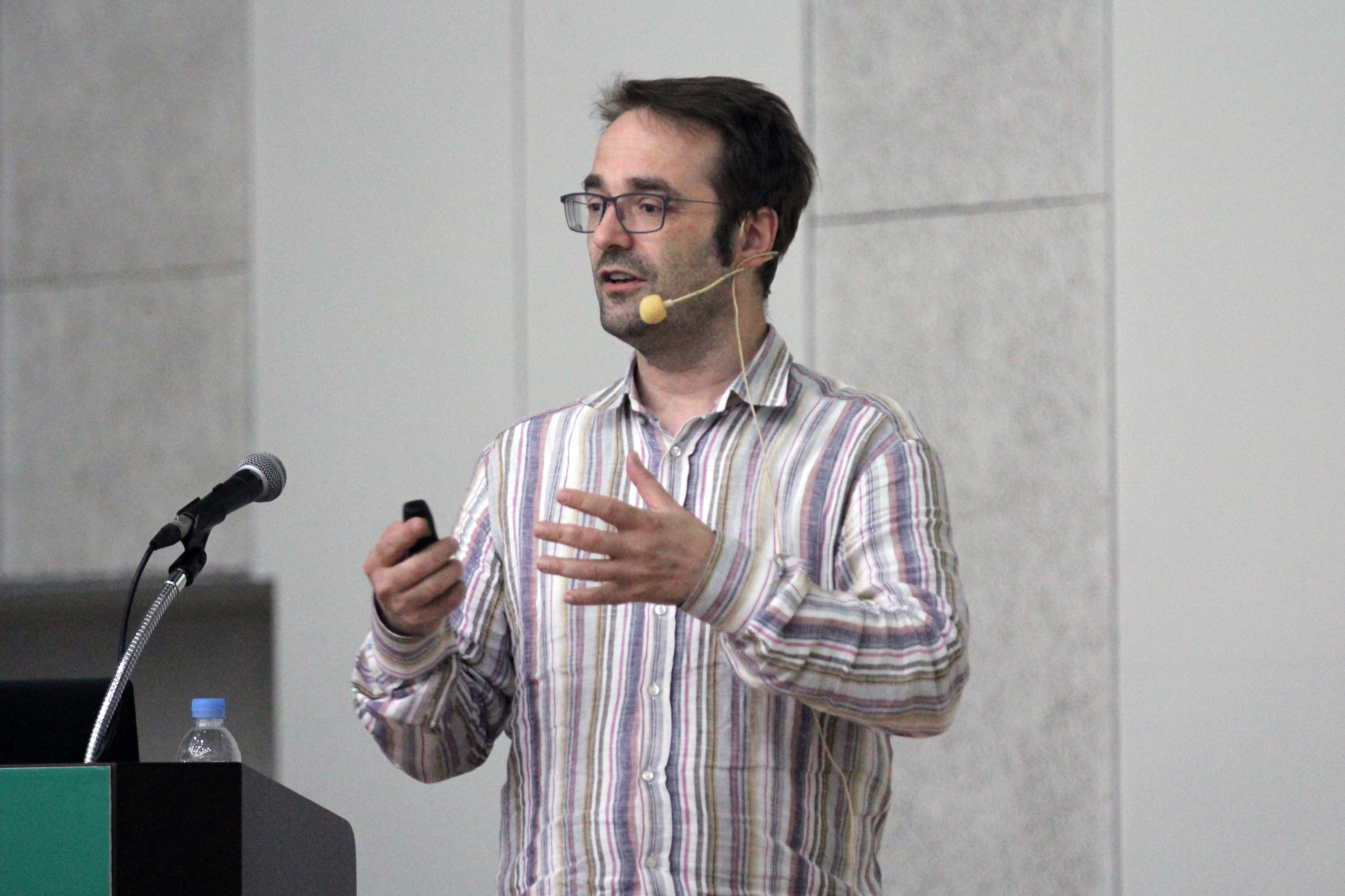
- Born: 20 May 1968 (age 58); Kassel
- Citizenship: German
- Education: Imperial College London; University of Göttingen
- Known for: Quantum information theory Quantum technology Quantum biology
- Awards: Maxwell Medal and Prize 2004, Clifford Paterson Lecture 2008, Alexander von Humboldt Foundation Humboldt Professor 2008, Max Born Prize 2012, ERC Synergy Grant 2012, ERC Synergy Grant 2019, Highly Cited Researcher; Kooperationspreis Wissenschaft-Wirtschaft 2025,
- Scientific career
- Fields: Physics
- Workplaces: Ulm University
- Doctoral advisor: Gerhard C. Hegerfeldt
- Doctoral students: Fernando Brandão; Vlatko Vedral
- Other notable students: Adolfo del Campo, Jens Eisert

Martin Bodo Plenio (born 20 May 1968) is a German physicist, Alexander von Humboldt Professor, and Director of the Institute for Theoretical Physics at Ulm University.

He is notable for his work on entanglement theory, quantum technology, hyperpolarisation methods and quantum biology.

== Education ==
He obtained his Diploma 1992 and Doctorate 1994 in physics from the University of Göttingen.

== Career ==
In 1995 – 1997, he was a Feodor Lynen Fellow at Imperial College London in the group of Prof. Sir. Peter Knight FRS. He was Lecturer (1998–2001), Senior Lecturer (2001–2003) and Full Professor (2003–2009) at Imperial College London. In 2009 he was awarded an Alexander von Humboldt Professorship of the Alexander von Humboldt Foundation and moved to Ulm University where he is Director of the Institute of Theoretical Physics and leads the Controlled Quantum Dynamics group. He held a part-time position at Imperial College London. He was awarded successive European Research Council Synergy in 2012 and in 2019. In 2016 he co-founded NVision Imaging Technologies a technology company that is leveraging advances in quantum physics to enable the first routine, convenient and affordable use of Magnetic Resonance Imaging for assessing early patient response to cancer treatment at the metabolic level. In 2021 he co-founded QC Design that is providing design automation software for the development of fault tolerant quantum computing devices.

In 2014 he was awarded €27Million for a research building to establish the Center for Quantum Biosciences of which he is the founding director. The center promotes research at the interface between quantum science and technology and the life sciences.
