= Nickel hydride =

Nickel hydride is either an inorganic compound of the formula NiH_{x} or any of a variety of coordination complexes. It was discovered by Polish chemist Bogdan Baranowski in 1958.

== Binary nickel hydrides and related materials ==
"The existence of definite hydrides of nickel and platinum is in doubt". This observation does not preclude the existence of nonstoichiometric hydrides. Indeed, nickel is a widely used hydrogenation catalyst. Experimental studies on nickel hydrides are rare and principally theoretical.

Hydrogen hardens nickel (as it does most metals), inhibiting dislocations in the nickel atom crystal lattice from sliding past one another. Varying the amount of alloying hydrogen and the form of its presence in the nickel hydride (precipitated phase) controls qualities such as the hardness, ductility, and tensile strength of the resulting nickel hydride. Nickel hydride with increased hydrogen content can be made harder and stronger than nickel, but such nickel hydride is also less ductile than nickel. Loss of ductility occurs due to cracks maintaining sharp points due to suppression of elastic deformation by the hydrogen, and voids forming under tension due to decomposition of the hydride. Hydrogen embrittlement can be a problem in nickel in use in turbines at high temperatures.

In the narrow range of stoichiometries adopted by nickel hydride, distinct structures are claimed. At room temperature, the most stable form of nickel is the face-centred cubic (FCC) structure α-nickel. It is a relatively soft metallic material that can dissolve only a very small concentration of hydrogen, no more than 0.002 wt% at 1,455 °C (2,651 °F), and only 0.00005% at 25 °C (77 °F). The solid solution phase with dissolved hydrogen, that maintains the same structure as the original nickel is termed the α-phase. At 25°C, 6 kbar of hydrogen pressure is needed to dissolve in β-nickel, but the hydrogen desorbs at pressures below 3.4 kbar.

=== Surface ===
Hydrogen dissociates on nickel surfaces. The dissociation energies on Ni(111), Ni(100), and Ni(110) crystal faces are respectively 46, 52, and 36 kJ/mol. The H_{2} dissociates from each of these surfaces at distinct temperatures: 320–380, 220–360, and 230–430 K.

=== High pressure phases ===
Crystallographically distinct phases of nickel hydride are produced with hydrogen gas at 600 MPa; or electrolytically. The crystal form is face-centred cubic or β-nickel hydride. Hydrogen to nickel atomic ratios are up to one, with hydrogen occupying an octahedral site. The density of the β-hydride is 7.74 g/cm^{3}. It is grey. At a current density of 1 amp per square decimeter, in 0.5 mol/liter of sulfuric acid and thiourea a surface layer of nickel will be converted to nickel hydride. This surface is replete with cracks up to millimeters long. The direction of cracking is in the {001} plane of the original nickel crystals. The lattice constant of nickel hydride is 3.731 Å, which is 5.7% more than that of nickel.

The near-stoichiometric NiH is unstable and loses hydrogen at pressures below 340 MPa.

== Molecular nickel hydrides ==
A large number of nickel hydride complexes are known. Illustrative is the complex trans-NiH(Cl)(P(C_{6}H_{11})_{3})_{2}.

== See also ==
- Solid solution
- Lattice energy
