= Renata Wentzcovitch =

Brazilian condensed matter physicist

Renata M. M. Wentzcovitch
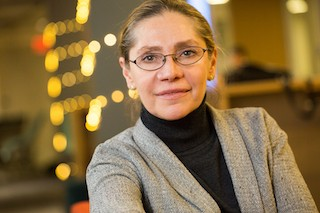
- Education: University of California, Berkeley
- Scientific career
- Fields: Materials science Condensed matter physics Chemistry; Geosciences
- Workplaces: Columbia University; Lamont Doherty Earth Observatory
- Website: Vlab

Renata Maria Mattosinho Wentzcovitch is a Brazilian/Italian American physicist. She was born in Campinas (SP) and grew up in the ABC region on the outskirts of São Paulo, Brazil. She is a faculty member of the Department of Applied Physics and Applied Mathematics and the Department of Earth and Environmental Sciences at Columbia University. She is also a senior staff scientist at the Lamont Doherty Earth Observatory, Columbia University. Before joining the Columbia University faculty, she worked for the University of Minnesota. She was a faculty member in the Department of Chemical Engineering and Materials Science and a member of the graduate faculties in the Department of Physics and Astronomy, Department of Earth and Environmental Sciences, Chemical Physics Program, and Computational Science Program. Her research focuses on developing and applying materials simulation methods at extreme pressure and temperature conditions, especially planet-forming materials. She is currently President of the Mineral and Rock Physics Section of the American Geophysical Union.

== Education ==
She holds B.Sc. and M.Sc. degrees in Physics from the University of São Paulo in Brazil and a Ph.D in Condensed Matter Physics from UC-Berkeley, where she worked under the supervision of Marvin L. Cohen. She was a post-doctoral associate jointly at Brookhaven National Laboratory and the Physics Department at Stony Brook University from 1989-1992, a post-doctoral associate at the Theory of Condensed Matter Group at the Cavendish Laboratory, Cambridge University, UK, from 1992-1993, and a Research Fellow at the Department of Geological Sciences, University College London, and the Royal Institution of Great Britain, London, UK (1993-94).

== Research ==
Wentzcovitch and her group research materials properties at extreme conditions of planetary interiors primarily for geophysics and planetary science applications. Some of her early ab initio molecular dynamics simulation methods have been implemented in the Quantum ESPRESSO package. She pioneered ab initio calculations of thermodynamic properties at extreme conditions using the quasi-harmonic approximation, which is essential for their applications in mineral physics and geophysics. She was the founding director of the Virtual Laboratory for Earth and Planetary Materials (2004), a cyberinfrastructure for high-throughput computations of mineral properties at extreme conditions. In particular, the calculations of materials' thermoelastic properties and acoustic velocities are used to interpret seismic tomographic images. She collaborates closely with seismologists, geodynamicists, and geochemists to investigate Earth’s and other planet’s internal structure and dynamics.

== Awards and honors ==
- American Geophysical Union College of Fellows Distinguished Lecturer (2026-27)
- PIFI Distinguished Scientist of the Chinese Academy of Sciences (2026)
- 2025 Bridgman Award of the International Association for the Advancement of High Pressure Science and Technology (AIRAPT)
- President-Elect (2023-24), President (2025-26), Past-President (2027-2028), Mineral and Rock Physics Section, American Geophysical Union
- Vice-Chair, Chair-Elect, Chair, Past-Chair, Division of Computational Physics, American Physical Society (2017-20)
- Wilhelm Heraeus Visiting Professorship Award, Goethe University of Frankfurt (2015-16)
- Member, American Academy of Arts and Sciences (2013-)
- Fellow, American Association for Advancement of Science (Physics) (2012-)
- Fellow, Mineralogical Society of America (2009-)
- Fellow, American Geophysical Union (2008-)
- Fellow, American Physical Society, Division of Materials Physics (2006-)
- Alexander von Humboldt Research Award for Senior US Scientists (2008)
- Japan Society for the Promotion of Science (JSPS), Invitation Fellowship for Research in Japan (2008)
- Shell Land-Grant Professor in Chemical Engineering and Material Science, University of Minnesota (1994-95)
- Honorary Research Fellow, Birkbeck College, University of London, UK (1993-94)
