= Fernando Brandão =

Brazilian physicist

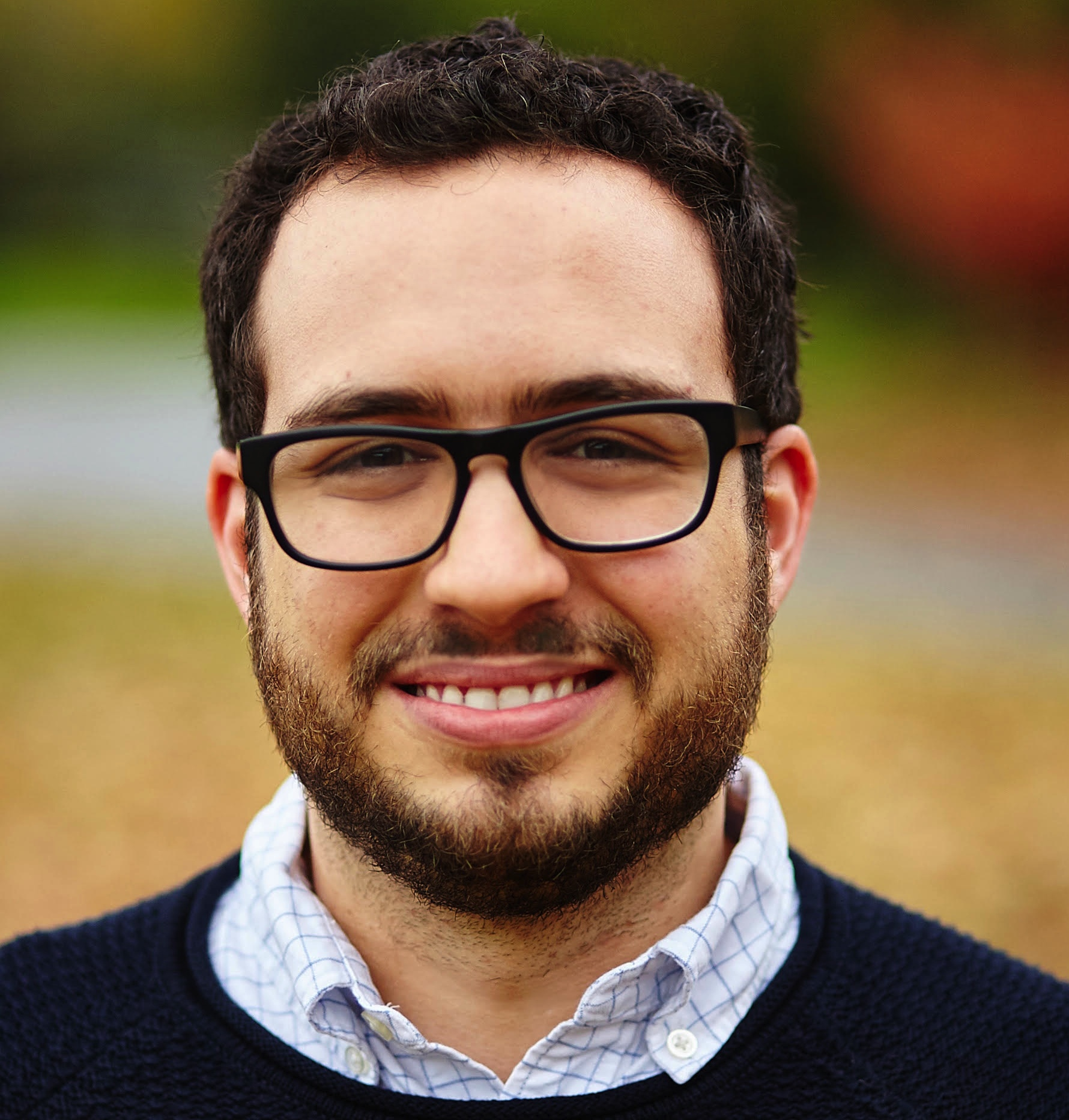
- Brandão in 2015
- Born: 22 January 1983 (age 43); Belo Horizonte, Brazil
- Scientific career
- Fields: Physics, computer science, mathematics
- Institutions: California Institute of Technology
- Doctoral advisor: Martin Bodo Plenio

Fernando Brandão (born 22 January 1983) is a Brazilian physicist and computer scientist working on quantum information and quantum computation. He is currently the Bren Professor of Theoretical Physics at the California Institute of Technology and Director of Quantum Applications at Amazon Web Services. Previously, he was a researcher at Microsoft and a reader in Computer Science at University College London.

He is an editor of the journal Physics Reports. He was awarded the 2013 European Quantum Information Young Investigator Award for "his highly appraised achievements in entanglement theory, quantum complexity theory, and quantum many-body physics, which combine dazzling mathematical ability and impressive physical insight". He was awarded the 2020 American Physical Society Rolf Landauer and Charles H. Bennett award for his contributions to entanglement theory.
