= Ho-Kwang Mao =

Chinese-American geologist

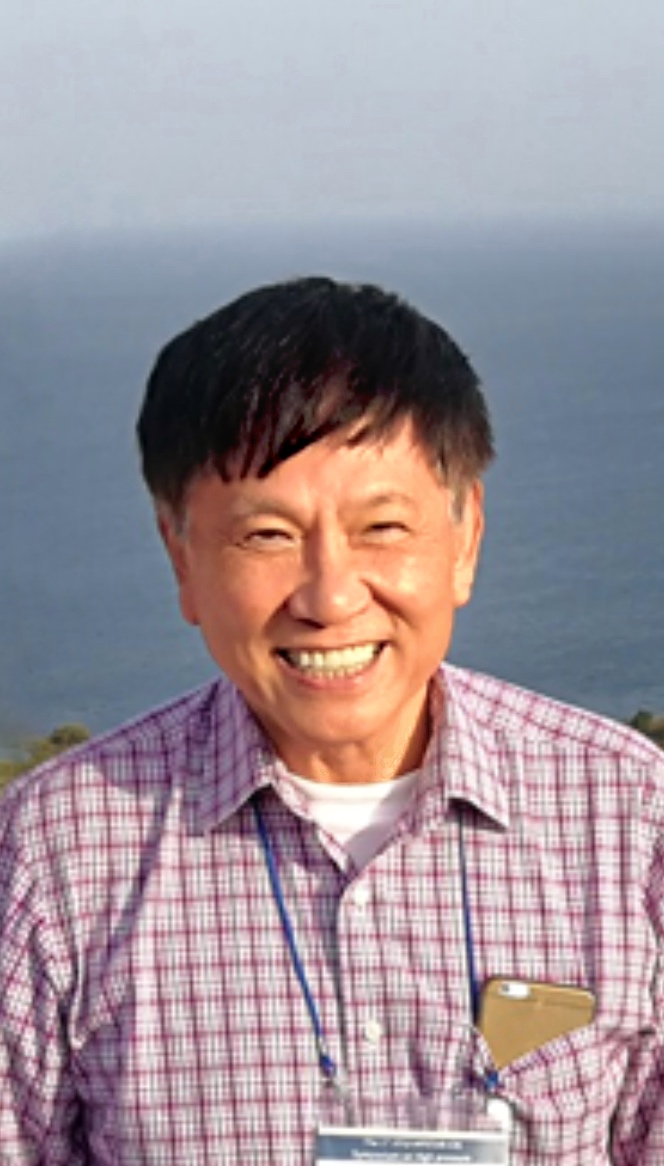
- Born: June 18, 1941 (age 85); Shanghai, China
- Education: National Taiwan University (BS); University of Rochester (MS, PhD)
- Known for: High Pressure techniques, X-ray sciences
- Spouse: Agnes Mao
- Awards: Inge Lehmann Medal (2007) Balzan Prize (2005); Gregori Aminoff Prize (2005); Roebling Medal (2005); Arthur L. Day Prize (1990); P. W. Bridgman Award (1989) Mineralogical Society of America Award (1979)
- Scientific career
- Fields: Geology, Material Sciences
- Workplaces: Carnegie Institution of Washington
- Doctoral advisor: Bill Bassett and Taro Takahashi
- Website: https://sites.google.com/carnegiescience.edu/ho-kwangmao/cv

Ho-Kwang (Dave) Mao (Chinese: 毛河光; pinyin: Máo Héguāng; Wade–Giles: Mao Ho-kuang; born June 18, 1941) is a Chinese-American geologist. He is the director of the Center for High Pressure Science and Technology Advanced Research in Shanghai, China. He was a staff scientist at Geophysical Laboratory of the Carnegie Institution for Science for more than 30 years. Mao is a recognized leading scientist in high pressure geosciences and physical science. There are two minerals named after him, Davemaoite and Maohokite.

== Biography ==
Mao was born in Shanghai in 1941. His father, General Mao Sen (毛森), was a high-ranking official of the intelligence department of the Republic of China. When Mao was seven years old, he moved to Taiwan with his family, fleeing with the rest of the government of the Republic of China to the province. Mao received his BS from National Taiwan University in 1963. Mao further pursued his studies in the United States, and obtained MS in 1966 and PhD in 1968 from the University of Rochester, New York.

From 1968 to 1972, Mao did his postdoctoral research at the Geophysical Laboratory of the Carnegie Institution of Washington (CIW). From then on Mao has spent his career at Geophysical Laboratory as a senior staff scientist.

In 2013, Mao founded Center for High Pressure Science and Technology Advanced Research in his birthplace, Shanghai. He takes the director role at the center and leads a group of international scientists to tackle world-class scientific challenges. The center has a Nature index of 17.68 in 2021 and was on an increasing trend since 2016.

Mao has three daughters - Cyndy, Linda, and Wendy. His youngest daughter, Wendy Mao, is a professor of geological sciences at Stanford University.

== Research ==
=== Achieving high pressure and pressure calibration methods ===
Mao is one of the most prolific users of the diamond anvil cell for research at high pressures. Although at the time the claim was controversial, his work with Peter M. Bell is now generally accepted as being the first verified static pressure in excess of 1 Megabar.

Mao and colleagues first calibrated ruby fluorescence pressure scale to 80 GPa and this method has been widely used in almost every diamond anvil cell experiments. This work has been cited by 3921 times as of Jan 15, 2022, according to google scholar.

In 2018, 400 GPa was achieved by his team and a detailed description of pressure loading and distribution, gasket thickness variation, and diamond anvil deformation was reported.

=== Towards metallic hydrogen ===
Mao is a pioneer in experimentally exploring the possible metallic hydrogen phase under high pressure. His work on solid hydrogen starts in 1988, where he reported single-crystal structure of hydrogen up to 26.5 GPa. He later published a review paper on transitions in solid hydrogen in 1994. In 1996, his team's work suggested a more compressible solid hydrogen than previously thought. More recently in 2019, his team published results on single crystal diffraction of the lightest material in the world, hydrogen, up to 254 GPa and revealed isostructural electronic transitions in solid hydrogen at around 220 GPa.

=== Superconductivity ===
In 1987, Mao and a colleague at the Geophysical Laboratory, Robert Hazen, identified the composition and structure of the first high-temperature superconductor to have a critical temperature above the boiling point of liquid nitrogen.

=== Iron peroxide in Earth's interior ===
Mao discovered formation of FeO_{2}H_{x} from goethite FeOOH or from iron-water reaction under Earth's lower mantle conditions. The novel FeO_{2}H_{x} phase processes a pyrite structure. Since this phase can contain varied amount of hydrogen, it would have important implications for the deep water cycle.

== Honors and awards ==
- 1979, Fellow of the Mineralogical Society of America
- 1979, the Mineralogical Society of America Award
- 1987, Fellow of the American Geophysical Union
- 1989, the P. W. Bridgman Award, from the AIRAPT International
- 1990, the Arthur L. Day Prize, from the United States National Academy of Sciences
- 1993, Member of the United States National Academy of Sciences
- 1994, Academician of the Academia Sinica, Taiwan
- 1994, Fellow of the American Physical Society
- 1996, Foreign Member of the Chinese Academy of Sciences
- 1996, Fellow of the Geochemical Society
- 2002, Chinese government Friendship Award
- 2005, the Balzan Prize for Mineral Physics (with Russell J. Hemley)
- 2005, the Gregori Aminoff Prize, from the Royal Swedish Academy of Sciences
- 2005, the Roebling Medal, from the Mineralogical Society of America
- 2007, the Inge Lehmann Medal, from the American Geophysical Union
- 2008, Foreign Fellow of the Royal Society of London
- In 2021, davemaoite, a mineral found only in the deep mantle of the earth, was named after Mao. It is estimated to make 5–7% of the Earth's lower mantle.
