= Russell J. Hemley =

American geophysicist and physical chemist

Russell Julian Hemley (26 October 1954, Berkeley, California) is an American geophysicist, solid-state physicist, and physical chemist. Hemley is especially notable for his work in the theoretical prediction and experimental observation of near room-temperature superconductivity in lanthanum decahydride under high pressure.

Hemley grew up in California, Colorado and Utah. He studied chemistry and philosophy at Wesleyan University with bachelor's degree in 1977 and then physical chemistry at Harvard University with master's degree in 1980 and Ph.D. in 1983. As a postdoc he was at Harvard University and was from 1984 to 1987 a Carnegie fellow at the Geophysical Laboratory of the Carnegie Institution in Washington D.C. From 1987 to 2016 he was a staff member of the Geophysical Laboratory, where he was from 2007 to 2013 the director.

In the academic year 1991–1992 he was a visiting scientist at the Johns Hopkins University and in 1996 and again in 1999 at the École normale supérieure de Lyon.

Hemley's research deals with the properties of matter under high pressure with applications in geophysics, geochemistry and planetology, as well as applications in solid-state physics, chemistry, and pressure effects on biomolecules and biological systems; the applications in physics include hydrogen under pressure in the megabar range, generation of novel superconductors, magnetic structures, glasses and superhard materials under high pressure; the applications in chemistry include new compounds under high pressure. Hemley's research has been experimental (e.g. high-pressure studies with spectroscopic methods and generating high pressures with laser-heated diamond anvil cell) and theoretical; he used theory to develop high-pressure experimental methods in conjunction with microscopic laser-optical and X-ray diffraction analysis in situ from synchrotron radiation sources. Hemley worked in the late 1980s with Ho-Kwang Mao, who became famous for his 1976 work with Peter M. Bell on extension of the laboratory pressure range up to pressures over 1 megabar. Hemley, Mao, and Bell investigated not only minerals under pressures corresponding to those in the Earth's interior but also gases and liquids under pressures believed to exist in the interiors of gas giants such as Jupiter and Saturn. In particular, they investigated the behavior of hydrogen at pressures in the megabar range.

Hemley has published over 680 articles as an author or co-author and has been awarded several patents.

== Awards and honors ==
- Fellow, American Physical Society, 1996
- Fellow, American Academy of Arts and Sciences, 1997
- Fellow, American Geophysical Union, 1997
- Member, National Academy of Sciences, 2001
- Balzan Prize for Mineral Physics, shared with Ho-Kwang Mao, 2005
- Bridgman Award, 2009
- Corresponding Fellow of the Royal Society of Edinburgh, 2008
- Honoris Causa Professor of the Russian Academy of Sciences, 2008
- Mineral Hemleyite named, 2017
