= Wendy Mao =

Chinese American geologist

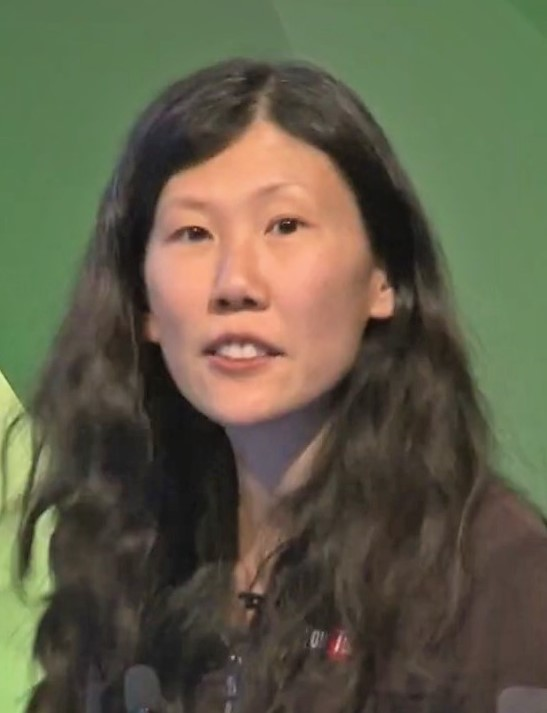
- Mao in 2019
- Born: Washington, D.C.
- Education: University of Chicago; Massachusetts Institute of Technology
- Scientific career
- Workplaces: Stanford University; Los Alamos National Laboratory
- Thesis: Geophysics and geochemistry of iron in the earth's core (2005)

Wendy Li-Wen Mao is an American geologist who is a professor at SLAC National Accelerator Laboratory. Her research considers the mineral physics of planetary interiors, new materials under extreme environments and novel characterisation techniques. In 2021 she was elected Fellow of the European Association of Geochemistry.

== Early life and education ==
Mao is a second generation Chinese American, born to Agnes Mao and Ho-Kwang Mao. She grew up in Washington, D.C. Mao attended the Massachusetts Institute of Technology (MIT), where she specialized in materials science and engineering. Whilst at MIT, Mao was inducted into the Phi Beta Kappa society. She moved to the University of Chicago as a graduate student, where she studied the geochemistry of iron in the core of the Earth.

== Research and career ==
Mao joined the faculty at Stanford University in 2007. She was made Professor of Geological Science at Stanford. Her research considers the study of extreme environments in an effort to design more efficient materials for energy generation and storage.

In 2015, Mao found evidence that life existed on earth 4.1 billion years ago, which indicates that it survived the well-documented bombardment of the inner solar system that formed the craters in the moon. She made use of X-ray imaging to study zircons, durable minerals that form from molten rocks and preserve information about their immediate environments for hundreds of thousands of years. Beyond zircons, Mao has used the X-ray laser and X-ray free-electron lasers at SLAC to study the formation of ice, and how the process depends on pressure and temperature.

Mao has combined her training in materials science with her interest in geology to design light, strong metal alloys. These alloys are produced at high pressures and contain hexagonally closed packed structures, which result in extraordinarily high entropy alloys. Before the work of Mao, it was generally accepted that metals would not form hexagonal close packed structures because of the strong magnetic interactions between metal atoms. She showed that use of high pressure disrupts these interactions, and that the hexagonal close packed structures persisted even when the pressure was removed. Mao used high pressure, high temperature chambers to form stable phases of perovskites. Perovskites exist in several phases, with the so-called black phases demonstrating impressive solar cell performance. Mao showed that by compressing the yellow phases of perovskites in a diamond anvil cell, heating the crystals to 450 °C and slow cooling to room temperature it is possible to form a stable version of the black phase.

== Awards and honors ==
- 2008 Stanford University Consortium for Materials Properties Research in Earth Sciences Distinguished Lecturer
- 2013 Mineralogical Society of America Award
- 2021 Elected Fellow of the European Association of Geochemistry
- 2021 Elected Fellow of the American Geophysical Union

== Selected publications ==
- Wendy L Mao; Ho-Kwang Mao; Alexander F Goncharov; et al. (1 September 2002). "Hydrogen clusters in clathrate hydrate". Science. 297 (5590): 2247–2249. doi:10.1126/science.1075394. ISSN 0036-8075. PMID 12351785. Wikidata Q34152111.
- Wendy L Mao; Ho-Kwang Mao; Peter J Eng; et al. (1 October 2003). "Bonding changes in compressed superhard graphite". Science. 302 (5644): 425–427. doi:10.1126/science.1089713. ISSN 0036-8075. PMID 14564003. Wikidata Q79176477.
- Wendy L Mao; Ho-Kwang Mao (7 January 2004). "Hydrogen storage in molecular compounds". Proceedings of the National Academy of Sciences of the United States of America. 101 (3): 708–710. Bibcode:2004PNAS..101..708M. doi:10.1073/pnas.0307449100. ISSN 0027-8424. PMC 321744. PMID 14711993. Wikidata Q35553739.
