= Harry George Drickamer =

American chemist

- Born: November 19, 1918; Cleveland, Ohio, U.S.
- Died: May 6, 2002 (aged 83); Urbana, Illinois, U.S.
- Education: Indiana University; University of Michigan
- Known for: condensed matter physics
- Awards: Oliver E. Buckley Condensed Matter Prize (1967); Irving Langmuir Award (1974); Peter Debye Award (1987); Elliott Cresson Medal (1988); National Medal of Science (1989)
- Scientific career
- Fields: Chemical engineering
- Workplaces: University of Illinois at Urbana-Champaign

Harry George Drickamer (November 19, 1918 – May 6, 2002), born Harold George Weidenthal, was a pioneer experimentalist in high-pressure studies of condensed matter. His work generally concerned understanding the electronic properties of matter.

Drickamer was born in Cleveland, Ohio, to Louise Weidenthal and Harold Weidenthal. His father died when Harry was very young, and after his mother remarried, Harry's stepfather adopted him. After graduating early from public schools in East Cleveland, he played minor league professional baseball in the Cleveland Indians farm system, then entered Vanderbilt University on a football scholarship. He soon transferred to Indiana University and then to the University of Michigan, where he received a B.S. in chemical engineering in 1941 and master's degree one year later.

In 1942 Drickamer began work at the Pan American Refinery in Texas City, Texas. After his fellow students played a prank by forging his name on a sign-up sheet for the Ph.D. qualifying exam in chemical engineering, he decided to take the 16-hour exam. After he started work in Texas, he received word that he had passed. He then combined work with study of physics and quantum mechanics, and in February 1946 returned to the University of Michigan for one term to receive his Ph.D.

Drickamer joined the University of Illinois at Urbana-Champaign, where he subsequently remained for his entire professional career. After his initial appointment as an assistant professor of chemical engineering in 1946, he was promoted to associate professor in 1949 and to full professor in 1953. In 1958 he was appointed professor of chemical engineering and physical chemistry, and in 1983 he became professor of chemical engineering, chemistry, and physics.

== Honors and awards ==
- 1947 Coburn Award, American Institute of Chemical Engineers
- 1956 Ipatieff Prize, American Chemical Society
- 1962 Fellow of the American Physical Society
- 1965 Member of the National Academy of Sciences
- 1967 Oliver E. Buckley Solid-State Physics Award, American Physical Society
- 1967 Alpha Chi Sigma Award, American Institute of Chemical Engineers
- 1968 Victor Bendix Award, American Society for Engineering Education
- 1970 Fellow of the American Academy of Arts and Sciences
- 1972 William H. Walker Award, American Institute of Chemical Engineers
- 1974 Irving Langmuir Award in Chemical Physics, American Chemical Society
- 1977 P. W. Bridgman Award, International Association for the Advancement of High Pressure Science and Technology
- 1978 Michelson-Morley Award, Case Western Reserve University
- 1979 Member of the National Academy of Engineering
- 1983 Member of the American Philosophical Society
- 1983 Chemical Pioneer Award, American Institute of Chemists
- 1984 John Scott Award, City of Philadelphia
- 1985 Outstanding Materials Chemistry, U.S. Department of Energy
- 1986 Alexander von Humboldt Award, Federal Republic of Germany
- 1987 Robert A. Welch Prize in Chemistry
- 1987 Peter Debye Award in Physical Chemistry, American Chemical Society.
- 1989 He was awarded the National Medal of Science by President George H. W. Bush on October 18, 1989.
- 1989 Elliott Cresson Medal, Franklin Institute

== Legacy ==
Drickamer died of stroke on May 6, 2002, in Urbana. In honor of his outstanding achievements and hard work, one graduate student every year at Illinois from either Chemical and Biomolecular Engineering, Chemistry, or Physics will be awarded the Harry G. Drickamer Research Fellowship via the Drickamer Fund.

Harry is the father of esteemed biochemist Kurt Drickamer, currently a professor at Imperial College London, discoverer of C-type Lectins. His other son, Lee C. Drickamer is a well-known animal behaviorist and textbook author who received the 2010 Distinguished Animal Behaviorist Award from the Animal Behavior Society. Now retired as Regents' Professor Emeritus, he spent his academic career at Williams College, Southern Illinois University, and Northern Arizona University.
