= Susana F. Huelga =

Spanish physicist

- Born: Mieres
- Education: Universidad de Oviedo
- Known for: Quantum physics
- Scientific career
- Fields: Physics
- Workplaces: Ulm University
- Thesis: Optical experiments for the study of fundamental quantum properties
- Doctoral advisor: Emilio Santos

Susana F. Huelga is a Spanish physicist, and Professor at the Institute of Theoretical Physics of Ulm University.

She is notable for her contributions to the field of quantum information theory. These include quantum metrology in the presence of Markovian and non-Markovian environments, the theory of open quantum systems, numerical methods for their description in the presence of structured environments, the characterization, quantification and detection of non-Markovianity and fundamental contributions to quantum effects in biological systems.

== Education ==
She obtained her MSc in 1990 and her Doctorate in 1995 in physics from the Universidad de Oviedo, where she worked with Miguel Ferrero and Emilio Santos. Her thesis, Optical experiments for the study of fundamental quantum properties consisted of two parts, each proposing an optical experiment. The first part is a proposal for an experiment to test "Bell's inequality capable of closing the existing exits in the atomic cascade experiments already carried out". The second part is a proposal for the contrast of the Leggett–Garg inequality in an experiment.

== Career ==
After finishing her doctorate she spent a postdoc at the Clarendon Laboratory of Oxford University 1996 - 1997 and held a position as Profesor Titular at Universidad de Oviedo. She joined the Faculty of the Department of Physics, Astronomy and Mathematics of the University of Hertfordshire as a Lecturer in 2000 and Reader in 2008. In October 2009 she accepted a Professorship at the Institute of Theoretical Physics of the Universität Ulm where she is still working.

== Personal ==
She is married to physicist Martin Bodo Plenio.
