= Barbara Grzybowska-Świerkosz =

Polish chemist

Barbara Grzybowska-Świerkosz (born 1937), is a Polish chemist. She graduated from the Faculty of Mathematics, Physics and Chemistry of the Jagiellonian University in Kraków in 1959, and received a PhD from the Department of Chemistry at the University of Edinburgh in 1963. After completing a post-doctoral degree at the Institute of Physical Chemistry of the Polish Academy of Sciences in Warsaw in 1974, she researched and taught at that institution, where she has been a professor of chemical sciences since 1990. She has authored more than 140 publications, including articles, monographs and teaching documents.

Her scientific achievements have been recognized with multiple awards, and she has been a member or leader of professional groups including the Academy of Sciences of the Comecon Countries, the Coordinating Committee of Research on Catalysis of the Polish Academy of Sciences, EUROCAT-oxides, and the European Commission Action COST-15 "Interfacial Chemistry and Catalysis". She also served on the editorial boards of the journals Applied Catalysis (1991–1993) and the Polish Journal of Chemistry (1997–).

== Awards ==
- Order of Polonia Restituta (2018)
- Medal Jana Zawidzkiego (1997)
- Golden Cross of Merit (Poland) (1990)

== Publications ==
- Au/MCr2O4 (M = Co, Mn, Fe) catalysts in the oxidations of CO, C2, and C3 hydrocarbons (Reaction Kinetics, Mechanisms and Catalysis, 2012, v105, pp69–78).
- Oxidation of CO and propane on Pt-Au/Al2O3 catalysts (Polish Journal of Chemistry, 2008, v82, pp1991-1997).
- Oxidative Dehydrogenation of Isobutane on VOx/oxide Support Catalysts: Effect of the Potassium Additive (Polish Journal of Chemistry, 2007, v81, pp1345-1354).
- RNano-Au/oxide support catalysts in oxidation reactions: Provenance of active oxygen species (Catalysis today, 2006, v112, Issues 1–4, pp3-7).
- Effect of additives on the physicochemical and catalytic properties of oxide catalysts in selective oxidation reactions (Topics in catalysis, 2002, v21, pp35–46).
- 8 Catalysis (Royal Society of Chemistry Annual Reports Section "C" (Physical Chemistry), 2000, v96, pp297-334).
- Thirty years in selective oxidation on oxides: what have we learned? (Topics in Catalysis, 2000, v11, pp23–42).
- Active centres on vanadia-based catalysts for selective oxidation of hydrocarbons (Applied Catalysis A: General, 1997, v157, Issues 1–2, pp409-420).
