= Order of Katonga =

- Type: Single grade Order
- Awarded for: 'extraordinary heroism in the army'
- Presented by: Uganda
- Status: Currently constituted
- First award: 2004

Highlights
- Total: 2
- Total awarded posthumously: 1
- Ribbon bar

Precedence
- Next (higher): None
- Next (lower): Kabalega Star

The Order of Katonga (Swahili: Nishani ya Katonga) is the highest military decoration of the Ugandan Honours System. It is a very rare award that recognises its recipients for extraordinary heroism.

== History ==
The order is named after the final and decisive battle of the National Resistance Army during the Ugandan Bush War. It was fought near the Katonga River.

Ugandan President Yoweri Museveni decorated the Libyan leader Muammar Gaddafi on 6 April 2004 in Tripoli, honouring him for his contribution to the National Resistance Army (NRA) bush struggle that liberated Uganda from dictatorship, adding that Colonel Gaddafi has always been at the forefront of the liberation of Africa and unification of the continent.

Museveni also posthumously awarded former Tanzanian President Julius Nyerere in July 2007 at his hometown of Butiama for his assistance in liberating Africa from colonialism in general and Uganda from Idi Amin's rule in particular via the Uganda–Tanzania War. His wife Maria received the award on his behalf.

== Recipients ==
Name	Country	Title
Muammar Gaddafi	Libya	2nd Head of State of Libya
Yoweri Museveni	Uganda	9th President of Uganda
Julius Nyerere	Tanzania	1st President of Tanzania
Salim Saleh	Uganda	General of the UPDF
