= Shortcuts to adiabaticity =

Shortcuts to adiabaticity (STA) are fast control protocols to drive the dynamics of system without relying on the adiabatic theorem. The concept of STA was introduced in a 2010 paper by Xi Chen et al. Their design can be achieved using a variety of techniques. A universal approach is provided by counterdiabatic driving, also known as transitionless quantum driving. Motivated by one of authors systematic study of dissipative Landau-Zener transition, the key idea was demonstrated earlier by a group of scientists from China, Greece and USA in 2000, as steering an eigenstate to destination. Counterdiabatic driving has been demonstrated in the laboratory using a time-dependent quantum oscillator.

The use of counterdiabatic driving requires to diagonalize the system Hamiltonian, limiting its use in many-particle systems. In the control of trapped quantum fluids, the use of symmetries such as scale invariance and the associated conserved quantities has allowed to circumvent this requirement. STA have also found applications in finite-time quantum thermodynamics to suppress quantum friction. Fast nonadiabatic strokes of a quantum engine have been implemented using a three-dimensional interacting Fermi gas.

The use of STA has also been suggested to drive a quantum phase transition. In this context, the Kibble-Zurek mechanism predicts the formation of topological defects. While the implementation of counterdiabatic driving across a phase transition requires complex many-body interactions, feasible approximate controls can be found.

Outside of physics, STA have been applied to population genetics to derive a formalism to admit finite time control of the speed and trajectory in evolving populations, with an eye towards manipulating large populations of organisms causing human disease as an evolutionary therapy method, or toward more efficient directed evolution.
