= Alfred Świerkosz =

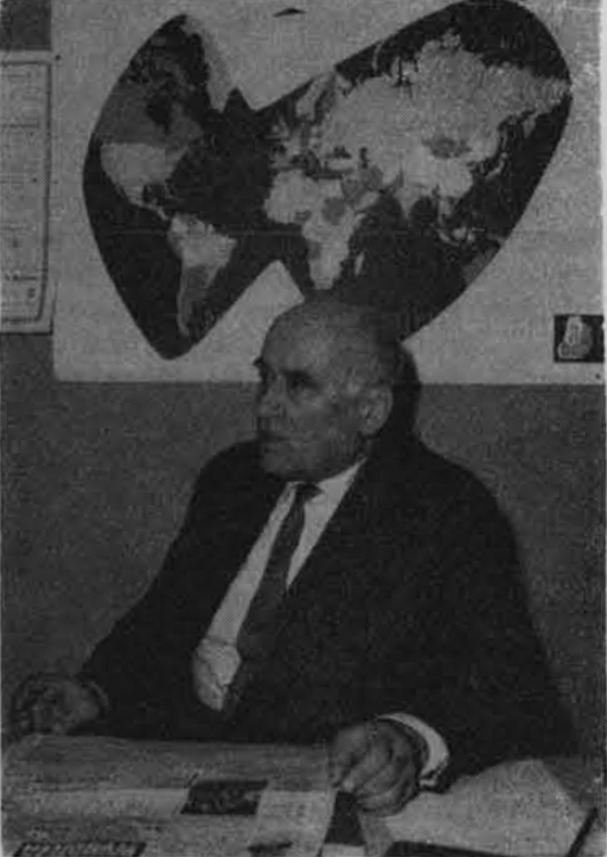
- Born: January 24, 1900; Lviv
- Died: March 23, 1968 (aged 68); Gdańsk
- Occupations: journalist, photographer

Alfred Juliusz Świerkosz (24 January 1900 – 23 March 1968) was a Polish journalist, photographer and an author of first monographs in Polish about cities of Pomerelia.

== Life ==
He was born in Lviv as a son of Tomasz (1863–1933) and Marie (1864–1920). From 1921 to 1927 he worked as a teacher in Puck. In 1929 he finished journalistic study in Kraków. During World War II he was fighting in the battle of Hel.

After the end of World War II he moved to Gdańsk where he was working in Polskie Radio and was writing articles for Głos Wybrzeża.

He had a wife called Maria. The couple had five children.

He died on 23 March 1968 at the age of 68. He's buried at Cmentarz Oliwski in Gdańsk.

== Publications ==
- Z Wybrzeża Polskiego. Puck. Zarys Monograficzny Z Ilustracjami (1930)
- Puck: najstarszy gród nad Zatoką Pucką (1934)
- Z Wybrzeża Polskiego: Brzegiem Międzymorza: Wielka Wieś, Chałupy, Kuźnica, Jastarnia, Bór, Jurata : zarys monograficzny osad Półwyspu Helskiego (1937)

== Awards ==
- Silver Cross of Merit
- Odznaka honorowa "Za zasługi dla miasta Gdańska"
- Odznaka honorowa "Zasłużony Pracownik Morza"
