= William J. Nellis =

American physicist

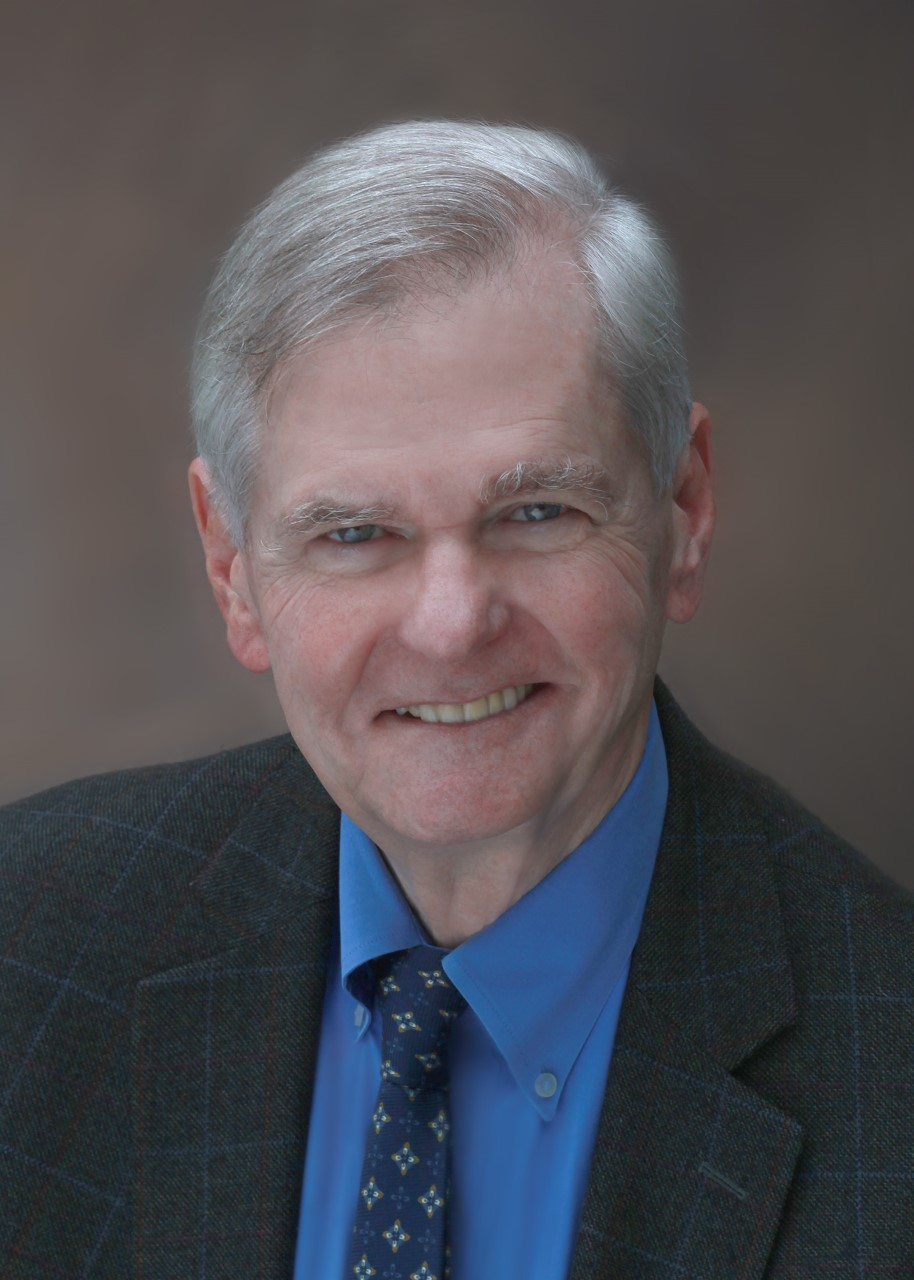
- Known for: Making metallic hydrogen in the fluid state
- Awards: Bridgman Award of International Association of High Pressure Science and Technology (AIRAPT); Duvall Award of American Physical Society (APS); Fellow, Division of Condensed Matter Physics of APS

Academic background
- Education: BS Physics; PhD Physics
- Alma mater: Loyola University Chicago; Iowa State University

William J. Nellis is an American physicist. He is an associate of the Physics Department of Harvard University. His work has focused on ultra-condensed matter at extreme pressures, densities and temperatures achieved by fast dynamic compression.

He is the recipient of the Bridgman Award of AIRAPT, the Duvall Award of APS and is a fellow of the APS Division of Condensed Matter Physics.

== Early life and education ==
Nellis received his B.S. degree in Physics from Loyola University of Chicago, College of Liberal Arts and Sciences, in 1963 and his Ph.D. degree in Physics from Iowa State University in 1968.

== Career and work ==
From 1970 to 1973, Nellis was assistant professor of Physics at Monmouth College (ILL). In 1973, he left Monmouth to join Lawrence Livermore National Laboratory (LNLL). There he made the first experimental observation of a metallic phase of dense hydrogen.

In 2004, Nellis joined the Department of Physics at Harvard University as an associate.

Nellis was the president of International Association for the Advancement of High Pressure Science and Technology from 2003 to 2007.

== Awards and honors ==
- 1987 - Fellow of the American Physical Society Division of Condensed Matter Physics
- 1998 - Duvall Award of American Physical Society Topical Group on Shock Compression
- 2001 - Bridgman Award of the International Association for the Advancement of High Pressure Science and Technology

== Books ==
- Nellis, W. J. (2017). Ultracondensed Matter by Dynamic Compression. Cambridge University Press. Bibcode:2017umdc.book.....N.

== Selected articles ==
- Nellis, W. J.; Mitchell, A. C.; van Thiel, M.; Devine, G. J.; Trainor, R. J.; Brown, N. (1 August 1983). "Equation-of-state data for molecular hydrogen and deuterium at shock pressures in the range 2–76 GPa (20–760 kbar)a)". The Journal of Chemical Physics. 79 (3): 1480–1486. Bibcode:1983JChPh..79.1480N. doi:10.1063/1.445938. ISSN 0021-9606.
- Nellis, W. J.; Maple, M. B.; Geballe, T. H. (3 May 1988). Gunshor, Robert L. (ed.). "Synthesis Of Metastable Superconductors By High Dynamic Pressure". Multifunctional Materials. 878: 2. Bibcode:1988SPIE..878....2N. doi:10.1117/12.943949.
- Edwards, P. P.; Johnston, R. L.; Rao, C. N. R.; Tunstall, D. P.; Nellis, W. J.; Louis, A. A.; Ashcroft, N. W. (15 January 1998). "Metallization of fluid hydrogen". Philosophical Transactions of the Royal Society of London. Series A: Mathematical, Physical and Engineering Sciences. 356 (1735): 119–138. arXiv:cond-mat/9708144. Bibcode:1998RSPTA.356..119N. doi:10.1098/rsta.1998.0153.
