= Breyite =

General
- Category: Minerals
- Formula: Ca_{3.01(2)}Si_{2.98(2)}O_{9}
- IMA symbol: Byi
- Crystal system: Triclinic
- Space group: P1̅
- Unit cell: a_{0} = 6.6970(4) Å, b_{0}= 9.2986(7) Å, c_{0} = 6.6501(4) Å, α = 83.458(6)°, β = 76.226(6)°, γ = 69.581(7)°

Identification
- Colour: colorless
- Cleavage: not observed
- Luster: vitreous
- Density: 3.072 g/cm^{3}
- Ultraviolet fluorescence: non-fluorescent

Breyite is a high pressure calcium silicate mineral (CaSiO_{3}) found in diamond inclusions. It is the second most abundant inclusion after ferropericlase, for diamonds with a deep Earth origin. Its occurrence can also indicate the host diamond's super-deep origin. This mineral is named after German mineralogist, petrologist and geochemist Gerhard P. Brey.

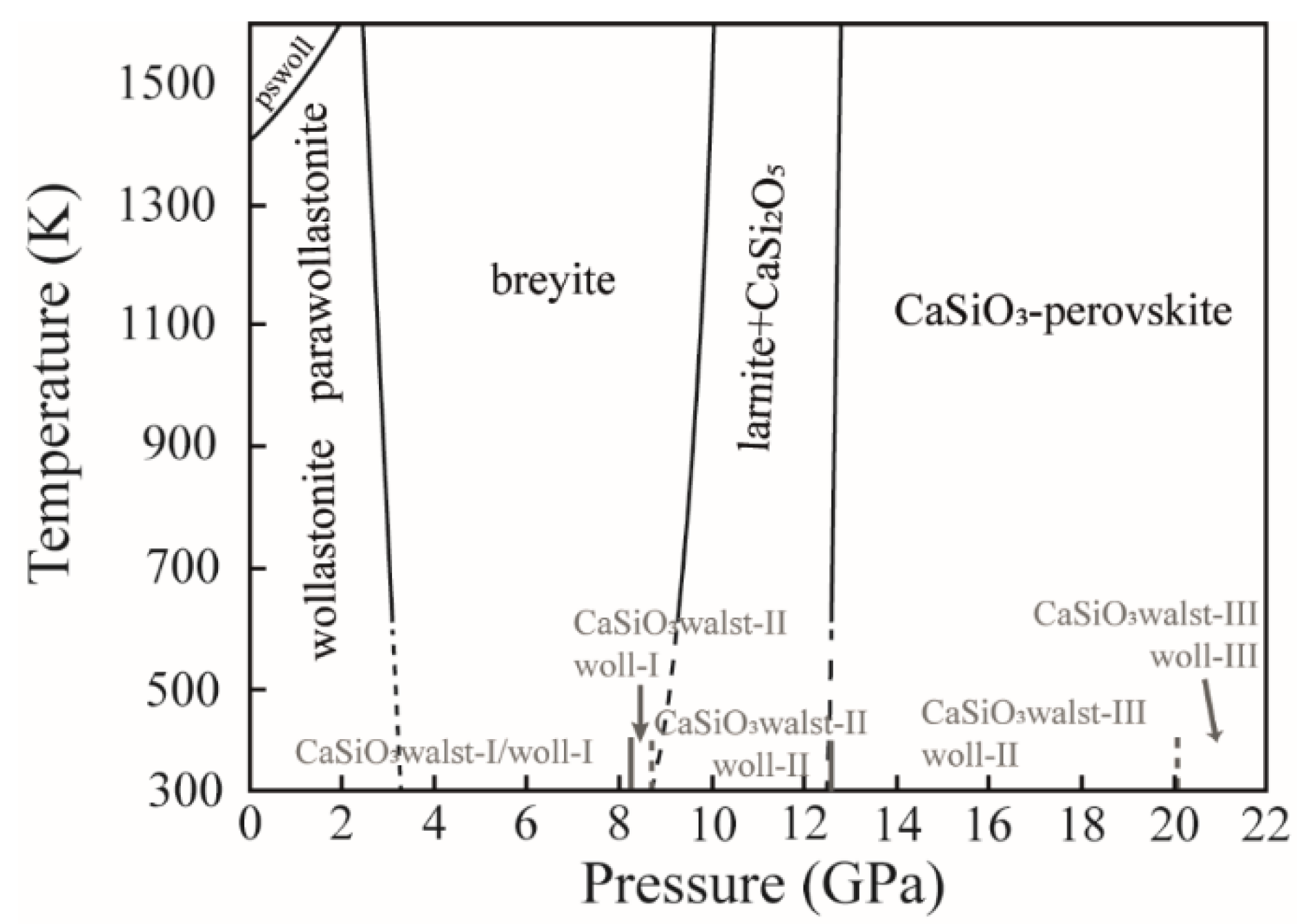
CaSiO_{3} phase diagram showing Breyite is stable around 3-9 GPa
