= Krzysztof Świerkosz =

Polish poet and literary critic

Krzysztof Świerkosz (Polish pronunciation: [ˈkʂɨʂtɔf ˈɕfjɛrkɔʂ]; born 1966 in Wrocław) is a Polish poet and literary critic. Some of his works appeared in Monographs Macie swoich poetów. Liryka polska urodzona po 1960 roku and Parnas Bis. Słownik literatury polskiej urodzonej po 1960 roku.

== Works ==
- Posokowy epos (1986)
- Dwoje nieznajomych w nadfioletowej twierdzy życia (1990)
- Obieżyświat (2009)
