= Journal of Non-Equilibrium Thermodynamics =

- Discipline: Non-equilibrium thermodynamics
- Language: English
- Edited by: Karl Heinz Hoffmann

Publication details
- History: 1976-present
- Publisher: Walter de Gruyter
- Frequency: Quarterly
- Impact factor: 4.290 (2021)

Standard abbreviations
- ISO 4: J. Non-Equilib. Thermodyn.

Indexing
- CODEN: JNETDY
- ISSN: 0340-0204 (print); 1437-4358 (web)
- LCCN: 77649840
- OCLC no.: 42731871

Links
- Journal homepage; Online access

The Journal of Non-Equilibrium Thermodynamics is a quarterly peer-reviewed scientific journal covering the field of non-equilibrium thermodynamics. It was established in 1976 by Jurgen Keller and its current editor-in-chief is Karl-Heinz Hoffmann (Chemnitz University of Technology).

== Abstracting and indexing ==
The journal is abstracted and indexed in:

- Astrophysics Data System
- Chemical Abstracts Service
- EBSCO databases
- Compendex
- Scopus
- Inspec
- Current Contents/Physical, Chemical and Earth Sciences
- Science Citation Index
- Zentralblatt Math

According to the Journal Citation Reports, the journal has a 2021 impact factor of 4.290.
