= Most Excellent Order of the Pearl of Africa =

Highest civilian award of Ugandan honours system

- Type: Single grade order
- Established: 2001
- Country: Uganda
- Ribbon
- Status: Currently constituted
- Grades: Grand Master

Statistics
- Total inductees: 8

Precedence
- Next (higher): None
- Next (lower): Excellent Order of the Pearl of Africa

The Most Excellent Order of the Pearl of Africa (Swahili: Nishani Ubora wa Lulu ya Afrika) is the highest civilian award of the Ugandan honours system and is awarded to heads of state and government leaders.

== History ==
The award was instituted in 2001 with the National Honours and Awards Act, 2001 along with other awards.

== Recipients ==
Name	Country	Title	Year
Julius Nyerere (posthumous)	Tanzania	1st President	2007
Jakaya Kikwete	Tanzania	4th President	2007
Paul Kagame	Rwanda	President	2012
Teodoro Obiang Nguema Mbasogo	Equatorial Guinea	President	2012
Armando Guebuza	Mozambique	President	2013
Shah Karim al-Hussaini, Aga Khan IV	United Kingdom	Imam	2017
Abiy Ahmed	Ethiopia	Prime Minister	2018
Emmerson Mnangagwa	Zimbabwe	President	2019
Shah Rahim al-Hussaini, Aga Khan V	United Kingdom	Imam	2025
