= Polish Journal of Chemistry =

- Discipline: Chemistry
- Language: English, Polish

Publication details
- History: 1921–2009
- Publisher: Polish Chemical Society (Poland)
- Frequency: Monthly

Standard abbreviations
- ISO 4: Pol. J. Chem.

Indexing
- CODEN: PJCHDQ
- ISSN: 0137-5083
- LCCN: 78646285
- OCLC no.: 03875870

Links
- Journal homepage

The Polish Journal of Chemistry was a peer-reviewed scientific journal on chemistry and the official journal of the Polish Chemical Society. The journal covered all fields of pure chemistry (physical, theoretical, inorganic, organic and bioorganic) as well as medicinal, macromolecular and supramolecular chemistry, and molecular modelling. It was established in 1921 under the title Roczniki Chemii (ISSN 0035-7677) and obtained its later title in 1978. The last editor-in-chief was Z. Galus (University of Warsaw).

The December 2009 issue was the last to be published since the Polish Chemical Society joined the ChemPubSoc Europe consortium to become one of the founders of the European Journal of Inorganic Chemistry and the European Journal of Organic Chemistry.
