= Africa Food Prize =

Annual award for contribution to African agriculture

The Africa Food Prize, originally the Yara Prize, is an annual award for contributions to African agriculture.

== Yara Prize ==
Yara International, a Norwegian chemical company and a large producer of fertilizer, established the Yara Prize for a Green Revolution in Africa in 2005. According to the company, "The Yara Prize aims at celebrating significant achievements related to food and nutrition security and sustainable agriculture with a transformative power."

The first recipient was Meles Zenawi, prime minister of Ethiopia. The choice of recipient received criticism in Norway from human rights organisations and exiled Ethiopians, due to his political history. About 1 000 people demonstrated against the award being given to him. Human Rights Watch stated that

Indeed, Prime Minister Meles has poured more resources into agricultural development than most African leaders. But as Human Rights Watch has found, the prime minister’s government exploits its control over fertilizer and other vital agricultural inputs to keep the country’s huge rural population under tight political control.

== Africa Food Prize ==
In 2016, the Yara Prize became the Africa Food Prize, a $100,000 annual award. As of 2021, the Africa Food Price Committee is chaired by Olusegun Obasanjo, former president of Nigeria.

The first Africa Food Price winner was Kayano F. Nwanze, president of the International Fund for Agricultural Development. Obasanjo stated that "Dr. Nwanze's accomplishments on behalf of African farmers are a reminder of what's possible when you combine passion, good ideas, commitment, focus, hard work and dedication."
