= Leonard Medal =

- Awarded for: outstanding contributions to the science of meteoritics and closely allied fields.
- Presented by: Meteoritical Society
- Reward: Medal
- First award: 1966
- Website: https://meteoritical.org/awards/leonard-medalists

The Leonard Medal honors outstanding contributions to the science of meteoritics and closely allied fields. It is awarded by the Meteoritical Society. It was established in 1962 to honor the first President of the Society, Frederick C. Leonard.

== Leonard Medal Winners ==
Leonard Medal Winners
Year	Name
1966	Carlyle Smith Beals
1967	Harvey H. Nininger
1968	Ernst Öpik
1969	Harold C. Urey
1970	Fred L. Whipple
1971	E. L. Krinov
1972	Brian Harold Mason
1973	John Reynolds
1974	Edward Anders
1975	Gerald J. Wasserburg
1976	James R. Arnold
1977	Hans E. Suess
1978	John A. Wood
1979	Paul Ramdohr
1980	Heinrich Wänke
1981	George W. Wetherill
1982	Robert N. Clayton
1983	Johannes Geiss
1984	B. Y. Levin
1985	Eugene M. Shoemaker
1986	Ralph Belknap Baldwin
1987	Masatake Honda
1988	Klaus Keil
1989	Victor S. Safronov
1990	Peter Eberhardt
1991	Donald D. Clayton
1992	John T. Wasson
1993	Robert M. Walker
1994	Alastair Cameron
1995	Friedrich Begemann
1996	Donald E. Brownlee
1997	Ernst Zinner
1998	S. Ross Taylor
1999	Grenville Turner
2000	Günter W. Lugmair
2001	Harry Y. McSween Jr
2002	Donald D. Bogard
2003	Herbert Palme
2004	Michael Julian Drake
2005	Joseph I. Goldstein
2006	Michael J. Gaffey
2007	Michel Maurette
2008	Edward R. D. Scott
2009	Lawrence Grossman
2010	Hiroshi Takeda
2011	François Robert
2012	Donald Burnett
2013	Ahmed El Goresy
2014	Roger Hewins
2015	Jeffrey N. Cuzzi
2016	Hiroko Nagahara
2017	Mark H. Thiemens
2018	Sasha Krot
2019	Hisayoshi Yurimoto
2020	Michael Zolensky
2021	Katharina Lodders
2022	Kevin McKeegan
2023	Andrew Davis
2024	Monica Grady

== See also ==
- List of astronomy awards
- Glossary of meteoritics
