= Nininger Meteorite Award =

Science award

- Awarded for: Outstanding student achievement in the "Science of Meteoritics" as embodied by an original research paper.
- Presented by: Center for Meteorite Studies
- First award: 1965

The Nininger Meteorite Award awarded by the Center for Meteorite Studies recognizes outstanding student achievement in the "Science of Meteoritics" as embodied by an original research paper. In 1965, Dr. Harvey H. Nininger and Mrs. Addie D. Nininger endowed the Nininger Science of Meteoritics Fund to the Center for Meteorite Studies at Arizona State University in order to promote interest in meteorite-related topics among young scientists. A number of prominent planetary scientists and meteoriticists have won this award including William K. Hartmann, Hap McSween, and Dante Lauretta.

== Nininger Meteorite Award winners ==
Source: Nininger Past Recipients

Year	Name	Title of Paper
1961–1962	Michael E. Lipschutz	On the Origin of Diamonds in Iron Meteorites
1961–1962	Craig M. Merrihue	Meteoritic Xenon and the Origin of the Meteorite
1961–1962	Michael Fernandez	Locating Meteorite Falls from Micro-meteorites in Soil Samples
1962–1963	Michael Duke	Petrology of the Basaltic Achondrite Meteorites
1962–1963	James L. Setser	Determination of the Abundance of Zirconium and Hafnium in Meteorites, Tektites and Terrestrial Materials
1963–1964	Marvin W. Rowe	Gamma Radioactivity and Rare Gases in Meteorites and Terrestrial Materials
1963–1964	Ned Read	The Determination of the Orientation of the Cut-Plane through an Iron Meteorite Relative to its Crystal Structure
1964–1965	William K. Hartmann	Terrestrial and Lunar Flux of Large Meteorites through the Solar System
1964–1965	Joseph I. Goldstein	The Growth of the Widmanstatten Pattern in Metallic Meteorites
1965–1966	John William Larimer	The Petrology of Chondritic Meteorites in the Light of Experimental Studies
1965–1966	Marvin W. Rowe	Xenomalies
1966–1967	Billy P. Glass	Microtektites and the Origin of the Australasian Tektite Strewn Field
1966–1967	Donald P. Elston	Accretion of the Murray Carbonaceous Chondrite and Implications Regarding Chondrule and Chondrite Formation
1967–1968	G. Jeffrey Taylor	On the Thermal History of Chondrites
1967–1968	Benjamin N. Powell	Petrology and Chemistry of Mesosiderites
1967–1968	Patrick Freeman	Versailles Cryptoexplosive Structure
1968–1969	Robert B. Finkelman	Analysis and suggested Origin of Magnetic Particles Extracted from Manganese Nodules
1968–1969	Paul A. Mueller	A Study of FeII Disorder in Chondritic Orthopyroxenes using the Mössbaur Effect
1969–1970	Christine A. Jones	Tritium Measurements in Recently Fallen Meteorites and in Apollo 12 Lunar Samples
1969–1970	Laurel L. Wilkening	Particle Track Studies and the Origin of Gas-Rich Meteorites
1970–1971	Chen-Lin Chou	Gallium and Germanium in the Metal and Silicate Phases of L- and LL- Chondrites; Implications for the Thermal History of the Chondrites
1971–1972	J. Marvin Herndon	Magnetic Paleothermometry of Carbonaceous Chondrites and the Evidence for a Magnetic Field Prior to Meteorite Formation
1972–1973	J. Marvin Herndon	The Occurrence, Origin and Significance of Magnetite in Carbonaceous Meteorites
1972–1973	William R. Kelley	The Chemical Composition of Metallic Spheroids and Metallic Particles Within Impactite From Barringer Meteorite Crater, Arizona
1972–1973	John L. Remo	A New Interpretation of the Mechanical Properties of the Gibeon Meteorite
1973–1974	James H. Chen	U-Th-Pb Radiometric INvestigations of the Allende Carbonaceous Chondrite
1973–1974	R. Dee Sherrill	An Alternative Approach to the Concept of Carbonaceous Chondrite Fission
1974–1975	Kathleen Mark	Craters-A Brief History of Their Recognition
1974–1975	Paul P. Sipiera	Devitrification Studies on Chemical Compositions Corresponding to Ca-Al-Rich Inclusions in the Allende Meteorite
1975–1976	Lisa M. Albright	On the Nature of the Natural Remnant Magnetism (NRM) of Iron Meteorites
1975–1976	Stanley M. Cisowski	The Effect of Shock on the Remnant Magnetism of Rocks from the Lonar Crater, India
1976–1977	Harry Y. McSween Jr	The Chemical Composition of the Chondrules and Inclusions in Carbonaceous Chondrites
1976–1977	Edward Stolper	Experimental Petrology and the Origin of Eucritic Meteorites
1977–1978	Horton E. Newsom	Primitive Metal Condensates from the Solar Nebula, a clue from the Bencubbin Meteorite
1977–1978	Lindy Leung	In Search of Ancient Magnetic Field Traces in H-chondrites
1978–1979	Mark J. Cintala	Meteoroid Impact into Comet Nuclei: Implications for the Polymict Brecciated Meteorites, Apollo Asteroid Spectra, and Comet-Meteorite Orbital Relationships
1978–1979	M. Bruce Fegley Jr.	Chondrite Mineralogy and Equilibrium Chemistry of the Alkalis, Halogens, and Phosphorus in the Primitive Solar Nebula
1979–1980	Alan E. Rubin	Derivation of a Heterogeneous Poikilitic Lithic Fragment in the Bovedy L3 Chondrite from the Impact-Melted Porphyritic Chondrules
1979–1980	Steven B. Simon	Petrography, Bulk Chemistry and petrology of Chondrules in the Allende Meteorite
1980–1981	John H. Jones	The Geochemical Coherence of Pu and ND and the ^{244}Pu/^{238}U Ratio of the Early Solar System
1980–1981	Leanne Wiberg	The Hico Structure: A Possible Impact Structure in North-Central Texas
1981–1982	Alan S. Kornacki	Petrography Classification, and the Origin of the Fine- to Coarse-Grained Ca, Al-Rich Inclusions in the Allende C3 (V) Chondrite
1981–1982	Peter T. Wlasuk	The Contributions of Hubert A. Newton to Nineteenth-Century Meteoritics
1982–1983	Stephen R. Sutton	Thermoluminescence (TL) Dating of Shock-Metamorphosed Rock from Meteor Crater, Arizona: Shock Threshold for TL Resetting and Post-Impact Temperature of the Crater Floor
1983–1984	R. Kyle Guimon	Thermoluminescence and Metamorphism in Type 3 Ordinary Chondrules
1984–1985	Bradley D. Keck	Thermoluminescence and Metamorphism in the CO Chondrites
1985–1986	David Lusby	Ubiquitous High-FeO Silicates in the Enstatite Chondrites: Implications for the Chondrule Forming Process
1986–1987	Joel D. Blum	Are Opaque Assemblages in the Ca, Al-Rich Inclusions in Chondtritic Meteorites Really "Fremdlinge?"
1986–1987	John A. Garges	Detection and Classification of Meteoritic Material at the Ries Impact Crater by Determination of Osmium Isotopic Accelerator Mass Spectrometry
1987–1988	Lindsay P. Keller	Calcic Micas in the Allende CV3 Chondrite: Implications for the Alteration of Ca- and Al-Rich Inclusions
1987–1988	Michael R. Wing	On the Origin of Polycyclic Aromatic Hydrocarbons in the Carbonaceous Chondrites: Evidence for Thermal and Aqueous Alteration in the Parent Planet
1988–1989	Chad T. Olinger	An Extraterrestrial Origin of the Polar Sediment Particles: Confirmation by Neon Isotopic Analysis of Individual Samples
1989–1990	Timothy McCoy	Metamorphism, Brecciation and Parent Body Structures of LL-Group Chondrites
1989–1990	Tian Xie	Meteorites Identification and Pairing Recognition Expert System (MIPRES)
1990–1991	Xiaoyue Xiau	Study on Formation Processes of Carbonaceous Chondrites - A Continuous Distribution of Highly Volatile Trace Elements
1991–1992	Stephen F. Wolf	Evidence for a H Chondrite Meteoroid Stream
1992–1993	Don D. Eisenhour	Were Chondrules Formed by Light?
1993–1994	Edward S. Michlovich	Temporal Variation of H Chondrite Sources
1995–1996	Dante Lauretta	Experimental Studies of the History Sulfide Minerals from the Solar Nebula to Meteorite Parent Bodies
1997–1998	Thomas Burbine	Spectroscopy of Vestoids
2002–2003	Jon M. Friedrich	Chemical Studies of L Chondrites
2006	Lan-Anh Nguyen	Characterization of presolar silicate grains in the Acfer 094 and ALHA77307 carbonaceous chondrites by multi-detection raster ion imaging in the NanoSIMS
2007	Nicolas Ouellette	Injection of supernova dust into the protoplanetary disk
2008	Mary Sue Bell	Experimental shock decomposition of siderite and the origin of magnetite in Martian meteorite ALH84001
2008	Anat Shahar	Astrophysics of CAI formation as revealed by silicon isotope LA-MC-ICPMS of an igneous CAI
2009	Nicholas Moskovitz	The distribution of basaltic asteroids in the Main Belt
2010	Gregory Brennecka	^{238}U/^{235}U Variations in Meteorites: Extant ^{247}Cm and Implications for Pb-Pb Dating
2011	Andrew Beck	Diogenites as polymict breccias composed of orthopyroxenite and harzburgite
2012	David Baker	The transition from complex craters to multi-ring basins on the Moon: Quantitative geometric properties from Lunar Reconnaissance Orbiter Lunar Orbiter Laser Altimeter (LOLA) data
2013	Brandon Johnson	Impact spherules as a record of an ancient heavy bombardment of Earth
2014	Ingrid Daubar	The current Martian cratering rate
2015	Roger Fu	Nebular magnetic fields recorded by the Semarkona meteorite
2016	François Tissot	Origin of uranium isotope variations in early solar nebula condensates
2017	Emily Worsham	Siderophile element systematics of IAB complex iron meteorites: New insights into the formation of an enigmatic group
2018	Jonathan Lewis	Chondrule porosity in the L4 chondrite Saratov: Dissolution, chemical transport, and fluid flow
2020	Clara Maurel	Meteorite evidence for partial differentiation and protracted accretion of planetesimals

== See also ==
- Glossary of meteoritics
- Harvey H. Nininger
- Center for Meteorite Studies
- List of astronomy awards
- Prizes named after people
