= School of Molecular Sciences =

Academic unit of The College of Liberal Arts and Sciences at Arizona State University

The School of Molecular Sciences is an academic unit of The College of Liberal Arts and Sciences at Arizona State University (ASU). The School of Molecular Sciences (SMS) is responsible for the study and teaching of the academic disciplines of chemistry and biochemistry at ASU.

== History ==
Chemistry instruction at ASU can be traced back to the early 1890s. At that time, the educational institution, a Normal School for the Territory of Arizona, “acquired...a supply of chemicals” for instructional purposes. Chemistry classes were held in Old Main during the late 1800s and into the early 1900s, taught by Frederick M. Irish.

In 1927, President Arthur John Matthews hired George Bateman, the first faculty to hold a PhD who was not also a principal or president of the school. Bateman taught chemistry classes, among other things, for forty years. He oversaw the development of the physical sciences at ASU, including new science facilities and degrees.

In 1946, new majors leading to degrees were added, including Physical and Biological Science. In 1947 the State of AZ designated $525,000 for a new science building.

In 1953 the first college, the College of Arts and Sciences was established with 14 departments. In 1954 Arizona State College was restructured into 4 colleges, which went into effect in the 1955–56 academic year: the College of Liberal Arts, the College of Education, the College of Applied Arts and Sciences, and the College of Business and Public Administration.

In 1957, the Department of Chemistry first appeared in the Arizona State College Bulletin (Vol. LXXII No. 2, April 1957), listed under the Division of Physical Sciences. Early chemists, such as LeRoy Eyring helped build ASU's strong science reputation; Roland K. Robins conducted cancer research as early as 1957.

In 1958, Arizona State College was renamed Arizona State University. Chemistry was the first department to be approved to offer a doctoral degree.

In 1960, George Boyd, the university's first coordinator of research, helped secure a portion of Harvey H. Nininger’s meteorites for ASU, making it the largest university-based meteorite collection in the world.

In 1961, Geochemist Carleton B. Moore became the first director of the Center for Meteorite Studies, which at the time was housed in the Department of Chemistry.

In 1963, Peter R. Buseck, who pioneered high-resolution transmission electron microscopy (TEM) research on meteorites and terrestrial minerals.

In 1963, ASU awarded its first doctoral degrees to four students, one of whom, Jesse W. Jones, was the first Chemistry PhD of ASU and the first African American to earn a PhD at ASU. Jones went on to teach chemistry at Baylor University for over 30 years.

In 1965 Robert Pettit was hired and began developing marine-organism research that led to the creation of anti-cancer drugs and, in 1973, what became the Cancer Research Institute. Pettit taught at ASU until his retirement in 2021.

In 1967, George Bateman, after enjoying a productive forty-year career at ASU, retired. The Bateman Physical Sciences Complex was named to honor his many contributions and years of service in 1977.

In 1992 the Department of Chemistry was renamed the Department of Chemistry and Biochemistry.

In 2015 the department became the School of Molecular Sciences to recognize the fact that modern chemical science has impact well beyond the traditional disciplinary boundaries of chemistry and biochemistry. Rather than being discipline-based, the school's mission is to tackle important societal problems in medicine, technology, energy and the environment from an atomic and molecular perspective.

== Chairs and Directors ==
- George Bateman (1957–1961)
- LeRoy Eyring (1961–1969)
- Therald Moeller (1969–1975)
- Morton Munk (1975–1986)
- William Glaunsinger (1986–1989)
- Morton Munk (1989–1998)
- Devens Gust (1998–2002)
- Robert Blankenship (2002–2006)
- William Petuskey (2006–2012)
- Daniel Buttry (2012–2016)
- Neal Woodbury (2016–2019)
- Ian Gould (2019–2021)
- Tijana Rajh (2021–present)

== Location ==
The administrative offices of the School of Molecular Sciences are located within the Bateman Science Complex on ASU's Tempe campus. Faculty labs are located in the Bateman Complex, in the Biodesign Institute, and the ISTB1 and ISTB5 buildings.

== Research ==
Research in the School of Molecular Sciences is organized around six themes:

- Materials and Nanoscience
- Medicine and Health
- Energy and Sustainability
- Chemistry of Biology
- Environmental and Biogeochemistry
- Fundamental Molecular Science

== Scientific Firsts ==
- In 1969 the first measurements of carbon in Apollo Mission lunar-return samples were obtained by Carleton Moore and Charles Lewis.
- In 1970 the first extraterrestrial amino acids were detected by Carleton Moore in the Murchison meteorite.
- In 1975 the first quantitative chemical analyses of individual atmospheric aerosol particles was done by Peter Buseck using an electron microprobe.
- In 1999 the first images of atomic orbitals were obtained from a combined electron diffraction and X-Ray diffraction study of the mineral cuprite, Cu_{2}O, by Michael O’Keeffe and John Spence of the Department of Physics at ASU.
- The first MOFs were designed and synthesized by Michael O’Keeffe and Omar Yagi, who at the time was an assistant professor of chemistry and biochemistry at ASU, opening the field of reticular chemistry.
- Petra Fromme's group was part of the team that generated the first crystal structure of a protein using the X-Ray free electron laser method.
- In 2017 the first fully online biochemistry degree in the nation were launched by the School of Molecular Sciences, including innovative hands-on lab courses, followed in 2020 by the first fully online chemistry degree in the nation.

== Notable Current and Former Faculty Members ==
- Michael O’Keeffe
- Omar Yaghi
- Alex Navrotsky
- Austen Angell
- George "Bob" Pettit
- Carleton B. Moore
- Peter R. Buseck

== Notable alumni ==
- Jesse W. Jones was the first chemistry PhD and earned one of the first four doctorate degrees awarded by Arizona State University in 1963. He is a tenured professor of chemistry at Baylor University since 1988 and served seven two-year terms as a State Representative of Texas. In 2012 he was inducted into the African American Education Archives & History Program Hall of Fame.
- Spencer Silver graduated from ASU in 1962. He was a chemist and inventor who specialized in adhesives; he is credited by 3M for creating the adhesive that is used on Post-It Notes.
- Ed Pastor received his Bachelor of Arts degree in chemistry from ASU. He served as a member of the United States House of Representatives for the state of Arizona from 1991 to 2015.
- Cheryl Shavers, who grew up in South Phoenix, earned both undergraduate and PhD degrees in chemistry. She subsequently worked for Motorola, Hewlett Packard, and Intel, then became Under Secretary of Commerce and Technology (1999–2001) in the Clinton administration. She was inducted into the Women in Technology International (WITI) Hall of Fame, and the Hall of Fame of ASU's College of Liberal Arts and Sciences.
- Jeffrey Post earn his PhD from ASU in (date needed) and serves as the Mineralogist and Curator-in-Charge of Gems and Minerals at the National Museum of Natural History, the home of the Hope Diamond.
- Laurie Leshin, Director of the NASA Jet Propulsion Laboratory, earned her bachelor's in chemistry in 1987.
