= Frederick C. Leonard =

American astronomer

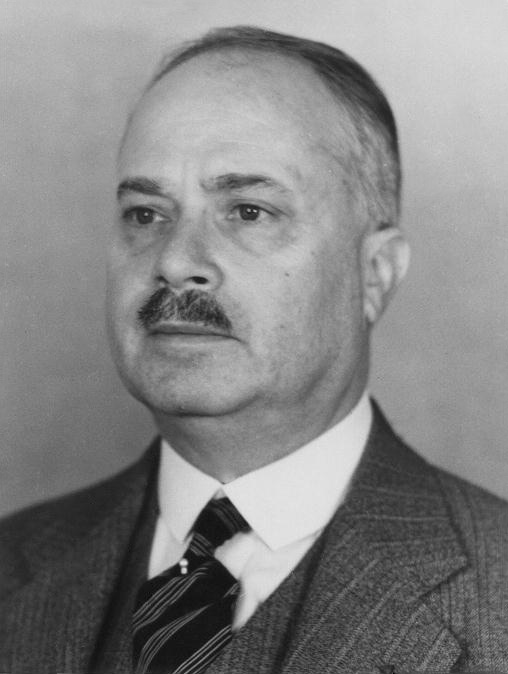
- Dr. Frederick C. Leonard in 1947
- Born: March 12, 1896; Mount Vernon, IN
- Died: June 23, 1960 (aged 64); Los Angeles, CA
- Citizenship: United States
- Education: University of Chicago, University of California at Berkeley
- Scientific career
- Workplaces: University of California at Los Angeles

Frederick Charles Leonard (March 12, 1896 – June 23, 1960) was an American astronomer. As a faculty member at the University of California, Los Angeles, he conducted extensive research on double stars and meteorites, largely shaping the university's Department of Astronomy. He received his undergraduate degree from the University of Chicago in 1918 and his PhD in astronomy from the University of California, Berkeley in 1921. Leonard was an astronomer from his teenage years, founding the Society for Practical Astronomy in 1909. In 1933 he founded The Society for Research on Meteorites, which later became known as the Meteoritical Society. He was its first president and was the Editor of the Society's journal for the next 25 years. The Society instituted the Leonard Medal in 1962, its premier award for outstanding contributions to the science of meteoritics and closely allied fields.

== Early life ==
Leonard was born in Mount Vernon, Indiana in 1896 and moved with his family to Chicago in about 1900, eventually settling near the University of Chicago. From the age of eight, he showed great interest in the stars and by early adolescence had become an active amateur astronomer. In 1909 he attended the annual meeting of the Astronomical and Astrophysical Society of America, held at the Yerkes Observatory. The same year, he organized the Society for Practical Astronomy (SPA), a national amateur organization. Leonard's leadership raised concerns among professional astronomers as not all were in favor of amateur contributions to the profession. Nonetheless, the organization flourished until Leonard's departure in 1919.

Leonard was a prolific writer and by the age of 14 had attracted the attention of numerous publishers. He authored a year-long series of articles titled "Mr. Leonard's Star Colors" in the English Mechanic and World of Science. A Chicago Tribune reporter characterized him as a "co-worker with such savants as Prof. F. R. Moulton" and Francis P. Leavenworth.

After graduating from Hyde Park High School in Chicago, Leonard completed his bachelor's and master's degrees at the University of Chicago. He continued his graduate education at the University of California, Berkeley with Armin Leuschner, being awarded his PhD in 1922 for his thesis "An Investigation of the Spectra of Visual Double Stars".

== Career ==
Leonard joined the University of California, Los Angeles faculty in 1922 as instructor of astronomy in the Department of Mathematics and founded the Department of Astronomy in 1931 which he headed till his death in 1960.

Leonard initially focused his university research on double stars, which he studied using the facilities at Mount Wilson Observatory. (The equipment for astronomy teaching was very poor at that time; but he got access to telescopes on Mt.Wilson and continued to observe stars and planets for some years). The university didn't obtain the research university mandate till after the World War II. Before shifting his focus to meteoritics he discovered at least 25 double stars. His interest in meteorites started in the mid to late 1920s. Leonard started corresponding with Harvey H. Nininger about meteorite purchases in 1930, and from that point forward, the majority of Leonard's contributions to astronomy surrounded his study of meteorites with a special focus on their systematics and statistics. In 1933 he founded The Society for Research on Meteorites, now known as the Meteoritical Society, with himself as president and Harvey H. Nininger as secretary. He accumulated a large collection of meteorites, examining them as part of his studies to form a revised and simplified meteorite classification scheme. Although the scheme's validity is still a subject of some controversy, it remains one of Leonard's most well-known contributions. Leonard translated his research into teaching material and offered the first class in Meteoritics at the university in 1937. He did his best for the Meteoritical Society to flourish and managed a lot of difficulties during WWII and especially after the war period.

Throughout Leonard's career, even during times of intense research, teaching remained his primary dedication. Three of "Leonard’s prize pupils" became planetarium directors later in life. He was honoured by "striking a medal in his name" after his death for the contribution he had made to the development of the Meteoritical Society

=== Kuiper belt hypothesis ===
Leonard was one of the first astronomers to hypothesize the existence of a trans-Neptunian population. In 1930, soon after Pluto's discovery by Clyde Tombaugh, Leonard pondered whether it was "not likely that in Pluto there has come to light the first of a series of ultra-Neptunian bodies, the remaining members of which still await discovery but which are destined eventually to be detected".

== Personal life ==
Leonard married Rhoda Walton in Victoria, B. C., Canada in 1942. They had two sons – Roderick and Frederick.

== Death ==
Leonard suffered a stroke in May 1960 and died on June 23.

== Works ==
- (1935) - Bibliography of Meteorities: Second 1935 List
- (1946) – A catalog of provisional numbers for the meteoritic falls of the world
- (1956) – Catalogue of the Meteoritic Falls of the World
