= Peter R. Buseck =

American academic and chemist

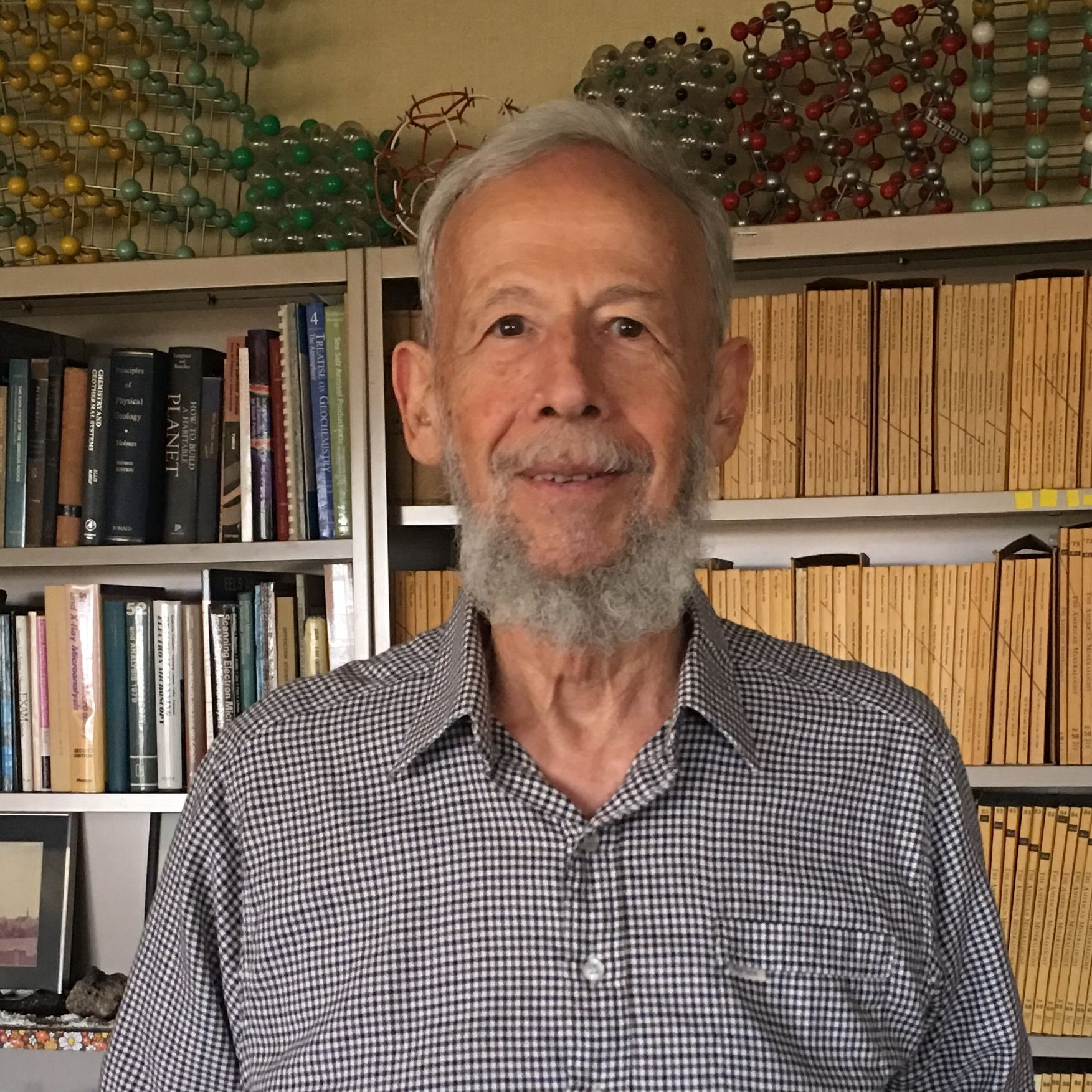
- Born: September 30, 1935 (age 90); Frankfurt, Germany
- Citizenship: United States
- Education: Antioch College; Columbia University
- Awards: Roebling Medal
- Scientific career
- Fields: Chemistry; Geochemistry; Crystallography
- Workplaces: Arizona State University

Peter R. Buseck (born September 30, 1935) is a Regents Professor in the School of Molecular Sciences (SMS) at Arizona State University (ASU). He is a pioneering researcher in the application of transmission electron microscopy to mineralogy, meteoritics, fullerenes and atmospheric chemistry. In 2019 Buseck was awarded the Roebling Medal, the highest award of the Mineralogical Society of America. The scientific journal Nature recognized Buseck's 1978 paper as a milestone in crystallography.

== Early life and education ==
Buseck is the only child of Paul and Edith Buseck. He was born on September 30, 1935, in Frankfurt, Germany. His family emigrated to the United States in February 1937. His education was in the public schools of New York City, graduating in 1952 from the Bronx High School of Science. Buseck attended Antioch College in Yellow Springs, Ohio, where he majored in and received an A.B. in geology in 1957. While at Antioch, Buseck had cooperative education jobs at Harvard University, the United States Geological Survey in Denver, Colorado, the Scripps Institution of Oceanography, the United States Forest Service at Mount Baker, Washington (state), and mining companies in Peru and Chile.

Buseck's graduate studies (Master of Science and Doctor of Philosophy) were at Columbia University, under the direction of thesis advisor Prof. Chas. H. Behre Jr., studying mineral deposits in the United States and Mexico. Buseck completed work for his Ph.D. in 1961 and received his Ph.D. in 1962. He did post-doctoral research at the Geophysical Laboratory, Carnegie Institution of Washington from 1961 to 1963, where he learned experimental techniques in mineralogy.

== Career ==
In 1963 Buseck was hired by Arizona State University with joint appointments to the Department of Geology (now the School of Earth and Space Exploration) and the Department of Chemistry (now the School of Molecular Sciences), where he continues his professional career. Buseck studied phenomena from geological, chemical, and physical perspectives, which gave his research an interdisciplinary character when such collaborations were rare.

Buseck's research primarily involved the application of transmission electron microscopy (TEM) in four major areas: mineralogy, meteoritics, fullerenes and related carbon phases, and atmospheric chemistry. Buseck, along with John Armstrong, obtained the first quantitative chemical analyses of airborne particles. Buseck was also a pioneer in high-resolution transmission electron microscopy (HRTEM) mineralogy, which allowed crystal structures to be imaged directly. Buseck also performed some of the earliest mineralogical research on carbonaceous chondrite meteorites.

Sabbatical-year appointments were at the Inorganic Chemistry Laboratory (ICL) and Department of Geology at Oxford University (1970–71), Stanford University Department of Geology (1976-1977); Laboratory Mineralogie & Cristallographie, University of Paris VII (1985–86); Special Assistant, Office of the Director of the National Science Foundation (1994–95), and Department of Earth and Planetary Sciences, Harvard University (2001-2002).

In 2021, the Center for Meteorite Studies at ASU was named in honor of Buseck.

== Selected publications ==
- Rafal E. Dunin-Borkowski; Martha R. McCartney; Richard B. Frankel; Dennis A. Bazylinski; Mihály Pósfai; Peter R. Buseck (1 December 1998). "Magnetic microstructure of magnetotactic bacteria by electron holography". Science. 282 (5395): 1868–1870. Bibcode:1998Sci...282.1868D. doi:10.1126/science.282.5395.1868. ISSN 0036-8075. PMID 9836632. Wikidata Q31962871.
- Peter R. Buseck; Mihály Pósfai (30 March 1999). "Airborne minerals and related aerosol particles: effects on climate and the environment". Proceedings of the National Academy of Sciences of the United States of America. 96 (7): 3372–9. Bibcode:1999PNAS...96.3372B. doi:10.1073/pnas.96.7.3372. ISSN 0027-8424. PMC 34277. PMID 10097046. Wikidata Q28776188.
- Mihály Pósfai; Dennis A. Bazylinski; Richard B. Frankel (1 May 1998). "Reaction sequence of iron sulfide minerals in bacteria and their use as biomarkers". Science. 280 (5365): 880–883. Bibcode:1998Sci...280..880P. doi:10.1126/science.280.5365.880. ISSN 0036-8075. PMID 9572727. Wikidata Q32065079.
