= Brian Mason (geochemist) =

New Zealand-American geochemist

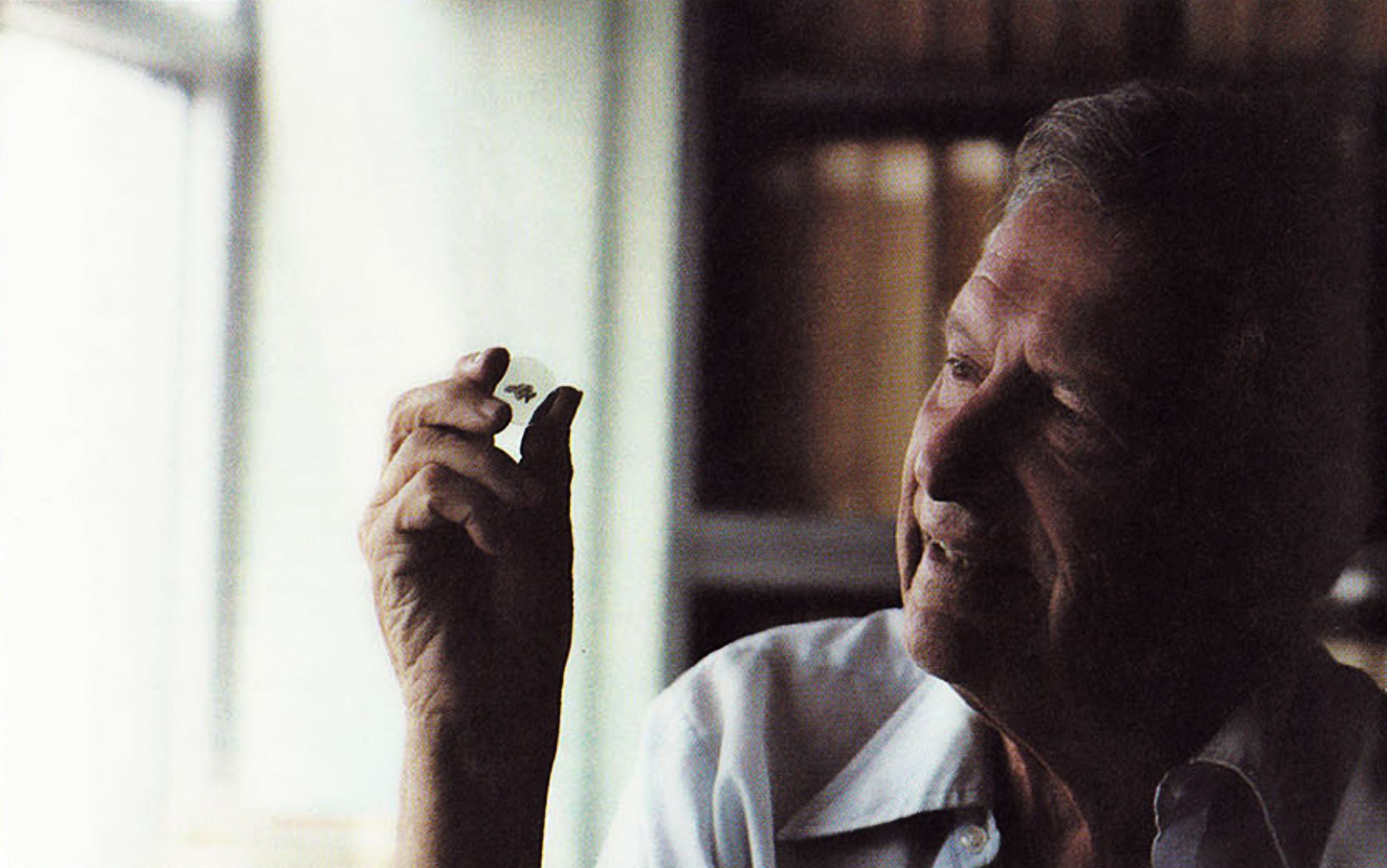
- Mason showing a slice of a Moon meteorite, May 1994
- Born: Brian Harold Mason; 18 April 1917; Port Chalmers, New Zealand
- Died: 3 December 2009 (aged 92); Washington, D.C., U.S.
- Education: Stockholm University
- Known for: Meteorite classification
- Awards: Leonard Medal; Roebling Medal (1993)
- Scientific career
- Fields: Geochemistry; mineralogy; meteoritics
- Workplaces: Indiana University; Smithsonian Institution
- Thesis: Mineralogical aspects of the system FeO - Fe_{2}O_{3} - MnO - Mn_{2}O_{3} (1943)
- Doctoral advisor: Victor Moritz Goldschmidt
- Doctoral students: Ross Taylor

Brian Harold Mason (18 April 1917 – 3 December 2009) was a New Zealand geochemist and mineralogist who was one of the pioneers in the study of meteorites. He played a leading part in understanding the nature of the Solar System through his studies of meteorites and lunar rocks. He also examined and classified thousands of meteorites collected from Antarctica.

== Life ==
Mason was born in Port Chalmers, Dunedin, in 1917 and was brought up in Christchurch. He was educated at Christchurch Boys' High School and studied geology and chemistry at Canterbury University College, graduating MSc with first-class honours in 1939. In November, he left for Norway to work towards a doctorate, arriving in January 1940, but along with a colleague who held a British passport fled to Sweden in May following Operation Weserübung, the German invasion of Norway. In 1943, he completed a PhD in geochemistry at the Stockholm University under Victor Goldschmidt and left the country for Britain.

Mason returned to Christchurch where he was appointed lecturer in geology at Canterbury University College. He taught there for two years. In 1947, he was appointed professor of mineralogy at Indiana University where he was based for rest of his life. He was a curator of mineralogy at both the American Museum of Natural History, New York, and the Smithsonian Institution, Washington, D.C.

Mason died in Washington, D.C., on 3 December 2009 from renal failure. He was survived by his stepson, Frank W. Turner, who lived with Mason in Chevy Chase, MD.

His third wife, Margarita C. Babb, and mother of Frank Turner, died on 3 February 2009 due to complications from multiple myeloma. They were married for 15 years. Mason was married two other times, first to Anne Marie Linn and then to Virginia Powell; both marriages ended in divorce. He had a son, George, with his second wife. George died in a mountain climbing accident in 1981 at the age of 20.

== Awards and honours ==
- Mason won the Leonard Medal from the Meteoritical Society in 1972 and the Roebling Medal from the Mineralogical Society of America in 1993.
- He was appointed an Honorary Fellow of the Royal Society of New Zealand in 1984.
- Two minerals, brianite and stenhuggarite, have been named after Mason. Brianite is a phosphate mineral (Na_{2}CaMg(PO_{4})_{2}) and stenhuggarite (Swedish: stenhuggare, meaning "mason") is a rare iron-antimony mineral.
- Asteroid 12926 Brianmason, discovered by Christine J. Schiff in 1999, is named in his honour. The official naming citation was published by the Minor Planet Center on 13 October 2000 (M.P.C. 41386).

== Selected works ==
- The literature of geology, American Museum of Natural History, 1953
- Meteorites, Wiley, 1962
- The lunar rocks, Authors Brian Harold Mason, William G. Melson, Wiley-Interscience, 1970, ISBN 978-0-471-57530-6
- Handbook of elemental abundances in meteorites, Editor Brian Harold Mason, Gordon and Breach, 1971
- Principles of Geochemistry Editor Carleton B. Moore, Wiley, 1982, ISBN 978-0-471-57522-1
- Victor Moritz Goldschmidt: father of modern geochemistry, Geochemical Society, 1992, ISBN 978-0-941809-03-0

== See also ==
- Glossary of meteoritics
