= Richard Frankel =

Richard Frankel may refer to:

- Richard B. Frankel, professor of physics
- Richard Frankel (producer) (born 1947), theatre producer
