= Krinov =

Krinov (Russian: Кринов) is a surname, and may refer to:

- 2887 Krinov (1977 QD5), a Main-belt Asteroid discovered in 1977
- Yevgeny Krinov (1906–1984), D.G.S., a Soviet Russian astronomer and geologist
