= J. Lawrence Smith Medal =

Science award

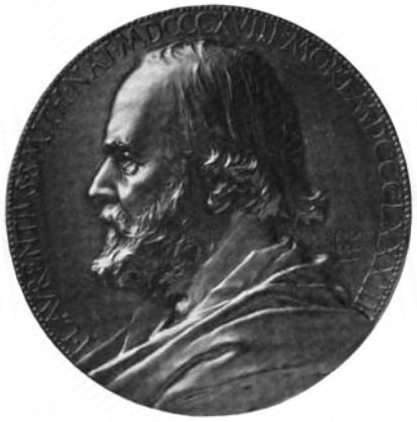
- Awarded for: investigations of meteoric bodies.
- Presented by: United States National Academy of Sciences
- Reward: Medal
- First award: c. 1888
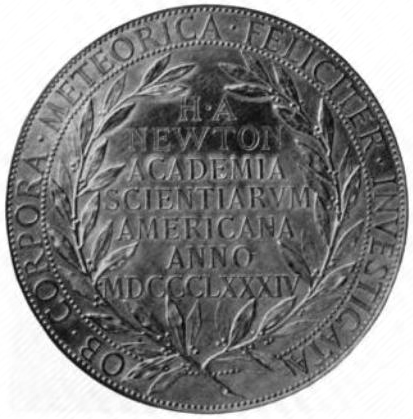

The J. Lawrence Smith Medal is awarded every three years by the National Academy of Sciences for investigations of meteoric bodies. The medal's namesake is the American chemist and meteoriticist J. Lawrence Smith.

== Recipients ==
List of recipients:

- H. A. Newton (1888)
- George P. Merrill (1922)
- Stuart H. Perry (1945)
- Fred L. Whipple (1949)
- Peter M. Millman (1954)
- Mark G. Inghram (1957)
- Ernst J. Opik (1960)
- Harold C. Urey (1962)
- John H. Reynolds (1967)
- Edward P. Henderson (1970)
- Edward Anders (1971)
- Clair C. Patterson (1973)
- John A. Wood (1976)
- Ralph B. Baldwin (1979)
- G. J. Wasserburg (1985)
- A. G. W. Cameron (1988)
- Robert M. Walker (1991)
- Donald E. Brownlee (1994)
- Ernst K. Zinner (1997) – For his pioneering studies of the isotopic composition of circumstellar dust grains preserved in meteorites, opening a new window to the formation of the solar nebula.
- George W. Wetherill (2000) – For his unique contributions to the cosmochronology of the planets and meteorites and to the orbital dynamics and formation of solar system bodies.
- John T. Wasson (2003) – For important studies on the classification, origin, and early history of iron meteorites and chondritic meteorites, and on the mode of formation of chondrules.
- Klaus Keil (2006) – For his pioneering quantitative studies of minerals in meteorites and important contributions to understanding the nature, origin, and evolution of their parent bodies.
- Robert N. Clayton (2009) – For pioneering the study of oxygen isotopes to unravel the nature and origin of meteorites, showing that meteorites were assembled from components with distinct nuclear origins.
- Harry Y. McSween Jr. (2012) – For his studies of the igneous and metamorphic histories of the parent planets of the chondritic and achondritic meteorites, with particular emphasis on his work on the geological history of Mars based on studies of Martian meteorites and spacecraft missions to this planet.
- Hiroko Nagahara (2015) – For her work on the kinetics of evaporation and condensation processes in the early Solar System and her fundamental contributions to one of the most enduring mysteries in meteoritics, the formation of the chondrules that constitute the characteristic component of the most abundant group of meteorites.
- Kevin D. McKeegan (2018) – For contributions to understanding of the processes and chronology of the early solar system as recorded by primitive meteorites, for innovation in analytical instrumentation, and for showing that the oxygen isotopic compositions of the Earth and rocky planets and meteorites are distinctly different from that of the Sun.
- Meenakshi Wadhwa (2021) – For deepening the world's understanding of the evolutionary history of the solar system through her significant contributions to the sciences of cosmochemistry, solar system chronology, meteoritics, and trace element geochemistry.
- Edward D. Young (2024) –For deepening our understanding of the history of the solar system and its place in the galaxy through his extensive contributions to both experimental and theoretical meteoritics and solar system research.

== See also ==
- List of astronomy awards
- Glossary of meteoritics
