= George Wetherill =

American physicist and geologist (1925–2006)

- Born: 12 August 1925; Philadelphia, Pennsylvania, US
- Died: 19 July 2006 (aged 80); Washington, D.C., US
- Education: University of Chicago (Ph.B., S.B. S.M., Ph.D., 1953)
- Known for: Planet Formation; Meteoritics; Radioactive Dating
- Spouses: Phyllis Steiss Wetherill; Mary Bailey
- Children: Rachel Wetherill; Sarah Wetherill Okumura; George W. Wetherill III
- Awards: National Medal of Science (1997); F. C. Leonard Medal of the Meteoritical Society (1981); G. K. Gilbert Award of the Geological Society of America (1984); Gerard P. Kuiper Prize of the Division of Planetary Sciences of the American Astronomical Society (1986); Harry H. Hess Medal of the American Geophysical Union (1991); Henry Norris Russell Lectureship of the American Astronomical Society (2003)
- Scientific career
- Fields: Astrophysics, geology
- Workplaces: Carnegie Institution (Washington, DC) (1953-1960,1975–1997); University of California, Los Angeles (Los Angeles, CA) (1960-1975)

George Wetherill (August 12, 1925 – July 19, 2006) was an American physicist and geologist. He was the director emeritus of the department of terrestrial magnetism at the Carnegie Institution of Washington.

In 2000, Wetherill received the J. Lawrence Smith Medal from the National Academy of Sciences "For his unique contributions to the cosmochronology of the planets and meteorites and to the orbital dynamics and formation of solar system bodies." In 2003, Wetherill received the Henry Norris Russell Lectureship, the highest honor bestowed by the American Astronomical Society, "For pioneering the application of modern physics and numerical simulations to the formation and evolution of terrestrial planets."

== Early life and education ==
George Wetherill was born on August 12, 1925, in Philadelphia. Wetherill benefited from the G.I. Bill to receive four degrees, the Ph.B. (1948), S.B. (1949), S.M. (1951), and Ph.D., in physics (1953), all from the University of Chicago. He did his thesis research on the spontaneous fission of uranium, as well as nuclear processes in nature, as a U.S. Atomic Energy Commission Predoctoral Fellow.

== Career and achievements ==
=== Department of Terrestrial Magnetism (1953–1960) ===
After receiving his Ph.D., Wetherill became a staff member at Carnegie's Department of Terrestrial Magnetism (DTM) in Washington, D.C. There, he joined an interdepartmental group who were working to date rocks using geochemical methods that measured natural radioactive decay. This involved determining the concentration and isotopic composition of inert gases such as argon, as well as the isotopes of strontium and lead.

Wetherill originated the concept of the Concordia Diagram for the uranium-lead isotopic system; this diagram became the standard means for determining precise ages of rocks, and of detecting the possibility of metamorphism. It provides a basis for high-precision geochronology of rocks dating back through the history of the planet Earth.

Wetherill was also a member of the Carnegie group that accurately determined the decay constants of potassium and rubidium, an effort that has also become fundamental to the measurement of geological time.

=== University of California, Los Angeles ===
Wetherill left DTM in 1960 to become a professor of geophysics and geology at the University of California, Los Angeles. There, he served as chairman of the interdepartmental curriculum in geochemistry (1964-1968), and as chairman of the Department of Planetary and Space Sciences (1968-1972).

At UCLA, Wetherill further explored techniques for age-dating, examining extraterrestrial material with radiometric chronology techniques to meteorite and lunar samples. At the same time, he began to theorize about the origin of meteorites. His studies concentrated on collisions between objects in the asteroid belt together with resonances between their motions and those of planets. He computed how these events could move material into Earth-crossing orbits to become meteorites or larger Earth-impacting bodies responsible for the devastating impacts that caused mass extinctions of the majority of living species, including the dinosaurs.

Later, Wetherill, along with scientists elsewhere, proposed that a certain unusual class of meteorites was not asteroidal in origin but instead came from the planet Mars. This was later confirmed by laboratory work elsewhere and is now well accepted.

=== Department of Terrestrial Magnetism (1975–1991) ===
In 1975, Wetherill returned to Carnegie's Department of Terrestrial Magnetism as director. He remained director until 1991, when he became a staff member. At DTM, he began extending his research efforts into questions concerning the origin of the terrestrial planets--Mercury, Venus, Earth, and Mars. He was stimulated by earlier studies by Victor Safronov (O. Yu. Schmidt Institute, Moscow), who showed that as a swarm of planetesimals coagulated into large bodies the swarm could evolve to produce a few terrestrial planets. Wetherill developed a technique to calculate numerically the orbital evolution and accumulation of planetesimal swarms, and he used the technique to reach specific predictions of the physical and orbital properties of terrestrial planets. His results agreed well with present observations.

In addition to showing how the inner solar system formed, Wetherill's work provided the basis for a model of a giant-impact origin for the Moon and the core of Mercury. It also led to explanations for the isotopic abundances of present-day planetary atmospheres.

Wetherill has shown that Jupiter plays an important role in the evolution of the Solar System; by ejecting comets from the Solar System, it offers a protective presence to the inner planets. Wetherill's theoretical work supports discussions on the origins of the Solar System as well as on extrasolar planets.

=== Community engagement ===
Wetherill provided leadership in the scientific community by serving on advisory committees for NASA, the National Academy of Sciences, and the National Science Foundation. For 15 years, he was editor of the Annual Review of Earth and Planetary Sciences.

He served as president of the Meteoritical Society, the Geochemical Society, the Planetology Section of the American Geophysical Union, the International Association of Geochemistry and Cosmochemistry, and was a member of the American Philosophical Society.

Wetherill died at his home in Washington, D.C., on July 19, 2006, aged 80, after a long illness.

== Awards ==
- 1974, Member, National Academy of Sciences
- 1977, National Medal of Science, National Science Foundation
- 1981, Leonard Medal, Meteoritical Society
- 1984, G. K. Gilbert Award, Geological Society of America
- 1986, G. P. Kuiper Prize of the Division of Planetary Sciences of the American Astronomical Society
- 1991, Harry H. Hess Medal of the American Geophysical Union
- 1997, National Medal of Science awarded by President Clinton
- 2000, J. Lawrence Smith Medal, National Academy of Sciences
- 2003, Henry Norris Russell Lectureship, American Astronomical Society
