= 4765 Wasserburg =

Hungaria asteroid, suspected binary system and asteroid pair

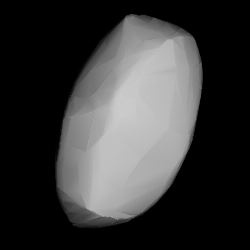
- Shape model of Wasserburg from its lightcurve

Discovery
- Discovered by: C. Shoemaker
- Discovery site: Palomar Obs.
- Discovery date: 5 May 1986

Designations
- Named after: Gerald J. Wasserburg (American geologist)
- Alternative designations: 1986 JN_{1} · 1983 EA_{1} 1986 LF
- Minor planet category: main-belt (inner) · Hungaria

Orbital characteristics
- Epoch 4 September 2017 (JD 2458000.5)
- Uncertainty parameter 0
- Observation arc: 33.15 yr (12,108 days)
- Aphelion: 2.0621 AU
- Perihelion: 1.8289 AU
- Semi-major axis: 1.9455 AU
- Eccentricity: 0.0599
- Orbital period (sidereal): 2.71 yr (991 days)
- Mean anomaly: 237.52°
- Mean motion: 0° 21^{m} 47.52^{s} / day
- Inclination: 23.710°
- Longitude of ascending node: 76.546°
- Argument of perihelion: 108.33°
- Known satellites: 1 (suspected)

Physical characteristics
- Mean diameter: 1.777±0.485 km 3.82 km (calculated)
- Synodic rotation period: 3.6231±0.0005 h 3.625±0.001 h 3.62532±0.00002 h (Note: Pravec (2010) web: rotation period 3.62532±0.00002 hours with a brightness amplitude of 0.59 mag. Quality code of 3. Summary figures at Collaborative Asteroid Lightcurve Link – CALL and Pravec, P.; Wolf, M.; Sarounova, L. (2010)); 3.626±0.005 h (Note: Pravec (2013) web: rotation period 3.626±0.005 hours with a brightness amplitude of 0.25 mag. Quality code of 3. Summary figures at Collaborative Asteroid Lightcurve Link – CALL and Pravec, P.; Wolf, M.; Sarounova, L. (2013)); 3.6260±0.0005 h 3.6280±0.0005 h 3.664±0.003 h 3.67±0.02 h (dated)
- Geometric albedo: 0.4 (assumed); 1.000±0.087
- Spectral type: E B–V = 0.852±0.043; V–R = 0.456±0.023; V–I = 0.813±0.040
- Absolute magnitude (H): 13.7 · 14.1

4765 Wasserburg (prov. designation: 1986 JN_{1}) is a bright Hungaria asteroid, suspected binary system and asteroid pair from the innermost regions of the asteroid belt, approximately 3 kilometers (1.9 miles) in diameter. It was discovered on 5 May 1986, by American astronomer Carolyn Shoemaker at Palomar Observatory, and later named after geologist Gerald J. Wasserburg.

== Orbit and classification ==
Wasserburg is a bright member of the Hungaria family, which form the innermost dense concentration of asteroids in the Solar System. It orbits the Sun in the inner main-belt at a distance of 1.8–2.1 AU once every 2 years and 9 months (991 days). Its orbit has an eccentricity of 0.06 and an inclination of 24° with respect to the ecliptic. It was first identified as 1983 EA_{1} at Palomar in 1983, extending the body's observation arc by 3 years prior to its official discovery observation.

Wasserburg forms an asteroid pair with (350716) 2001 XO_{105}, and was part of Petr Pravec's sample study Formation of asteroid pairs by rotational fission, published in the journal Nature.

== Naming ==
This minor planet was named after American Gerald J. Wasserburg (1927–2016), who was a professor of geology and geophysics at Caltech in California. He was a pioneer of radiometric dating methods used in isotope geochemistry and was prominent for his accurate age determination measurements of Moon rocks, which were instrumental for reconstructing the origin of the Moon and for the hypothesis of the Late Heavy Bombardment. Wasserburg also carried out isotopic analyses of meteorites, developed a time scale for the formation and evolution of the Solar System, and contributed to the theory of nucleosynthesis. The official naming citation was published on 27 June 1991 (M.P.C. 18464).

== Physical characteristics ==
=== Diameter and albedo ===
According to preliminary results from the survey carried out by NASA's Wide-field Infrared Survey Explorer (WISE) with its subsequent NEOWISE mission, Wasserburg measures 1.777 kilometers in diameter and its surface has an outstandingly high albedo of 1.000, while the Collaborative Asteroid Lightcurve Link assumes it to be an E-type asteroid, with albedo of 0.40 – derived from 434 Hungaria the family's namesake and most prominent member – and calculates a larger diameter of 3.82 kilometers with an absolute magnitude of 13.7.

=== Rotation period ===
Between 2006 and 2014, several rotational lightcurves of Wasserburg were obtained from photometric observations by astronomers Brian Warner at his Palmer Divide Observatory (716), Petr Pravec at Ondřejov Observatory, and Julian Oey at Blue Mountains Observatory (E19). Best rated lightcurve analysis gave a well-defined rotation period between 3.6231 and 3.6280 hours with a brightness variation between 0.07 and 0.60 magnitude (U=3/3/3/3-). (Note: lightcurve plot Modra-PDO (A) and lightcurve plot Modra-PDO (B) taken at Modra, PDO, by Kusnirak and Pravec, rotation period 3.62532±0.00002 hours with a brightness amplitude of 0.59 mag. Quality Code of 3. Time span: 3 January 2010 to 7 March 2010. lightcurve plot Warner Palmer Divide Observatory, Brian D. Warner (2010). rotation period 3.625±0.001 hours with a brightness amplitude of 0.60±0.02 mag.Quality Code = 3. Time span: 5 and 8 January 2010.) Due to the changing amplitude, Wasserburg is likely one of the more elongatedly shaped primary asteroids of all known smaller binaries with a diameter of less than 10 kilometers.

== Satellite ==
After being already recognized as an asteroid pair, American astronomer Brian Warner observed faint mutual eclipsing and occultation events in April 2013. After repeated lightcurve subtraction, he was able to show that Wasserburg is likely a binary system with a minor-planet moon orbiting it every 15.97 hours. Assuming a depth of 0.03 magnitude, he estimated a secondary-to-primary mean-diameter ratio of 0.16±0.02. The Johnston's archive derives a diameter of 280±80 meters for the satellite, based on the primary diameter given by WISE. A semi-major axis of 2.9 kilometers is also estimated for the moons orbit. However, photometric observations taken in 2015, could not detect the presence of a satellite and Wasserburg remains only a suspected binary.
