= Mark Inghram =

American physicist (1919–2003)

Mark G. Inghram
- Born: November 13, 1919; Livingston, Montana, U.S.
- Died: September 29, 2003 (aged 83); Holland, Michigan, U.S.
- Education: Olivet College; University of Chicago
- Known for: First use of meteorites to find the age of the Earth
- Scientific career
- Fields: Physics
- Workplaces: University of Chicago
- Doctoral students: John Reynolds; Gerald J. Wasserburg; George Wetherill

Mark Gordon Inghram (November 13, 1919 – September 29, 2003) was an American physicist. Inghram was a member of the National Academy of Sciences.

== Life ==
Inghram was born in Livingston, Montana. He did undergraduate work at Olivet College, receiving a B.A. in 1939. He worked in the Manhattan Project during World War II and at Argonne National Laboratories from 1945 to 1947. He received his Ph.D. from the University of Chicago in 1947. He began teaching at the University of Chicago as an instructor in 1947 and remained there until his retirement in 1985. He died at his home in Holland, Michigan in 2003. He received the Quantrell Award.

== Age of the Earth ==
Together with Clair Patterson and George Tilton, Inghram was one of the first scientists to combine measurements on meteorites and the Earth to find the age of the Earth. Over time, the decay of uranium to lead will change the isotopic makeup of terrestrial lead. Patterson, Tilton and Inghram assumed that iron meteorites, which contain lead but virtually no uranium, formed at the same time as the Earth. Assuming this to be true, the isotopic makeup of lead in iron meteorites should still be the same as that of the newly formed Earth, so the Earth can be dated by comparing the composition of lead in iron meteorites with that in new volcanic material on the Earth. Patterson, Tilton and Inghram did this and found that the Earth was approximately 4.5 billion years old.
