= Carleton Moore =

American scientist (1932–2023)

Carleton Bryant Moore (September 1, 1932 – February 10, 2023) was an American scientist who was Emeritus Regents Professor in the School of Molecular Sciences (SMS) and the School of Earth and Space Exploration (SESE) at Arizona State University (ASU). He was a pioneering researcher in the field of meteorite studies, and the founding Director of the ASU Center for Meteorite Studies, which houses the world's largest university-based meteorite collection. Moore is credited with being the first scientist to detect carbon in lunar samples returned by the Apollo astronauts and he was also one of the researchers credited with identifying the first extra-terrestrial amino acids in a meteorite. Both an asteroid, 5046 Carletonmoore in 1981, and a mineral, carletonmooreite in 2021, were named in honor of his contributions to meteorite research.

== Early life and education ==
Moore was born on September 1, 1932, in Hempstead, New York. He was educated in the Hempstead schools, graduating in 1951. From 1951 to 1954, he attended Alfred University in the southern tier of New York state where he studied ceramic engineering and received a Bachelor of Science in glass technology. Moore worked at Brookhaven National Laboratory with Oliver Schaeffer and Nobel Laureate Raymond Davis in summer 1955 on a project using cosmic ray exposure to determine rock ages before beginning his graduate studies at the California Institute of Technology that fall.

At Caltech, Moore's graduate studies were primarily in chemistry, but also included a minor in geology under the direction of thesis advisor Harrison Brown. Moore earned his PhD in Chemistry in 1960 on The kinetics of the reactions of silver, lead, and thallium with thioacetamide, and The distribution of barium, titanium, manganese, chromium, iron, nickel and cobalt in stony meteorites.

== Career ==
After earning his PhD, Moore accepted a position at Wesleyan University, where he taught from 1960 to 1961. During this time, Moore was approached by George A. Boyd, acting on behalf of Arizona State University, to become the founding Director of ASU's Center for Meteorite Studies in the Department of Chemistry.

From 1963 to 1987, Moore acquired thirty-five research grants from NASA, the National Science Foundation (NSF), and the United States Geological Survey (USGS) related to the study of asteroids, lunar samples, geology, and materials science. Moore's work provided the foundation for the continued development of the Center for Meteorite Studies as well as the growth of astrophysics and planetary geology at ASU.

In 1969, Moore became editor of the journal Meteoritics, a position he held for twenty years as a member and fellow of the Meteoritical Society. In 1984, under Moore's leadership, Meteoritics won the Citation Index Impact Award.

In 2003, Moore retired from ASU, and became a member of ASU's Emeritus College. He had served as the Director for the Center for Meteorite Studies for 42 years, continuously holding the same administrative position his entire career. In addition, Moore was a professor in ASU's School of Molecular Sciences and the School of Earth and Space Exploration throughout his career.

Moore died on February 10, 2023, aged 90, in Mesa, Arizona.
