= John Reynolds (physicist) =

John Hamilton Reynolds
- Born: April 3, 1923; Cambridge, Massachusetts, U.S.
- Died: November 4, 2000 (aged 77); Berkeley, California, U.S.
- Education: Harvard University, University of Chicago
- Known for: Discovery of excess meteoritic ^{129}Xe
- Awards: John Price Wetherill Medal (1965); J. Lawrence Smith Medal (1967); Leonard Medal (1973)
- Scientific career
- Fields: Geophysics
- Workplaces: University of Chicago, University of California, Berkeley
- Doctoral advisor: Mark Inghram

John Hamilton Reynolds (April 3, 1923 – November 4, 2000) was an American physicist and a specialist in mass spectrometry.

== Life ==
John H. Reynolds was born April 3, 1923 in Cambridge, Massachusetts. He studied first at Harvard University and, after serving in the Navy during World War II, at the University of Chicago. There, he was influenced by his Ph.D. thesis advisor Mark Inghram and by two other famous physicists, Harold Urey and Enrico Fermi. He specialized in mass spectrometry and utilized this method to determine isotope ratios needed for the radiometric dating of geologically and cosmologically relevant samples.

In 1950 he was appointed as professor to the University of California, Berkeley where he continued his research on isotope ratios in meteorites, leading to the discovery in 1960 that the Richardton meteorite and other meteorites had an excess of xenon-129, thought to be a result of the beta decay of iodine-129 in the early Solar System. He was helped by a new all-glass spectrometer that he had designed, which allowed gas samples to be run through it multiple times, helping to increase the odds of detection and alleviate the low sensitivity problems plaguing earlier attempts by other researchers on other meteorites. Unlike many scientific discoveries, the significance of the discovery was well and widely understood at the time.

His improvement of potassium-argon dating was also adopted by several institutions.

Reynolds was a Guggenheim Fellow for the academic years 1956–1957 and 1986–1987. He was elected to the National Academy of Sciences in 1968. He died of pneumonia on November 4, 2000, in Berkeley, California.
