= Dante Lauretta =

American space science professor (b. 1970)

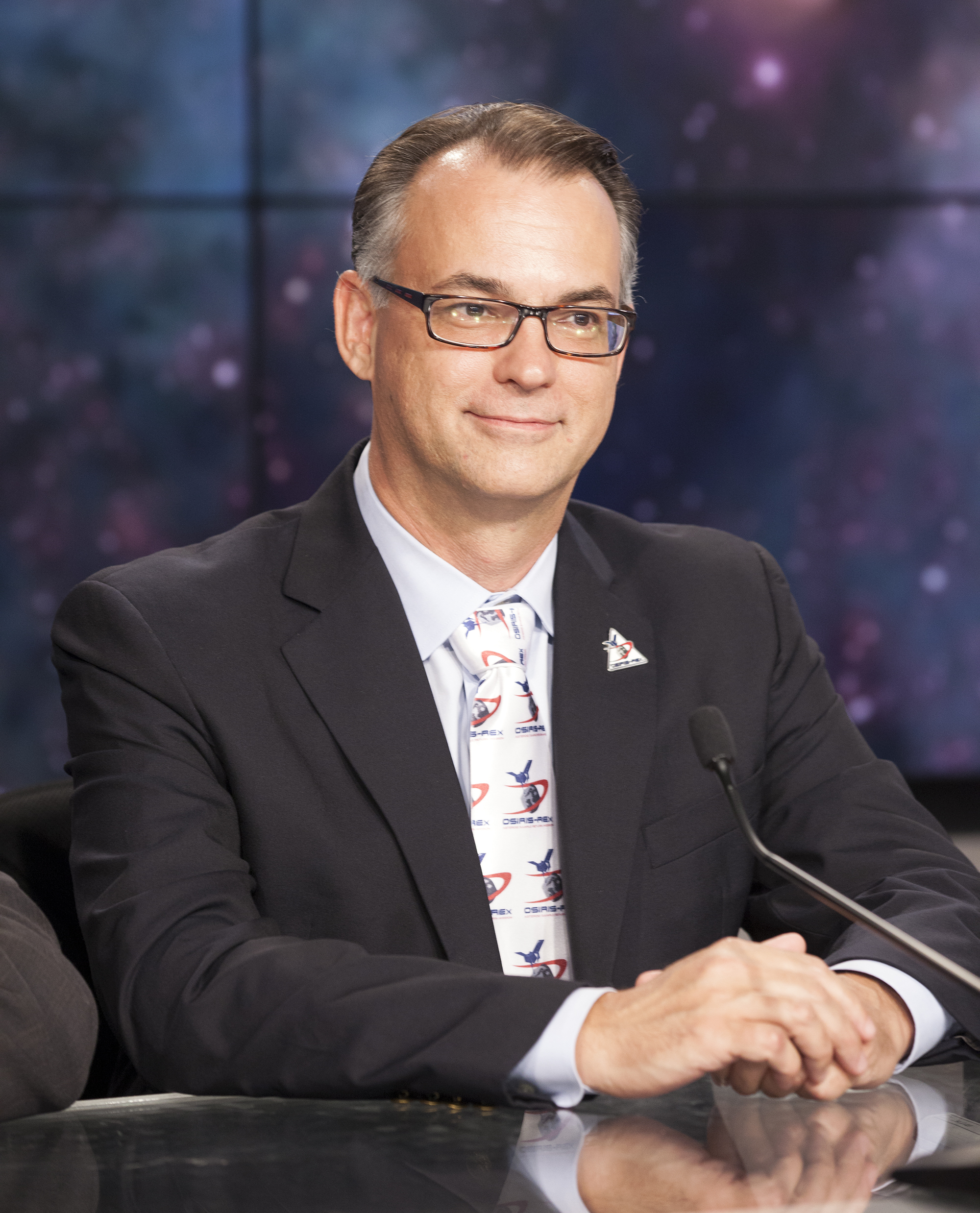
Lauretta at a prelaunch press conference for OSIRIS-REx.

Dante S. Lauretta (born 1970) is a professor of planetary science and cosmochemistry at the University of Arizona's Lunar and Planetary Laboratory. He is the principal investigator on NASA's OSIRIS-REx mission.

== Education ==
Lauretta grew up in Arizona and received a B.S. in physics and mathematics and a B.A. in Oriental Studies with focus in Japanese from the University of Arizona in 1993 and a Ph.D. in Earth and planetary sciences from Washington University in St. Louis in 1997. He was a postdoctoral research associate in the Department of Geological Sciences at Arizona State University from 1997 through 1999. He was an Associate Research Scientist in the Department of Chemistry and Biochemistry at Arizona State University from 1999 through 2001. He was hired onto the faculty at the University of Arizona in 2001.

== Work ==
His research focuses on the chemistry and mineralogy of asteroids and comets as determined by in situ laboratory analyses and spacecraft observations. This work is important for constraining the chemistry of the solar nebula, understanding the origin of complex organic molecules in the early Solar System, and constraining the initial chemical inventories of the terrestrial planets. He is an expert in the analysis of extraterrestrial materials. In particular, he uses inductively coupled plasma mass spectrometry (ICP-MS), scanning electron microscopy (SEM), transmission electron microscopy (TEM), electron microprobe analysis (EPMA), and X-ray diffraction (XRD) to study meteorites, lunar samples, and particles returned by the Stardust mission. Lauretta is known for his experimental work on the formation of iron-bearing sulfides in the solar nebula. He also worked on the cosmochemical behavior of various elements, such as mercury, boron and beryllium in meteorites. Asteroid 5819 Lauretta was named in his honor. He serves as the principal investigator on NASA's OSIRIS-REx mission to return at least 60 grams (2.1 oz) of regolith from carbonaceous asteroid 101955 Bennu in 2023.

== Awards ==
Lauretta was the recipient of the 2002 Nier Prize of the Meteoritical Society, and the 1995 Nininger Meteorite Award. He was selected as a Kavli Fellow of the National Academy of Sciences in 2008. He was a member of the 2002-2003 Antarctic Search for Meteorites for which he received the Antarctica Service Medal of the United States of America in 2010.

== Publications ==
- Co-author (with M. Katherine Crombie (his wife), Chris Gholson, and Erik Melchiorre) of Rich Hill: The History of Arizona's Most Amazing Gold District
- Co-author (with Marvin Killgore) of A Color Atlas of Meteorites in Thin Section (2005)
- Lead editor of the University of Arizona's Space Science series book Meteorites and the Early Solar System II (2006, University of Arizona Press) ISBN 978-0-8165-2562-1
- Co-editor (with Daniel Apai) of the Protoplanetary Dust volume (2010) in the Cambridge University Press Planetary Science Series
