= Yevgeny Krinov =

Soviet Russian astronomer and geologist (1906-1984)

Yevgeny Leonidovich Krinov (Russian: Евгений Леонидович Кринов) (3 March 1906 – 2 January 1984), D.G.S., was a Soviet Russian astronomer and geologist, born in Otyassy (Russian: Отъяссы) village in the Morshansky District of the Tambov Governorate of the Russian Empire. Krinov was a renowned meteorite researcher; the mineral Krinovite, discovered in 1966, was named after him.

== Scientific work ==
From 1926 through 1930 Yevgeny Krinov worked in the meteor division of the Mineralogy Museum of the Soviet Academy of Sciences. During this period he conducted research into the Tunguska event under the supervision of Leonid Kulik. Krinov took part in the longest expedition to the Tunguska site in the years 1929–1930 as an astronomer. The data that was gathered during this expedition became the basis for his 1949 monograph (in Russian) called The Tunguska Meteorite.

In 1975, Yevgeny Krinov ordered the burning of 1500 negatives from a 1938 expedition by Leonid Kulik to the Tunguska event as part of an effort to dispose of hazardous nitrate film. Positive imprints were preserved for further studies in the Russian city of Tomsk.

== Science awards ==
- 1961 - Doctor honoris causa awarded by the Soviet Academy of Sciences
- 1971 - Leonard Medal

== Legacy ==
- The mineral Krinovite, discovered in 1966, was named after him.
- A minor planet, 2887 Krinov, discovered in 1977 by Soviet astronomer Nikolai Stepanovich Chernykh, is named after him.

== Selected bibliography ==
- 1947 Spectral Reflective Capacity of Natural Formations
- 1949 The Tunguska Meteorite (Russian)
- 1952 Fundamentals of Meteoritics
- 1959 Sikhote-Alin Iron Meteorite Shower, Vol. I (Russian)
- 1963 Sikhote-Alin Iron Meteorite Shower, Vol. II (Russian)
- 1966 Giant Meteorites
