= Therald Moeller =

American chemist (1913-1997)

- Born: George Therald Moeller; April 3, 1913; North Bend, Oregon, United States
- Died: November 24, 1997 (aged 84); Broken Arrow, Oklahoma, United States
- Education: Oregon State College; University of Wisconsin-Madison (PhD)
- Known for: Inorganic Chemistry, an Advanced Text (1952)
- Scientific career
- Fields: Inorganic chemistry
- Workplaces: Michigan State College; University of Illinois Urbana-Champaign; Arizona State University
- Thesis: A Study of the Preparation and Certain Properties of Hydrous Lanthanum Oxide Sols (1938)
- Doctoral advisor: Francis Craig Krauskopf

George Therald Moeller (April 3, 1913- November 24, 1997) was an American chemist and emeritus professor of Arizona State University. He is known for his various books, including the textbook Inorganic Chemistry, an Advanced Text of 1952 which has been dubbed the "Bible of inorganic chemistry."

== Biography ==
=== Early life and studies ===
George Therald Moeller was born in North Bend, Oregon in 1913.

He graduated from Oregon State College, earning a degree in chemical engineering in 1934. Afterwards he attended the University of Wisconsin–Madison, where he obtained a Sigma Tau National Fellowship and a Du Pont Fellowship. He received his PhD in inorganic and physical chemistry in 1938. His thesis was titled "A Study of the Preparation and Certain Properties of Hydrous Lanthanum Oxide Sols"; his supervisor was Francis C. Krauskopf.

=== Career ===
From 1938 to 1940, Moeller served as instructor at Michigan State College before joining the University of Illinois Urbana-Champaign in 1940, where he became an expert in the chemistry of rare-earth elements. In 1969, he became chairman of the department of chemistry at Arizona State University (ASU), a role he held until 1975. Moeller retired in 1983 as emeritus professor at ASU.

In 1953, he published his book Inorganic Chemistry, an Advanced Text which was well received internationally and allowed US universities to teach advanced inorganic chemistry.

Moeller and John C. Bailar Jr. founded the Inorganic Chemistry Division of the American Chemical Society in 1959. Moeller served also as president of the board of directors of Inorganic Syntheses.

=== Personal life ===
Moeller married his wife Ellyn Stephenson in 1935, they had three children.

He died in Broken Arrow, Oklahoma in 1997.

== Honors and awards ==
In 1980, Arizona State University (ASU) established the Therald Moeller scholarship, to support students with a career in chemistry in the School of Molecular Sciences.

In 1981, he received the Award for Distinction in Undergraduate Teaching by the department of chemistry and in 1983 he received the Alumni Association's Distinguished Teacher Award as best instructor at ASU.

== Textbooks ==
- Moeller, Therald (1952). Inorganic Chemistry: An Advanced Textbook. Wiley. ISBN 978-0-471-61215-5.
- Moeller, Therald (1963). The Chemistry of the Lanthanides. Reinhold Publishing Corporation.
- Moeller, Therald; O'Connor, Rod (1972). Ions in aqueous systems: an introduction to chemical equilibrium and solution chemistry. New York: McGraw-Hill. ISBN 978-0-07-042647-4.
- Moeller, Therald (1980). Chemistry with Inorganic Qualitative Analysis. Academic Press. ISBN 978-0-12-503350-3.
- Moeller, Therald (1982). Inorganic Chemistry: A Modern Introduction. Wiley. ISBN 978-0-471-61230-8.
