= John Armstead Wood =

American Planetary Geologist (born 1932)

- Born: July 28, 1932 (age 94); Roanoke, Virginia, United States
- Education: Massachusetts Institute of Technology (Ph. D)
- Known for: Planetary geology
- Scientific career
- Fields: Planetary geologist, Astronomer
- Workplaces: Smithsonian Astrophysical Observatory, Harvard-Smithsonian Center for Astrophysics
- Doctoral advisor: Gordon J. F. MacDonald

John Armstead Wood (born 1932 in Virginia, United States) is an American astrophysicist. He earned his undergraduate degree from the Virginia Polytechnic Institute, and a doctorate from the Massachusetts Institute of Technology under Gordon J. F. MacDonald. He then joined the Smithsonian Astrophysical Observatory, which he retired from in 2004. He was elected to the American Academy of Arts and Sciences in 1992. The Hungaria-type asteroid (4736) Johnwood is named in his honor. His papers are archived with the Smithsonian Institution.

== Work ==
Wood's research involved the petrological study of chondritic meteorites towards an understanding of the origin of the Solar System. Wood analyzed lunar samples from the Apollo 11 mission. He presented his results at the first Lunar and Planetary Science Conference in 1970. In the course of his work, he developed models of the Moon's formation and its internal evolution. Wood was an investigator in the RADIG group that specified the entire workflow for the radar science data collected by the Magellan mission to Venus. Wood chaired the Committee on Planetary and Lunar Exploration (COMPLEX) from 1999-2002, under the Space Studies Board of the National Research Council.

== Literature ==
- "The Moon" (Vol. 233 No. 3 (September 1975), p. 92), "The Lunar Soil" (Vol. 223 No. 2 (August 1970), p. 14), and "Chrondrites and Chrondules" (Vol. 209 No. 4 (October 1963), p. 64) in Scientific American.
- Wood, John Armstead (1970). "Lunar Anorthosites". Science. 167 (3918): 602–604. Bibcode:1970Sci...167..602W. doi:10.1126/science.167.3918.602. PMID 17781512.

== Awards ==
- NASA Exceptional Scientific Achievement Medal in 1973.
- J. Lawrence Smith Medal from the National Academy of Sciences in 1976.
- Frederick C. Leonard Medal from The Meteoritical Society in 1978.
- G. K. Gilbert Award in 1992.
- Whipple Award in 2004.
