= Harry McSween =

American geologist

Harry Younger McSween Jr
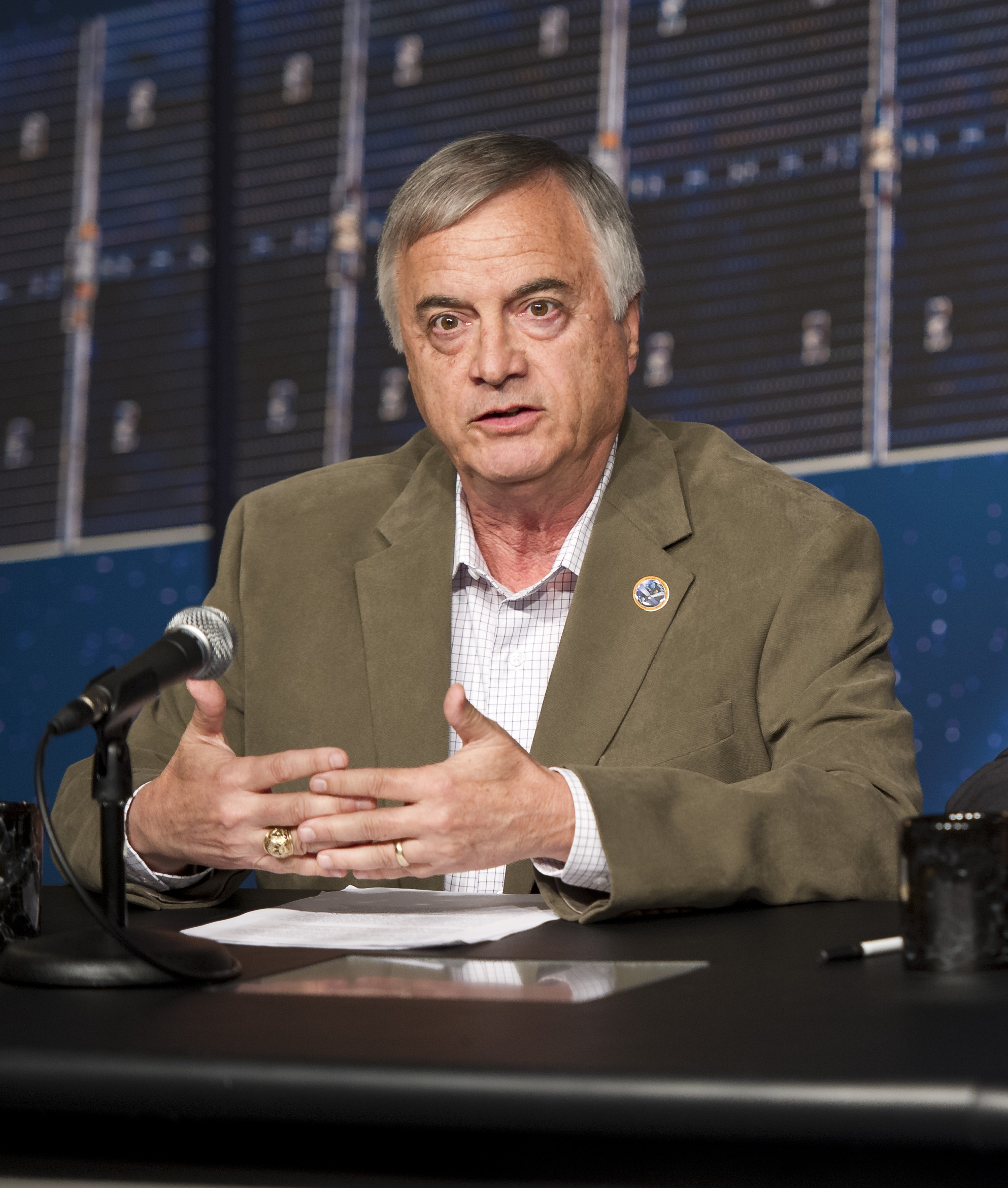
- McSween in 2012
- Born: September 29, 1945 (age 80); Charlotte, North Carolina
- Education: University of Georgia, Harvard
- Awards: Leonard Medal, Leconte Medal, J. Lawrence Smith Medal, Whipple Award
- Scientific career
- Fields: Meteoritics
- Workplaces: University of Tennessee at Knoxville
- Thesis: Petrologic and chemical studies of the (C3) carbonaceous meteorites (1977)
- Doctoral advisor: John A. Wood
- Website: eeps.utk.edu/person/harry-y-mcsween/

Harry "Hap" Younger McSween Jr. is Chancellor's Professor Emeritus of Planetary Geoscience at the University of Tennessee at Knoxville. He has published papers and popular books about meteorites and planetary exploration, and textbooks on geochemistry and cosmochemistry.

== Biography ==
McSween was born September 29, 1945, in Charlotte, North Carolina. After finishing school he attended The Citadel, where he graduated with a B.S. in chemistry in 1967. He then pursued an M.S. in geology at the University of Georgia, where he graduated in 1969. The title of his thesis was "Petrological and geochemical studies in the Coronaca area, Greenwood County, South Carolina". He then joined the Air Force where he was a pilot flying C-141 aircraft around the world.

After his military service he went on to Harvard, where he became John A. Wood's first graduate student. It was here that Edward Stolper and he came up with the idea that some meteorites might originate from Mars. After graduating with a PhD in 1977, he joined the faculty of the University of Tennessee. He became involved with the Mars Pathfinder mission in 1997 as a member of the science team, then on the team for Mars Global Surveyor. Since then McSween has been a co-investigator on the Mars Odyssey, Mars Exploration Rovers and Dawn asteroid orbiter missions.

McSween has been the elected President of the Meteoritical Society, Chair of the Planetary Division of the Geological Society of America, and Councilor and President of the Geological Society of America. He has also served on numerous advisory committees for NASA and the National Research Council. In 2021, McSween was elected into the membership of the National Academy of Sciences.

He has received the Leonard Medal from the Meteoritical Society, the Leconte Medal from the South Carolina Science Council, the J. Lawrence Smith Medal from the U.S. National Academy of Sciences, and the Whipple Award of the Planetary Science Division of the American Geophysical Union. In 2013, he was named the Southeastern Conference (SEC) Universities Professor of the Year.

McSween also has an asteroid named for him: 5223 McSween (1981 EX6).

== Publications ==
=== Books ===
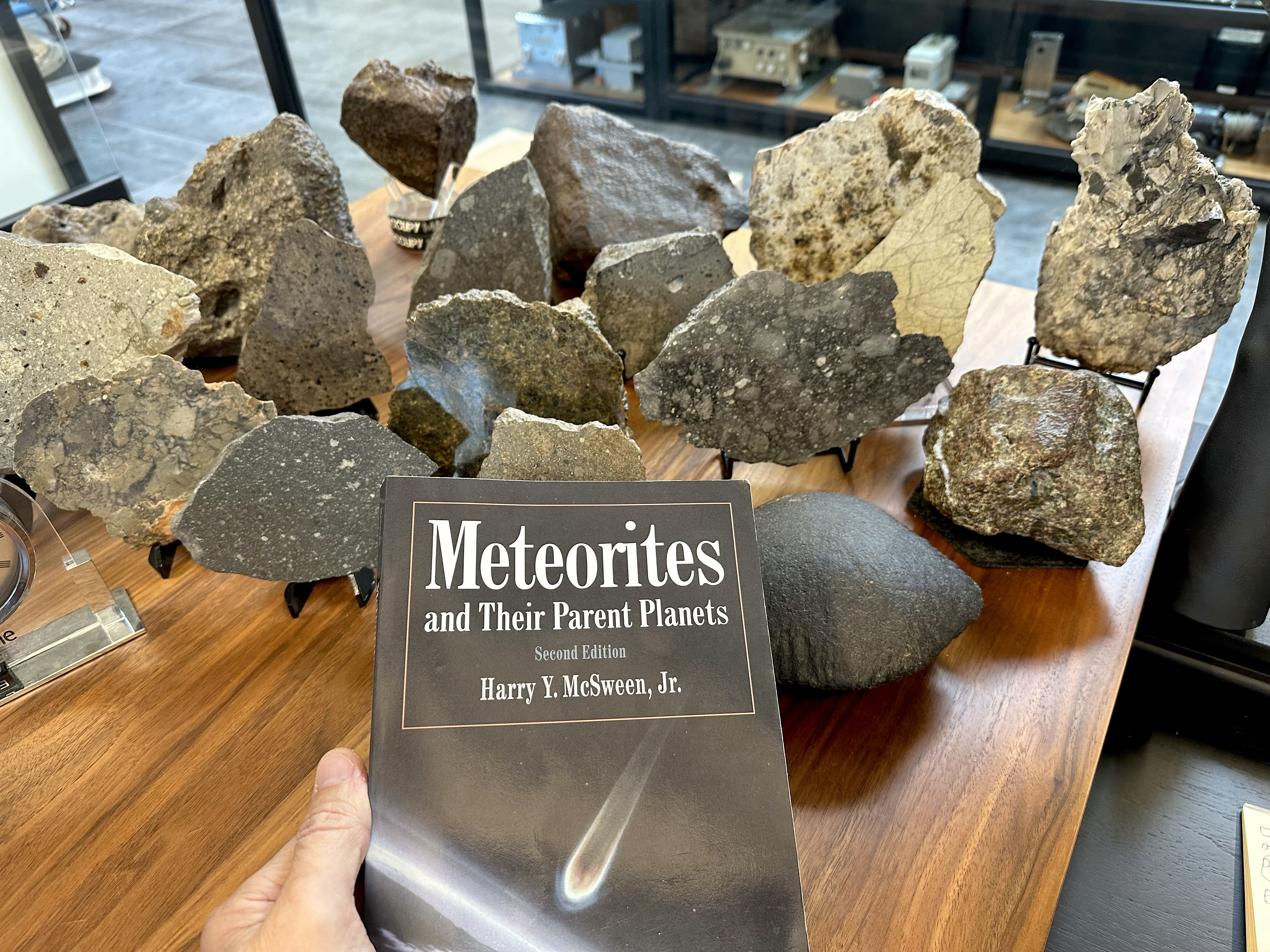
Meteorites and their Parent Planets in front of meteorites

- McSween, Harry Y. (1993). Stardust to planets: a geological tour of the solar system (1st ed.). New York: St. Martin's Press. ISBN 978-0-312-09394-5.
- McSween, Harry Y. (1997). Fanfare for Earth: The Origin of Our Planet and Life (1st ed.). New York: St. Martin's Press. ISBN 978-0-312-14601-6.
- McSween, Harry Y. (1999). Meteorites and their parent planets (2nd ed.). Cambridge [u.a.]: Cambridge University Press. ISBN 978-0-521-58303-9.
- McSween, Harry Y.; Richardson, Steven McAfee; Uhle, Maria E. (2003). Geochemistry: pathways and processes (2nd ed.). New York, NY [u.a.]: Columbia Univ. Press. ISBN 978-0-231-12440-9.
- D. S. Lauretta; H. Y. McSween, Jr., eds. (2006). Meteorites and the early solar system II. Tucson: University of Arizona Press. ISBN 978-0-8165-2562-1.
- Harry Y. McSween, Jr.; Gary R. Huss (2010). Cosmochemistry. Cambridge: Cambridge University Press. ISBN 978-0-521-87862-3.

=== Peer-reviewed journal articles ===
He is the author of over 300 peer-reviewed journal articles, of which the most cited are:

- "What we have learned about Mars from SNC meteorites", McSween Jr, H.Y. Meteoritics Volume 29, Issue 6, 1994, Pages 757-779
- "The chemical composition of martian soil and rocks returned by the mobile alpha proton x-ray spectrometer: Preliminary results from the x-ray mode", Rieder, R.a, Economou, T., Wänke, H., Turkevich, A., Crisp, J.c, Brückner, J., Dreibus, G., McSween Jr., H.Y. Science Volume 278, Issue 5344, December 5, 1997, Pages 1771-1774.

== See also ==
- Glossary of meteoritics
