= Buseck Center for Meteorite Studies =

Arizona State University research center

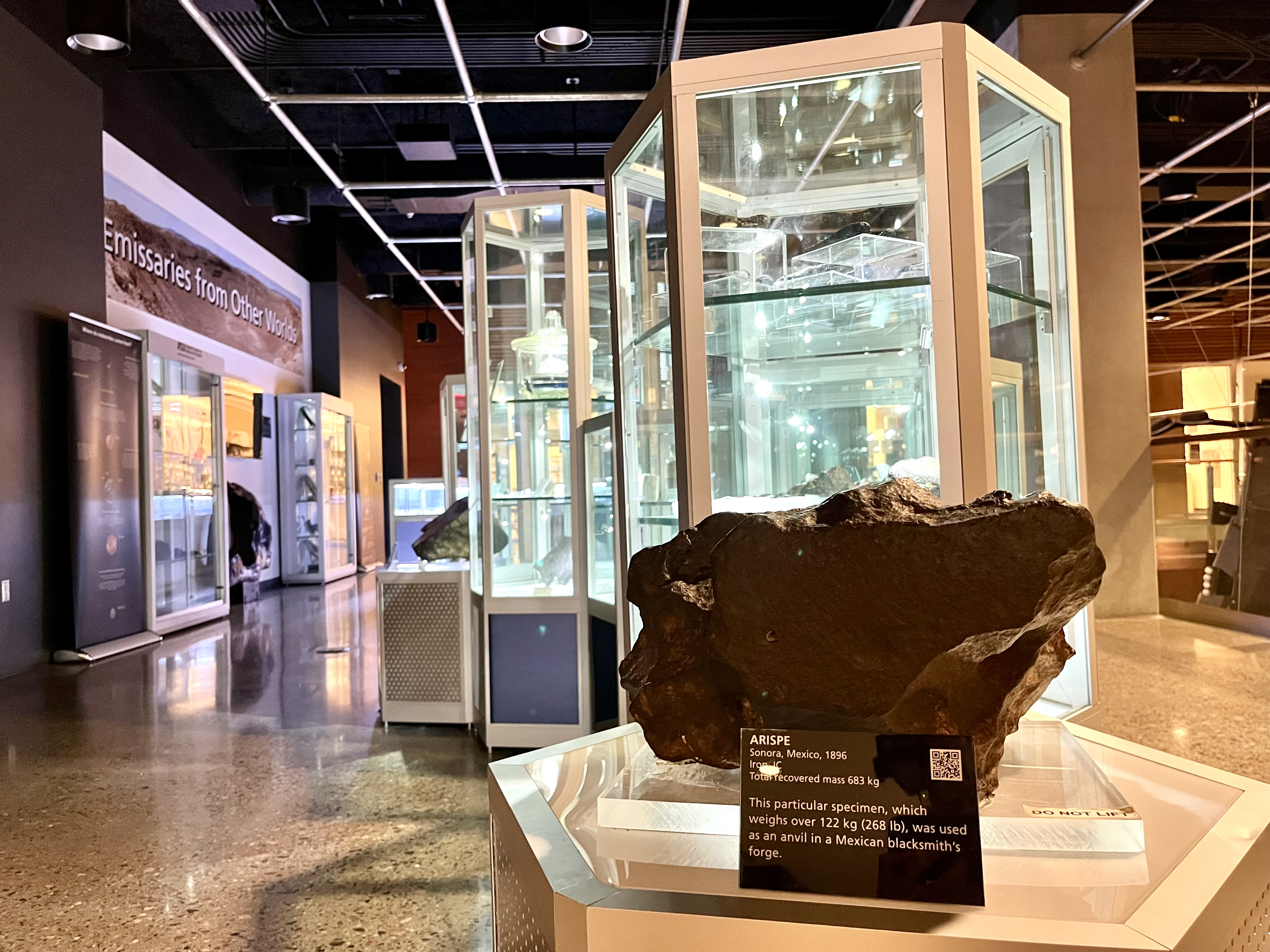
The Meteorite Studies Showroom

The Buseck Center for Meteorite Studies was founded in 1960, on the Tempe Campus of Arizona State University, and houses the world's largest university-based meteorite collection. The collection contains specimens from over 1,600 separate meteorite falls and finds, and is actively used internationally for planetary, geological and space science research. The Center also operates a meteorite museum which is open to the public.

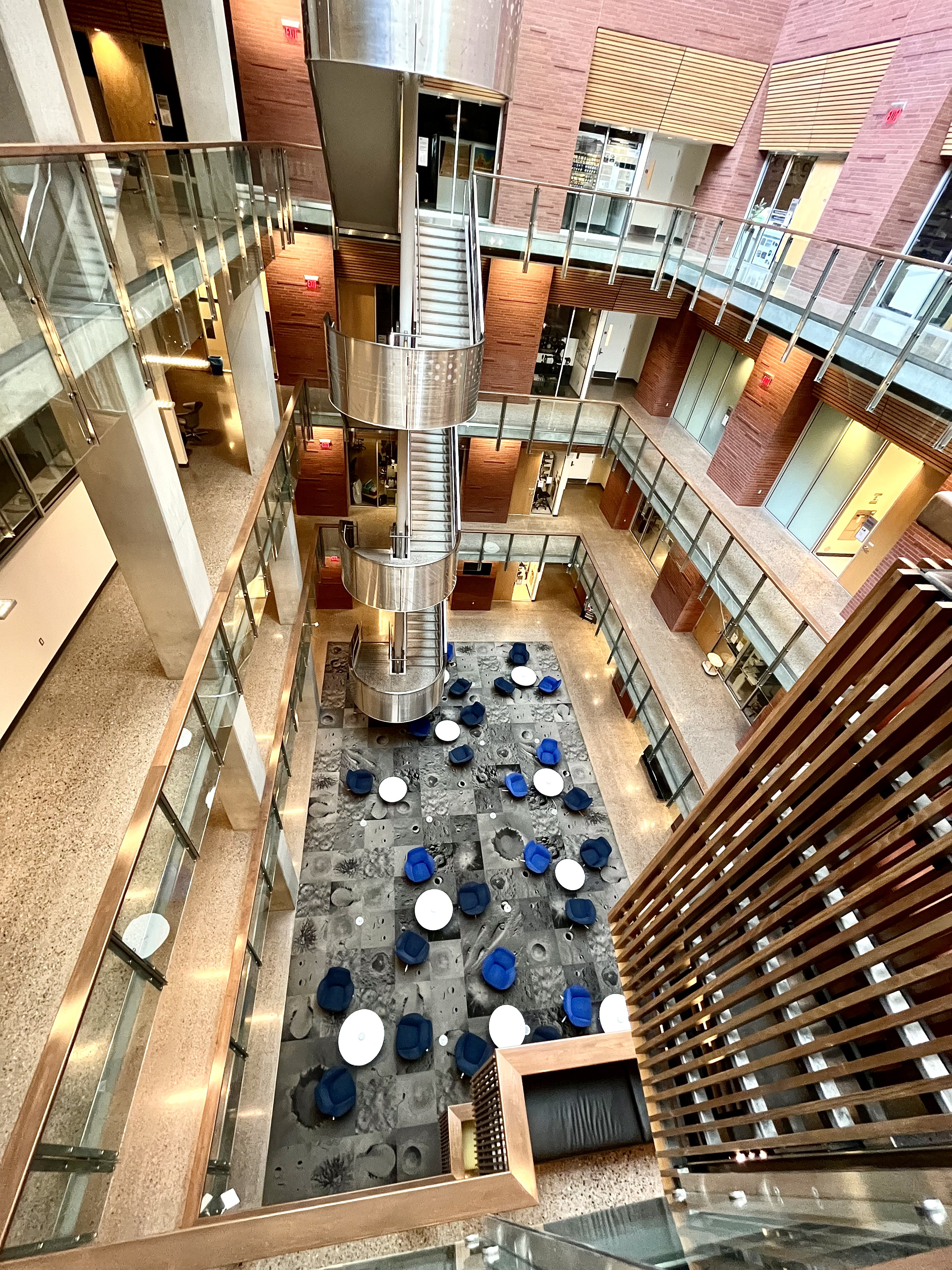
'The Crater Carpet'

In 2021, the Center for Meteorite Studies was named in honor of Professor Peter R. Buseck.

== See also ==
- Nininger Meteorite Award
- Harvey H. Nininger
- Carleton B. Moore

== Sources and external links ==
- Center for Meteorite Studies official website
- ASU Museums: Center for Meteorite Studies
- Map: 33°25′16″N 111°55′55″W
