= Michael James Gaffey =

American planetary scientist (1945–2026)

Michael J. Gaffey
- Born: December 1, 1945; Meadville, Pennsylvania, U.S.
- Died: September 20, 2026 (aged 80)
- Education: University of Iowa, Massachusetts Institute of Technology
- Awards: G.K. Gilbert Award, Leonard Medal
- Scientific career
- Fields: Planetary science
- Workplaces: University of Hawaiʻi Institute for Astronomy; Hawaii Institute of Geophysics; Rensselaer Polytechnic Institute; University of North Dakota
- Website: space.edu

Michael James Gaffey (December 1, 1945 – September 20, 2026) was an American planetary scientist who specialized in deriving the mineralogies of asteroids from their reflectance spectra.

== Life and career ==
Michael James Gaffey was born on December 1, 1945. He received his bachelor's and master's degrees in geology from the University of Iowa and his PhD from Massachusetts Institute of Technology in planetary science graduating in 1974. From 1974 to 1977, he worked as a Post-doc in the Planetary Astronomy Laboratory at Massachusetts Institute of Technology. After leaving Massachusetts Institute of Technology, he worked as a researcher at the Institute for Astronomy of the University of Hawaiʻi from 1977 to 1979 and the Hawaii Institute of Geophysics from 1979 to 1984. From 1984 to 2001, he taught in the geology department of the Rensselaer Polytechnic Institute. He was latterly a professor at the University of North Dakota in the Space Studies department.

Gaffey died on September 20, 2026, at the age of 80.

== Honors ==
In 2006 he received both the Leonard Medal from the Meteoritical Society and the G. K. Gilbert Award from the Planetary Science division of the Geological Society of America. Asteroid 3545 Gaffey is also named in his honor.
