= Klaus Keil =

American mineralogist (1934–2022)

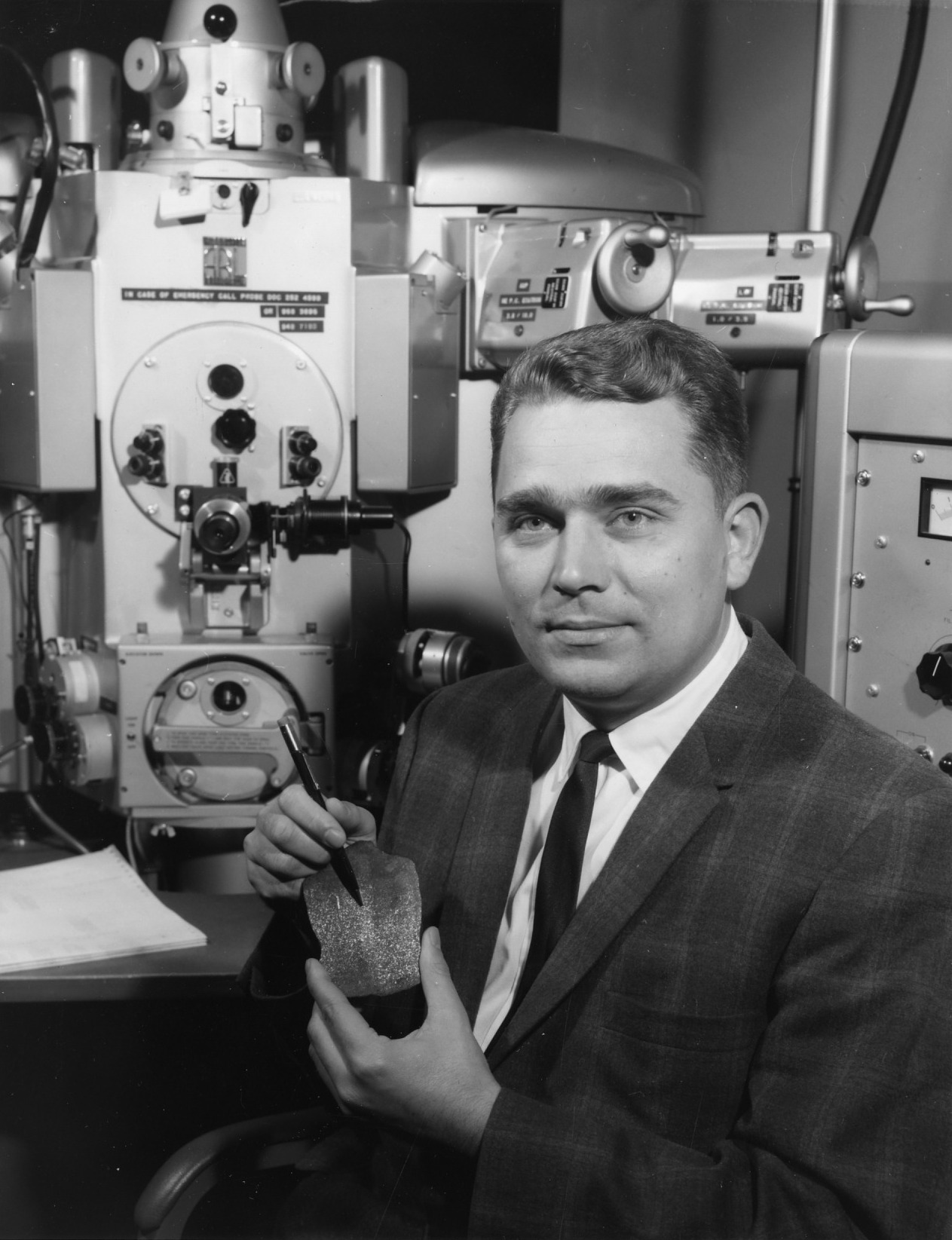
- Dr. Klaus Keil (b. 1934), research scientist at NASA's Ames Research Center, shown at the Center's electron microprobe with a sample of meteorite.
- Born: November 15, 1934; Hamburg, Germany
- Died: February 25, 2022 (aged 87)
- Awards: Leonard Medal; J. Lawrence Smith Medal
- Scientific career
- Fields: Meteoritics
- Workplaces: University of Hawaiʻi at Mānoa; Hawaiʻi Institute of Geophysics and Planetology; University of New Mexico Institute of Meteoritics

Klaus Keil (November 15, 1934 – February 25, 2022) was a professor at the School of Ocean and Earth Science and Technology (SOEST) at the University of Hawaiʻi at Mānoa. He was the former Director of the Hawaiʻi Institute of Geophysics and Planetology. He was also the former director of the University of New Mexico Institute of Meteoritics. Keil pioneered the use of the electron microprobe to study meteorite samples. He was one of the co-inventors of the energy dispersive X-ray spectrometer.

In 1988, Keil won the Leonard Medal, which is awarded by the Meteoritical Society. In 2006, he won the J. Lawrence Smith Medal, which is awarded by the National Academy of Sciences. These awards are for his pioneering quantitative studies of minerals in meteorites and important contributions to understanding the nature, origin, and evolution of their parent bodies.

Asteroid 5054 Keil and the mineral keilite are named after him.

Keil is the father of professional tennis players Mark Keil and Kathrin Keil.

Keil was the president of the Meteoritical Society from 1969-1970.

Keil died of cancer in 2022, after a long battle with the disease.

== See also ==
- Glossary of meteoritics
