= François Robert =

French geochemist (born 1951)

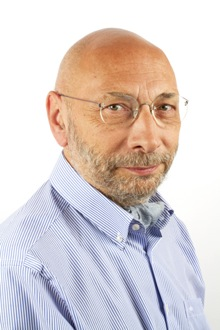
- Robert in 2010
- Born: 26 January 1951 (age 75); Paris, France
- Known for: Cosmochemistry, and Geochemistry of chondrites, of planets, of comets, Precambrian hydrosphere Theory of fractionation of stable isotopes
- Awards: Médaille d'argent du CNRS; Leonard Medal
- Scientific career
- Fields: Isotopic geology and Cosmochemistry
- Institutions: CNRS - MNHN

François Robert, born in Paris, France the 26th of January, 1951, is a French researcher specializing in isotope geochemistry and cosmochemistry. His work on the isotopes of hydrogen has enhanced the understanding of the origin of water and of organic matter in the Solar System. He is famous for his work on lithium, beryllium and boron, light elements formed by the irradiation of interstellar matter. He received a Leonard Medal from the Meteoritical Society in 2011 for his work on the isotopic composition of stable nuclei.

== Career ==
He began his thesis in 1975 in the CEA Saclay under the direction of Marc Javoy and Liliane Merlivat and edited by Samuel Epstein at Caltech, Pasadena, California. He joined the CNRS in 1980 at the Laboratory of stable isotope geochemistry at the University of Jussieu, where he defended his thesis on the isotopic compositions (H, C, N) of carbonaceous meteorites in 1982. Between 1983 and 1990, he worked successively with Liliane Merlivat in Saclay, Samuel Epstein at the California Institute of Technology and Marc Javoy at Jussieu.

In 1990 he became a Directeur de Recherche in the CNRS.

In 1992 he worked for a few months in Thiruvananthapuram, India, where he created a laboratory for isotopic analysis.

He was assigned in 1993 to the Laboratory of Mineralogy of the National Museum of Natural History (MNHN) led by Professor Jacques Fabriès. Between 1993 and 2004, he collaborated with the Research Center for Petrology and Geochemistry in Nancy (CNRS / INPL). Under the leadership of Professor Stephen Roth he participated in the establishment of the French Society for Stable Isotopes of which he became the Senior Vice President in 1999.

In 1999, he undertook the determination of the molecular structure of the insoluble organic matter of meteorites in collaboration with the Laboratory of Organic and Inorganic Geochemistry of the Environment at the University Pierre et Marie Curie in Paris.

In 2006, he became responsible for a consortium of French laboratories set up by CNES, which set itself the goal of analysis of samples from the halo of Comet Wild 2 captured by the U.S. Stardust space mission (NASA).

Between 2003 and 2011, he was successively elected member of the board of directors and the scientific council of the MNHN and chairman of the National Program of Planetology (PNP / CNRS-INSU). Since 2004 he has been Director of the Laboratory of Mineralogy and Cosmochemistry of the Museum, in which there is a NanoSims (Cameca) ion probe accessible to national and international researchers as part of the National Analysis Service of the INSU-CNRS.
