= Gerald J. Wasserburg =

American geologist (1927–2016)

Gerald J Wasserburg
- Born: Gerald Joseph Wasserburg; March 25, 1927; New Brunswick, New Jersey, US
- Died: June 13, 2016 (aged 89)
- Education: University of Chicago
- Awards: Arthur L. Day Medal (1970); NASA Distinguished Public Service Medal (1972 and twice 1978); V. M. Goldschmidt Award (1978); Wollaston Medal (1985); Crafoord Prize (1986); Arthur Holmes Medal (1987); Gold Medal of the Royal Astronomical Society (1991); William Bowie Medal (2008)
- Scientific career
- Fields: geophysics astronomy geology astrophysics chemistry
- Doctoral advisor: Harold C. Urey and Mark Inghram

Gerald J. Wasserburg (March 25, 1927 – June 13, 2016) was an American geologist. At the time of his death, he was the John D. MacArthur Professor of Geology and Geophysics, emeritus, at the California Institute of Technology. He was known for his work in the fields of isotope geochemistry, cosmochemistry, meteoritics, and astrophysics.

== Early life and education ==
Wasserburg was raised in a Jewish family in New Brunswick, New Jersey during the Great Depression. At age fifteen, he dropped out of high school and forged his birth certificate to meet the U.S. Army age minimum for enlistment. Following his military service, for which he received the Combat Infantryman Badge and the Purple Heart for combat in the European theatre of World War II, he graduated from high school and attended college on the G.I. Bill. Wasserburg completed his Ph.D. from the University of Chicago in 1954, with a thesis on the development of K–Ar dating, done under the sponsorship of Harold Urey and Mark Inghram.

== Career ==
=== Academia ===
He joined the faculty at Caltech in 1955 as assistant professor. He became associate professor in 1959 and professor of geology and geophysics in 1962. In 1982 he became the John D. MacArthur Professor of Geology and Geophysics; he retired in 2001. He, Typhoon Lee and D.A. Papanastassiou discovered the presence of short-lived radioactive ^{26}Al in the early Solar System and short-lived ^{107}Pd with William R. Kelly.

=== Apollo Program ===
Wasserburg was deeply involved in the Apollo Program with the returned Lunar samples, including being a member of the so-called "Four Horsemen", along with Bob Walker, Jim Arnold, and Paul Werner Gast. He pioneered the precise measurement of ultra-small samples under strict clean room conditions with minimal contamination. He was the co-inventor of the Lunatic Spectrometer (the first fully digital mass spectrometer with computer-controlled magnetic field scanning and rapid switching) and founder of the "Lunatic Asylum" research laboratory at Caltech specializing in high precision, high sensitivity isotopic analyses of meteorites, lunar and terrestrial samples. He and his co-workers were major contributors to establishing a chronology for the Moon and proposed the hypothesis of the Late Heavy Bombardment (LHB) of the whole inner Solar System at near 4.0 Gy ago (with F. Tera, D. A. Papanastassiou).

== Impact of research ==
Wasserburg's research led to a better understanding of the origins and history of the Solar System and its component bodies and the precursor stellar sources contributing to the Solar System; this research established a time scale for the development of the early Solar System, including the processes of nucleosynthesis and the formation and evolution of the planets, the Moon and the meteorites. More recently, he investigated models of the chemical evolution of the Galaxy.

== Organizational affiliations and legacy ==
He was a member of the U.S. National Academy of Sciences, the American Philosophical Society, the American Academy of Arts and Sciences, and the Norwegian Academy of Science and Letters. He won the Arthur L. Day Medal in 1970, the NASA Distinguished Public Service Medal in 1972 and 1978, the Wollaston Medal in 1985, the Gold Medal of the Royal Astronomical Society in 1991 and the Bowie Medal in 2008. He was co-winner, with Claude Allègre, of the Crafoord Prize in Geosciences in 1986. The Crafoord Prize, awarded by the Royal Swedish Academy of Sciences, is often described as a Nobel-equivalent award for disciplines not recognized by the Nobel Prizes. He was the recipient of several honorary degrees. He was recipient of the J.F.Kemp Medal with Paul W. Gast Columbia Univ 1973, the H. Hess Medal of the American Geophysical Union in 1985, the Leonard Medal of the Meteoritical Soc. 1975, the J.Lawrence Smith Medal of the National Academy of Science 1985, the Arthur L. Day Prize & Lectureship of the National Academy of Science 1981, the Holmes Medal of the European Union of Geosciences in 1986 and the V. M. Goldschmidt medal of the Geochemical society in 1978.

Minor planet 4765 Wasserburg is named in his honor.

== Family ==
He is survived by his sons Charles and Daniel Wasserburg, as well his grandchildren Ori, Philip, Roscoe and Ben Wasserburg.
