= Tijana Rajh =

Serbian scientist and academic

- Born: Belgrade, Yugoslavia today Serbia
- Education: University of Belgrade
- Scientific career
- Workplaces: Argonne National Laboratory; Arizona State University

Tijana Rajh (Serbian: Тијана Рајх; born 1957) is an American materials scientist who is a professor and director of the Arizona State University School of Molecular Sciences. Her research considers the development of nanomaterials and materials for quantum technologies. She was awarded the Association for Women in Science Innovator Award in 2009, and named a Fellow of the American Association for the Advancement of Science in 2014.

== Early life and education ==
Rajh was born in 1957, Belgrade, former Yugoslavia in a Serbo - Jewish family. Her father Zdenko Rajh (Reich, 1905–1990) was a publicist and lawyer, and her mother Gordana Nikolić Rajh was a linguist. Despite being interested in Aristotle, Rajh became fascinated by better understanding the natural world. She completed her undergraduate and graduate degrees at the University of Belgrade, where she specialized in physical chemistry. After earning her doctorate, Rajh worked in solar energy research between National Renewable Energy Laboratory and the Boris Kidrič Institute in Belgrade, where she worked on photo-electrochemistry and semiconductors.

== Research and career ==
Rajh worked at the Argonne National Laboratory, where she was eventually made an Argonne Distinguished Fellow. She worked on semiconducting nanocrystals for water splitting and electrochemistry. In particular, Rajh worked on the synthesis of the nanocrystals, and developed strategies to assemble them. She developed electron paramagnetic spectroscopy and other electron resonance techniques to understand spin effects during electron transfer. In 2009, she was awarded the Association for Women in Science Innovator Award, and she was named an American Association for the Advancement of Science Fellow in 2014.

Alongside her work on nanomaterials, Rajh developed quantum-enabled strategies for sensing. She showed that the high surface areas of metal–organic frameworks could be used to maximize sensitivity, permitting quantitive analysis using electron paramagnetic resonance. She has proposed that carbon nanotubes with highly confined electron spins could be used as qubits with record long coherence times.

In 2021, Rajh was named Director of the Arizona State University School of Molecular Sciences.

== Selected publications ==
- Dong-Hyun Kim; Elena A Rozhkova; Ilya V Ulasov; Samuel D Bader; Tijana Rajh; Maciej S Lesniak; Valentyn Novosad (29 November 2009). "Biofunctionalized magnetic-vortex microdiscs for targeted cancer-cell destruction". Nature Materials. 9 (2): 165–171. doi:10.1038/nmat2591. ISSN 1476-1122. PMC 2810356. PMID 19946279. Wikidata Q30492872.
- Tijana Rajh; Olga I. Micic; Arthur J. Nozik (November 1993). "Synthesis and characterization of surface-modified colloidal cadmium telluride quantum dots". The journal of physical chemistry. 97 (46): 11999–12003. doi:10.1021/j100148a026. ISSN 0022-3654. Wikidata Q57257789.
- Deanna C Hurum; Kimberly A Gray; Tijana Rajh; Marion C Thurnauer (1 January 2005). "Recombination pathways in the Degussa P25 formulation of TiO2: surface versus lattice mechanisms". The Journal of Physical Chemistry B. 109 (2): 977–980. doi:10.1021/jp045395d. ISSN 1520-6106. PMID 16866468. Wikidata Q40304020.
