= Katharina Lodders =

German-American planetary scientist and cosmochemist

Katharina Lodders is a German-American planetary scientist and cosmochemist who works as a research professor in the Department of Earth and Planetary Sciences at Washington University in St. Louis, where she co-directs the Planetary Chemistry Laboratory. Her research concerns the chemical composition of solar and stellar environments, including the atmospheres of planets, exoplanets, and brown dwarfs, and the study of the temperatures at which elements condense in stellar environments.

== Education and career ==
Lodders completed her doctorate in 1991 at the University of Mainz, with research on the cosmochemistry of trace elements performed at the Max Planck Institute for Chemistry. She joined Washington University in St. Louis as a postdoctoral researcher in 1992 before continuing there as a research professor.

She served as a program director for galactic astronomy at the National Science Foundation from 2010 to 2013.

== Books ==
Lodders is the coauthor of books including:

- The Planetary Scientist's Companion (with Bruce Fegley, Jr., Oxford University Press, 1998)
- Chemistry of the Solar System (with Bruce Fegley, Jr., Royal Society of Chemistry, 2010)

== Recognition ==
Lodders won the 2021 Leonard Medal of The Meteoritical Society, its highest award, "for her work on the condensation of presolar grains in stellar atmospheres and her compilation of the Solar System Abundances of the Elements and the condensation temperatures of the elements".
