= Joseph I. Goldstein =

American engineer and academic

Joe Goldstein
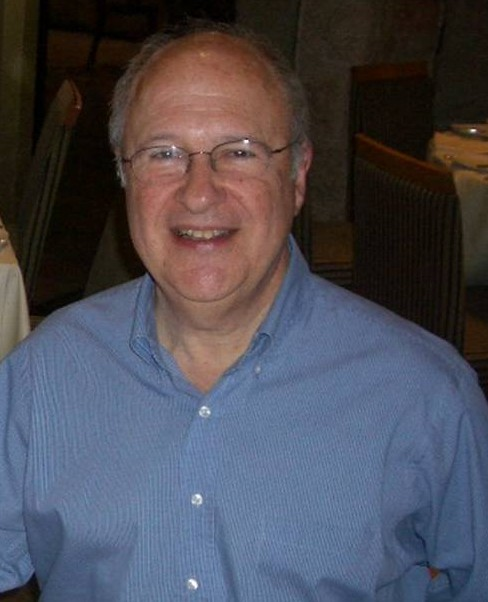
- Born: January 6, 1939; Syracuse, New York, U.S.
- Died: June 27, 2015 (aged 76)
- Education: Massachusetts Institute of Technology
- Awards: Henry Clifton Sorby Award, Leonard Medal
- Scientific career
- Fields: materials science, mechanical engineering
- Workplaces: University of Massachusetts Amherst; Lehigh University; University of Cambridge; University of Massachusetts Amherst
- Thesis: (1964)
- Doctoral advisor: R. Ogilvie

Joseph Irwin Goldstein (January 6, 1939 – June 27, 2015) was an American scientist and engineer, working mainly in the fields of materials science and mechanical engineering. He was a Professor of Mechanical Engineering and emeritus Dean of Engineering at the University of Massachusetts Amherst. His research into the nature of outer-space materials led to the naming of an asteroid after him in 2000, 4989 Joegoldstein.

His early research was at MIT, where he received a B.S. in 1960, an S.M. in 1962 and an Sc.D. in 1964.

From 1964 to 1983, Goldstein was a professor of Materials Science and Engineering at Lehigh University. During a sabbatical year in 1975, Goldstein discovered that analytical electron microscopy could resolve the solute profiles in synthetic meteoritic materials. He used the technique of AEM to supplement his extensive Scanning Electron Microscopy techniques. He initiated the Lehigh University Summer Microscopy School in 1970 and these continue today, teaching both SEM and AEM microprobe techniques. Goldstein was the lead author, in collaboration with several fellow LUSMS faculty members, of four editions of Scanning Electron Microscopy and X-Ray Microanalysis. The text is used worldwide in electron microscopy seminars and graduate courses.

In 1983, Goldstein became Vice President for Graduate Studies and Research at Lehigh.

In 1990, Goldstein moved to UMass to become Dean of Engineering, a position he held until 2004.

In 1999 he received the Henry Clifton Sorby Award of the International Metallographic Society.

The asteroid 4989 Joegoldstein was named after Goldstein in 2000 by Schelte J. Bus, who had discovered the asteroid in 1981 at the Anglo-Australian Telescope. It was named in honor of Goldstein because of his outstanding contributions to the science of meteoritics.

In 2005 he received the highest award of the Meteoritical Society, the Leonard Medal, for work on metal, phosphide, carbide, and sulphide in meteorites and lunar rocks; the formation of the Widmanstätten pattern and the determination of cooling rates in irons, stony-irons, and chondrites; the nature of plessite and martensite formation; and determinations of phase diagrams for the Fe-Ni, Fe-Ni-P, Fe-Ni-Co, Fe-Ni-C, and Fe-Ni-S systems
