= Krinovite =

Triclinic meteorite mineral

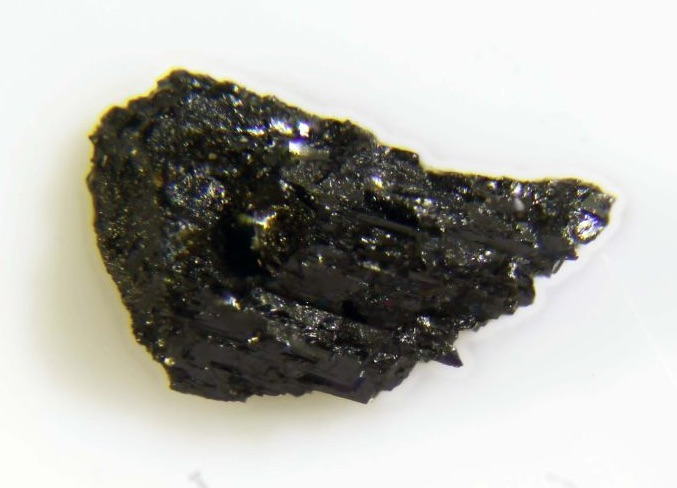

General
- Category: Minerals
- Formula: NaMg_{2}CrSi_{3}O_{10}
- IMA symbol: Kvi

Identification
- Formula mass: 367.85 gm
- Color: Emerald green
- Cleavage: None observed
- Mohs scale hardness: 5½ - 7
- Luster: Sub-Adamantine
- Streak: Greenish white
- Diaphaneity: Subtranslucent to opaque
- Density: 3.38

Krinovite (pronounced kreen'-off-ite) is an emerald-green triclinic meteorite mineral, containing chromium, magnesium, oxygen, silicon, and sodium, of the aenigmatite group. "It has been discovered within graphite nodules in three iron meteorites," specifically the Canyon Diablo, Wichita County, and Youndegin meteorites. It was named in honour of Evgeny Leonidovich Krinov, Russian investigator of meteorites. It is a decaoxotrisilicate in the sorosilicate subclass.
