= Harvey H. Nininger =

American lay scientist (1887–1986)

- Born: Harvey Harlow Nininger; January 17, 1887; Conway Springs, Kansas
- Died: March 1, 1986 (aged 99); Westminster, Colorado
- Known for: Revived interest in the scientific study of meteorites in the 1930s
- Notable work: Assembled the largest personal collection of meteorites up to his time. Founded the American Meteorite Museum (1942–1960).
- Spouse: Addie N. (Delp) Nininger

Harvey Harlow Nininger (January 17, 1887 – March 1, 1986) was an American meteoriticist and educator. Although he was self-taught, he revived interest in scientific study of meteorites in the 1930s and assembled the largest personal collection of meteorites up to that time.

Nininger Meteorite Museum, Sedona, Arizona, c. 1954

In 1942 Nininger founded the American Meteorite Museum, which was first located near Meteor Crater, Arizona (1942–1953), then in Sedona, Arizona (1953–1960).

Part of the Nininger Collection was sold to the British Museum in 1958, and the remainder of the collection was sold to the Arizona State University Center for Meteorite Studies in 1960 which displays a selection of these meteorites in their public museum.

== History ==
While based in Denver, Colorado, Nininger published the first edition of a pamphlet titled "A Comet Strikes the Earth", which described how Meteor Crater formed when an asteroid impacted the Earth. In 1942, Harvey Nininger moved his home and business from Denver to the Meteor Crater Observatory, located near the turn-off for Meteor Crater on Route 66. He renamed the building the "American Meteorite Museum" and published a number of meteorite and Meteor Crater-related books from the location. He also conducted a wide range of research at the crater, discovering impactite, iron-nickel spherules related to the impact and vaporization of the asteroid, and the presence of many features still unique to the crater, such as half-melted slugs of meteoric iron mixed with melted target rock. Nininger's discoveries were compiled and published in a seminal work, Arizona's Meteorite Crater (1956). Nininger's extensive sampling and fieldwork in the 1930s and 40s contributed significantly to the scientific community's acceptance of the idea that Meteor Crater formed by the impact of an asteroid.

Harvey Nininger believed that the crater should be nationalized, and in 1948, successfully petitioned the American Astronomical Society to pass a motion in support. The Barringer family promptly terminated his exploration rights and ability to conduct further fieldwork at the crater. To this day, Nininger is omitted from any display or reference at the privately owned museum located on the crater rim.

Fletcher Watson of Harvard University in his book Between The Planets (1941) writes that Nininger was accounting for half of all the meteorite discoveries in the world at that time. In his career, Nininger published some 162 scientific papers and four books relating to meteorites.

Over the years I delivered hundreds of lectures throughout the nation in colleges and universities, ...in elementary and secondary schools... I spoke on street corners, in country schools, in the Carnegie Music Hall...

It was a source of some chagrin to be introduced, as I was frequently, as "the man who has found more meteorites than any other man in history."

Such a statement missed the main point of my life. Collecting occupied much of my time and effort, but collecting served as a sort of platform or footing on which to stand while I sought to educate, and while I pleaded constantly for an organized program of meteoritical research.

Nininger's career as a self-taught and self-financed meteorite scientist and collector was unique. He lived to see meteoritics receive serious attention in the earth and space sciences, as he had urged for forty years. Nininger is considered by many today to be the father of modern meteoritics, having recovered a substantial portion of the meteorites available to scientists today as well as bringing to attention the fact that meteorites are present in great enough concentrations on Earth's surface to actually warrant looking for. Before Nininger actively pursued his meteorite hunting endeavors, many scientists regarded it as a folly to spend one's time doing so, believing meteorites to be so uncommon as to render searching for them a complete waste of time.

In 1965, Nininger and his wife endowed the Nininger Meteorite Award, awarded annually by the Center for Meteorite Studies at Arizona State University.

== See also ==
- Meteorite
- Glossary of meteoritics
