= Richard B. Frankel =

American retired physicist

Richard B. Frankel is an Emeritus Professor of Physics at the California State Polytechnic University, San Luis Obispo. He is noted for his research on magnetotaxis and biomineralization of magnetic iron minerals in general and magnetotactic bacteria in particular. His expertise in the latter was prominently discussed in Stephen Jay Gould's The Panda's Thumb (1980 Chapter 30). He is a graduate of the University of Missouri (1961) and took a PhD from Berkeley (1965). Much of his career was spent at the Francis Bitter National Magnet Laboratory, Massachusetts Institute of Technology before joining Cal Poly in 1988.

He is a fellow of the American Physical Society.

== Selected publications ==
- —; Blum, N.; Foner, S.; Freeman, A.; Schieber, M. (1965). "Ferrimagnetic Structure of Magnetoelectric Ga_{2−x}Fe_{_{x}}O_{_{3}}". Physical Review Letters. 15 (25): 958–960. Bibcode:1965PhRvL..15..958F. doi:10.1103/PhysRevLett.15.958.
- —; Blum, N.; Schwartz, Brian; Kim, Duk (1967). "Mössbauer Evidence for a Spin-Compensated State in Dilute Fe-Cu Alloys". Physical Review Letters. 18 (24): 1051–1053. Bibcode:1967PhRvL..18.1051F. doi:10.1103/PhysRevLett.18.1051.
- Chappert, J.; — (1967). "Mössbauer Study of Ferrimagnetic Ordering in Nickel Ferrite and Chromium-Substituted Nickel Ferrite". Physical Review Letters. 19 (10): 570–572. Bibcode:1967PhRvL..19..570C. doi:10.1103/PhysRevLett.19.570.
- Mayerle, J. J.; —; R. H. Holm; James A. Ibers; W. D. Phillips; J. F. Weiher (1973). "Synthetic Analogs of the Active Sites of Iron-Sulfur Proteins. Structure and Properties of Bis [o-xylyldithiolato-μ_{2}-sulfidoferrate(III)], an Analog of the 2Fe-2S Proteins". Proceedings of the National Academy of Sciences. 70 (8): 2429–2433. Bibcode:1973PNAS...70.2429M. doi:10.1073/pnas.70.8.2429. PMC 433750. PMID 4525429.
- Laskowski, E. J.; —; Gillum, W. O.; Papaefthymiou, G. C.; Renaud, J.; Ibers, James A.; Holm, R. H. (1978). "Synthetic analogs of the 4-Fe active sites of reduced ferredoxins. Electronic properties of the tetranuclear trianions [Fe_{4}S_{4}(SR)_{4}]^{3−} and the structure of [(C_{2}H_{5})_{3}(CH_{3})N]_{3}[Fe_{4}S_{4}(SC_{6}H_{5})_{4}]". Journal of the American Chemical Society. 100 (17): 5322–5337. doi:10.1021/ja00485a013.
- —; Richard P. Blakemore; Ralph S. Wolfe (1979). "Magnetite in Freshwater Magnetotactic Bacteria". Science. 203 (4387): 1355–1356. Bibcode:1979Sci...203.1355F. doi:10.1126/science.203.4387.1355. PMID 17780480. S2CID 15930729.
- —; Papaefthymiou, Georgia C.; Blakemore, Richard P.; O'Brien, Wendy (1983). "Fe_{3}O_{4} precipitation in magnetotactic bacteria". Biochimica et Biophysica Acta (BBA) - Molecular Cell Research. 763 (2): 147–159. doi:10.1016/0167-4889(83)90038-1.
- Bazylinski, Dennis A.; —; Jannasch, Holger W. (1988). "Anaerobic magnetite production by a marine, magnetotactic bacterium". Nature. 334 (6182): 518–519. Bibcode:1988Natur.334..518B. doi:10.1038/334518a0. S2CID 4355713.
- Moskowitz, Bruce M.; —; Bazylinski, Dennis A. (1993). "Rock magnetic criteria for the detection of biogenic magnetite". Earth and Planetary Science Letters. 120 (3–4): 283–300. Bibcode:1993E&PSL.120..283M. doi:10.1016/0012-821X(93)90245-5.
- —; D. A. Bazylinski; M. S. Johnson; B. L. Taylor (1997). "Magneto-aerotaxis in marine coccoid bacteria". Biophysical Journal. 73 (2): 994–1000. Bibcode:1997BpJ....73..994F. doi:10.1016/S0006-3495(97)78132-3. PMC 1180996. PMID 9251816.
- Bazylinski, Dennis A.; — (2004). "Magnetosome formation in prokaryotes". Nature Reviews Microbiology. 2 (3): 217–230. doi:10.1038/nrmicro842. PMID 15083157. S2CID 6803811.

== Other sources ==
- Fisher, Arthur (April 1980). "The magnetism of a shared facility" (PDF). MOSAIC. 11 (2). National Science Foundation: 45.
- Mielczarek, Eugene Vorburger; Sharon Bertsch McGrayne (2000). Iron, Nature's Universal Element: Why People Need Iron & Animals Make Magnets. Rutgers University Press. pp. 49–63. ISBN 9780813528311.
