= Meteoritics =

Scientific study of meteors, meteorites and meteoroids

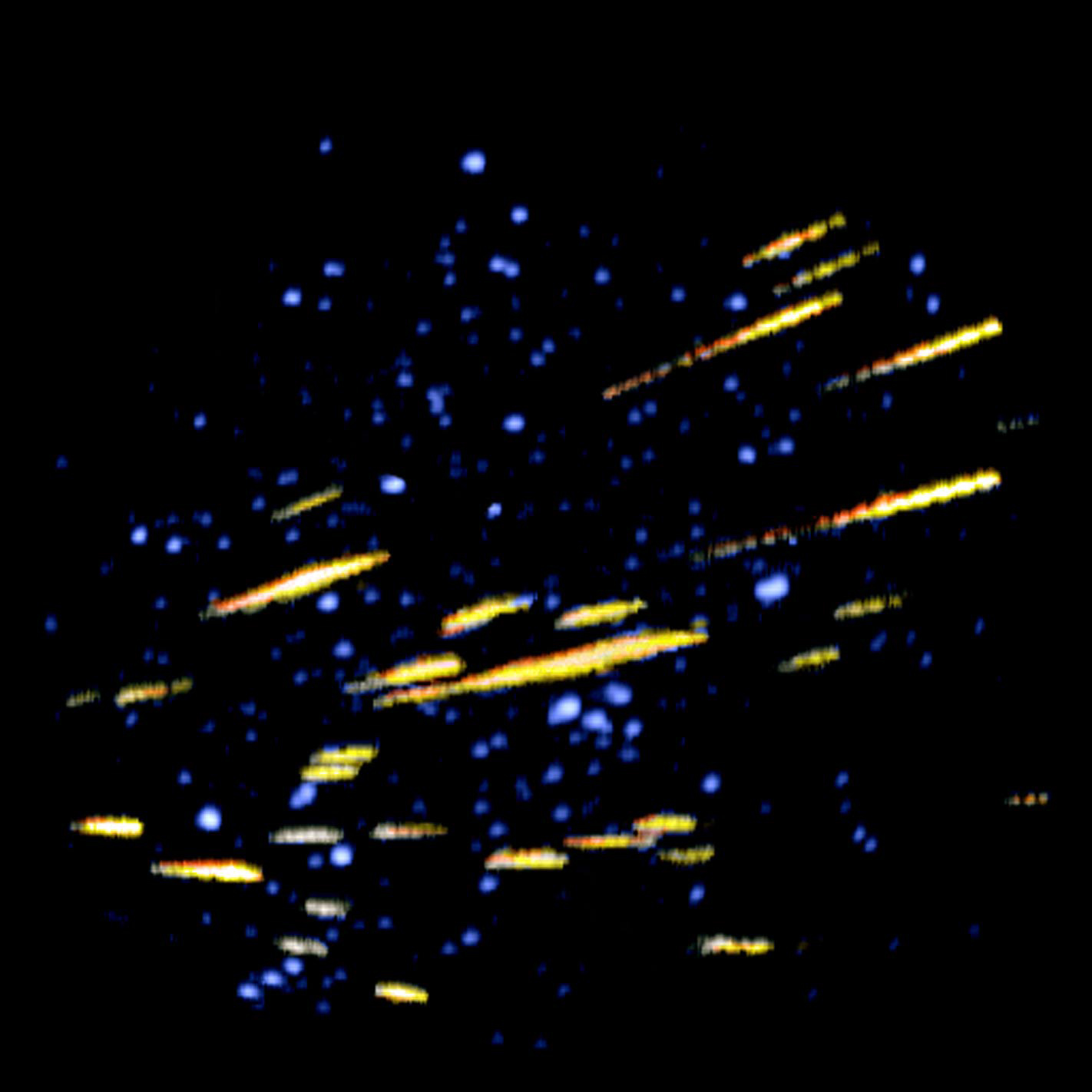
Alpha-Monocerotid meteor outburst in 1995

Meteoritics (Note: Originally rarely called "astrolithology".) is the science that deals with meteors, meteorites, and meteoroids. (Note: A meteorite is a solid rock which has landed on Earth after originating in space. It should not be confused with a meteor (a shooting star, caused by an incoming object burning up in the Earth's atmosphere) or a meteoroid (a small body orbiting within the Solar System). When the Journal of the Meteoritical Society and the Institute of Meteoritics of the University of New Mexico first appeared in 1953, it quoted the then accepted definition of meteoritics as the science of meteorites and meteors, but it went on to explain that meteorites at the time included what are now called meteoroids: Meteoritics may be defined independently of meteorites and meteors, however, as that branch of astronomy that is concerned with the study of the solid matter that comes to the Earth from space; of the solid bodies of subplanetary mass that lie beyond the Earth; and of the phenomena that are associated with such matter or such bodies. The term meteoroid was not defined until 1961 by the International Astronomical Union, and the Minor Planet Center still doesn't use the term.) It is closely connected to cosmochemistry, mineralogy and geochemistry. A specialist who studies meteoritics is known as a meteoriticist.

Scientific research in meteoritics includes the collection, identification, and classification of meteorites and the analysis of samples taken from them in a laboratory. Typical analyses include investigation of the minerals that make up the meteorite, their relative locations, orientations, and chemical compositions; analysis of isotope ratios; and radiometric dating. These techniques are used to determine the age, formation process, and subsequent history of the material forming the meteorite. This provides information on the history of the Solar System, how it formed and evolved, and the process of planet formation.

== History of investigation ==
Before the documentation of L'Aigle it was generally believed that meteorites were a type of superstition and those who claimed to see them fall from space were lying.

The only entry of a large meteoroid into Earth’s atmosphere in modern history with firsthand accounts was the Tunguska event of 1908.

In 1960 John Reynolds discovered that some meteorites have an excess of ^{129}Xe, a result of the presence of ^{129}I in the solar nebula.

== Methods of investigation ==
=== Mineralogy ===
The presence or absence of certain minerals is indicative of physical and chemical processes. Impacts on the parent body are recorded by impact-breccias and high-pressure mineral phases (e.g. coesite, akimotoite, majorite, ringwoodite, stishovite, wadsleyite). Water bearing minerals, and samples of liquid water (e.g., Zag, Monahans) are an indicator for hydrothermal activity on the parent body (e.g. clay minerals).

=== Radiometric dating ===
Radiometric methods can be used to date different stages of the history of a meteorite. Condensation from the solar nebula is recorded by calcium–aluminium-rich inclusions and chondrules. These can be dated by using radionuclides that were present in the solar nebula (e.g. ^{26}Al/^{26}Mg, ^{53}Mn/^{53}Cr, U/Pb, ^{129}I/^{129}Xe). After the condensed material accretes to planetesimals of sufficient size melting and differentiation take place. These processes can be dated with the U/Pb, ^{87}Rb/^{87}Sr, ^{147}Sm/^{143}Nd and ^{176}Lu/^{176}Hf methods. Metallic core formation and cooling can be dated by applying the ^{187}Re/^{187}Os method to iron meteorites. Large scale impact events or even the destruction of the parent body can be dated using the ^{39}Ar/^{40}Ar method and the ^{244}Pu fission track method. After breakup of the parent body meteoroids are exposed to cosmic radiation. The length of this exposure can be dated using the ^{3}H/^{3}He method, ^{22}Na/^{21}Ne, ^{81}Kr/^{83}Kr. After impact on earth (or any other planet with sufficient cosmic ray shielding) cosmogenic radionuclides decay and can be used to date the time since the meteorite fell. Methods to date this terrestrial exposure are ^{36}Cl, ^{14}C, ^{81}Kr.

== See also ==
- Glossary of meteoritics

== Notes and references ==
=== Further reading ===
- G. J. H. McCall, ed. (2006). The history of meteoritics and key meteorite collections : fireballs, falls and finds. London: Geological Society. ISBN 978-1862391949.
