= List of astronomy awards =

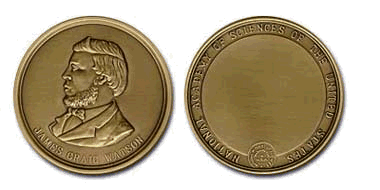
The James Craig Watson Medal.

This list of astronomy awards is an index to articles about notable awards for contributions to astronomy. The list is organized by region and country of the sponsoring organization, but awards are not necessarily limited to people from that country.

== Americas ==
Award	Sponsor	Country	Notes
Annie Jump Cannon Award in Astronomy	American Astronomical Society	United States	Woman resident of North America, within five years of receipt of a Ph.D., for distinguished contributions to astronomy or for similar contributions in related sciences which have immediate application to astronomy
Barringer Medal	Meteoritical Society	United States	Outstanding work in the field of impact cratering and/or work that has led to a better understanding of impact phenomena
Beatrice M. Tinsley Prize	American Astronomical Society	United States	Outstanding research contribution to astronomy or astrophysics of an exceptionally creative or innovative character
Brouwer Award	Division on Dynamical Astronomy, American Astronomical Society	United States	Outstanding lifetime achievement in the field of dynamical astronomy
Bruce Medal	Astronomical Society of the Pacific	United States	Outstanding lifetime contributions to astronomy
Bruno Rossi Prize	High Energy Astrophysics division, American Astronomical Society	United States	Significant contribution to High Energy Astrophysics, with particular emphasis on recent, original work
Carl Sagan Medal	Division for Planetary Sciences, American Astronomical Society	United States	Outstanding communication by an active planetary scientist to the general public
Carl Sagan Memorial Award	American Astronautical Society / The Planetary Society	United States	Leadership in research or policies advancing exploration of the Cosmos
Chambliss Amateur Achievement Award	American Astronomical Society	United States	Achievement in astronomical research made by an amateur astronomer resident in North America
Chambliss Astronomical Writing Award	American Astronomical Society	United States	For astronomy writing for an academic audience
Clifford W. Holmes Award	RTMC Astronomy Expo	United States	Individual for a significant contribution to popularizing astronomy
Dannie Heineman Prize for Astrophysics	American Astronomical Society / American Institute of Physics	United States	Outstanding work in astrophysics
Edgar Wilson Award	Smithsonian Astrophysical Observatory	United States	Amateur comet discoverers
George Ellery Hale Prize	Solar Physics Division, American Astronomical Society	United States	Outstanding contributions over an extended period of time to the field of solar astronomy
George Van Biesbroeck Prize	American Astronomical Society	United States	Long-term extraordinary or unselfish service to astronomy, often beyond the requirements of his or her paid position
Gerard P. Kuiper Prize	Division for Planetary Sciences, American Astronomical Society	United States	Outstanding lifetime achievement in the field of planetary science
Gordon A. McKay Award	Meteoritical Society	United States	Student who gives the best oral presentation at its annual meeting
Gordon Myers Amateur Achievement Award	Astronomical Society of the Pacific	United States	Significant contributions to astronomy or amateur astronomy by those not employed in the field of astronomy in a professional capacity
Gruber Prize in Cosmology	Gruber Foundation / International Astronomical Union	United States	Discoveries leading to fundamental advances in our understanding of the universe
Harold C. Urey Prize	Division for Planetary Sciences, American Astronomical Society	United States	Outstanding achievements in planetary science by a young scientist
Helen B. Warner Prize for Astronomy	American Astronomical Society	United States	Young astronomer (aged less than 36, or within 8 years of the award of their PhD) for a significant contribution to observational or theoretical astronomy
Henry Draper Medal	National Academy of Sciences	United States	For investigations in astronomical physics
Henry Norris Russell Lectureship	American Astronomical Society	United States	Lifetime of excellence in astronomical research
J. Lawrence Smith Medal	National Academy of Sciences	United States	Investigations of meteoric bodies
James Craig Watson Medal	National Academy of Sciences	United States	Contributions to astronomy
Jessberger Award	Meteoritical Society	United States	Outstanding research by a mid-career, female isotope geochemist
Jonathan Eberhart Planetary Sciences Journalism Award	Division for Planetary Sciences	United States	Recognize and stimulate distinguished popular writing on planetary sciences
Joseph Weber Award for Astronomical Instrumentation	American Astronomical Society	United States	Design, invention or significant improvement of instrumentation leading to advances in astronomy
Karen Harvey Prize	American Astronomical Society	United States	Significant contribution to the study of the Sun early in a person's professional career
Klumpke-Roberts Award	Astronomical Society of the Pacific	United States	Outstanding contributions to the public understanding and appreciation of astronomy
LeRoy E. Doggett Prize	American Astronomical Society	United States	Individuals who have significantly influenced the field of the history of astronomy by a career-long effort
Leonard Medal	Meteoritical Society	United States	Outstanding contributions to the science of meteoritics and closely allied fields
Leslie C. Peltier Award	Astronomical League	United States	Amateur astronomer who has contributed observations of lasting significance
Marc Aaronson Memorial Lectureship	University of Arizona	United States	Individual or group who ... has produced a body of work in observational astronomy which has resulted in a significant deepening of our understanding of the universe
Marcel Grossmann Award	International Center for Relativistic Astrophysics	Rome, Italy	Institutions and individuals who have made extraordinary contributions to astrophysics.
Masursky Award	Division for Planetary Sciences, American Astronomical Society	United States	Outstanding service to planetary science and exploration through engineering, managerial, programmatic, or public service activities
Meteoritical Society's Service Award	Meteoritical Society	United States	Promote research and education in meteoritics and planetary science in ways other than by conducting scientific research
National Prize for Exact Sciences	National Prize for Sciences	Chile	e.g., Astronomy, physics, mathematics
Newton Lacy Pierce Prize in Astronomy	American Astronomical Society	United States	Young (less than age 36) astronomer for outstanding achievement in observational astronomical research
Nier Prize	Meteoritical Society	United States	Outstanding research in meteoritics and closely allied fields by young scientists
Nininger Meteorite Award	Center for Meteorite Studies, Arizona State University	United States	Outstanding student achievement in the “Science of Meteoritics” as embodied by an original research paper
Paul Pellas-Graham Ryder Award	Meteoritical Society, Geological Society of America	United States	Best planetary science paper, published in a peer-reviewed scientific journal, and written by an undergraduate or graduate student (as first author)
Petrie Prize Lecture	Canadian Astronomical Society	Canada	Outstanding astrophysicist
Richard H. Emmons Award	Astronomical Society of the Pacific	United States	Outstanding achievement in teaching college-level introductory astronomy classes for non-science majors.
Rittenhouse Medal	Rittenhouse Astronomical Society	United States	Outstanding achievement in the science of Astronomy
Robert J. Trumpler Award	Astronomical Society of the Pacific	United States	Recent recipient of the Ph.D degree whose thesis is judged particularly significant to astronomy
Vera Rubin Early Career Prize	Division on Dynamical Astronomy of the American Astronomical Society	United States	Excellence in dynamical astronomy
Whipple Award	Planetary Sciences Section, American Geophysical Union	United States	Outstanding contribution to the field of planetary science

== Asia ==
Award	Sponsor	Country	Notes
Aryabhata Award	Astronautical Society of India	India	Notable lifetime contributions in the field of astronautics and aerospace technology in India
Kyoto Prize in Basic Sciences	Inamori Foundation	Japan	Earth and planetary sciences, astronomy and astrophysics (one of four prizes)
Shaw Prize	Shaw Prize Foundation	Hong Kong	Outstanding contributions in astronomy, life science and medicine, and mathematical sciences

== Europe ==
Award	Sponsor	Country	Notes
Paolo Farinella Prize	Europlanet Society, European Science Foundation	Europe	Significant contributions in the fields of planetary sciences, space geodesy, fundamental physics, science popularization, security in space, weapons control, and disarmament
Tycho Brahe Prize	European Astronomical Society	Europe	Pioneering development or exploitation of European astronomical instrumentation, or major discoveries based largely on such instruments
Fritz Zwicky Prize for Astrophysics and Cosmology	European Astronomical Society	Europe	Those who have obtained fundamental and outstanding results related to astrophysics and/or cosmology
Janssen Medal	French Academy of Sciences	France	Those who have made advances in astrophysics
Lalande Prize	French Academy of Sciences	France	Scientific advances in astronomy (given from 1802 until 1970)
Prix Guzman	French Academy of Sciences	France	Person who succeeded in communicating with a celestial body, other than Mars, and receiving a response
Prix Jules Janssen	Société astronomique de France	France	French astronomer or astronomer of another nationality in recognition of astronomical work in general, or for services rendered to Astronomy
Valz Prize	French Academy of Sciences	France	Advances in astronomy (given from 1877 until 1970)
Karl Schwarzschild Medal	Astronomische Gesellschaft	Germany	Eminent astronomers and astrophysicists
Ludwig Biermann Award	Astronomische Gesellschaft	Germany	Outstanding young astronomer
Kavli Prize	Norwegian Academy of Science and Letters	Norway	Outstanding contributions in Astrophysics (one of three prizes)
Friedmann Prize	Russian Academy of Sciences	Russia	Outstanding work in cosmology and gravity.
Balzan Prize	International Balzan Prize Foundation	Switzerland	Outstanding achievements in the fields of humanities, natural sciences, culture, as well as for endeavours for peace and the brotherhood of man
Eddington Medal	Royal Astronomical Society	United Kingdom	Investigations of outstanding merit in theoretical astrophysics
George Darwin Lectureship	Royal Astronomical Society	United Kingdom	Distinguished and eloquent speaker on the subject of Astronomy including astrochemistry, astrobiology and astroparticle physics
Gold Medal of the Royal Astronomical Society	Royal Astronomical Society	United Kingdom	Achievement in astronomy or geophysics
Herschel Medal	Royal Astronomical Society	United Kingdom	Investigations of outstanding merit in observational astrophysics
Jackson-Gwilt Medal	Royal Astronomical Society	United Kingdom	Invention, improvement, or development of astronomical instrumentation or techniques; achievement in observational astronomy
Price Medal	Royal Astronomical Society	United Kingdom	Investigations of outstanding merit in solid-earth geophysics, oceanography, or planetary sciences
Tyson Medal	University of Cambridge	United Kingdom	Student award for best proficient in Mathematics and Astronomy

== Oceania ==
Award	Sponsor	Country	Notes
Bok Prize	Astronomical Society of Australia / Australian Academy of Science	Australia	Outstanding research in astronomy by an honours student at an Australian university

== See also ==
- Lists of awards
- Lists of science and technology awards
