= Ryder (crater) =

Crater on the Moon

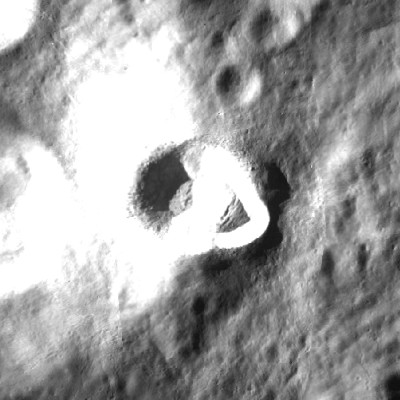
- LRO WAC image
- Coordinates: 44.5°S 143.2°E
- Diameter: 17 km
- Depth: Unknown
- Colongitude: 217° at sunrise
- Formation: Copernican
- Eponym: Graham Ryder

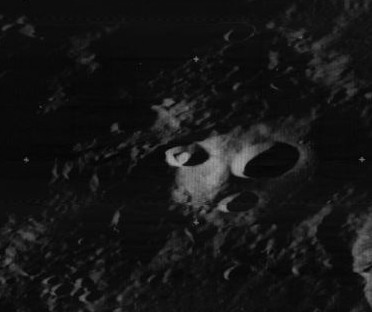
Lunar Orbiter 3 image (Ryder is at center)

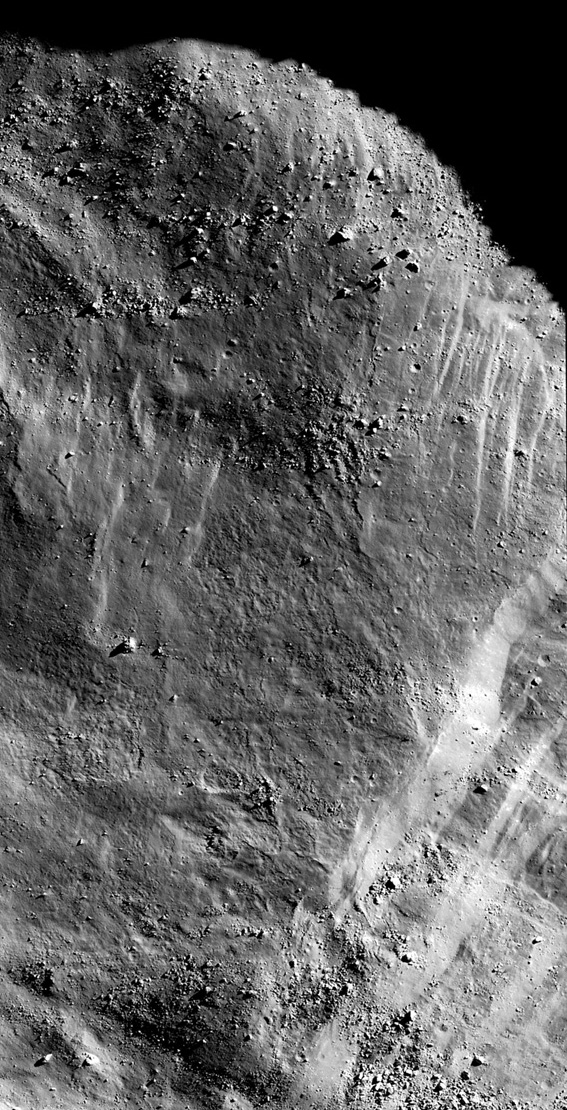
Layered deposits visible in Ryder crater, photographed by LROC

Ryder is a crater on the far side of the Moon. It is located in a patch of higher albedo surface material to the east of the larger Roche–Pauli crater pair. The name for this crater was officially approved at the IAU general assembly in 2006.

This circular-rimmed crater lies along the eastern rim of a larger formation that is most likely the remains of an old, worn impact. Ryder is a fresh crater that is less than 150 million years old, and so dates to the Copernican period of the lunar geologic timescale. The infrared spectrum of pure crystalline plagioclase has been identified on the northwest wall and southeast rim of Ryder. Less than a crater diameter to the west of Ryder is the 24-km-diameter satellite crater Pauli E. Ryder is an oblique impact, and a coherent, layered piece of the lunar crust lies on its side on the eastern side of the crater.
