= Peter H. Schultz =

American astronomer and academic

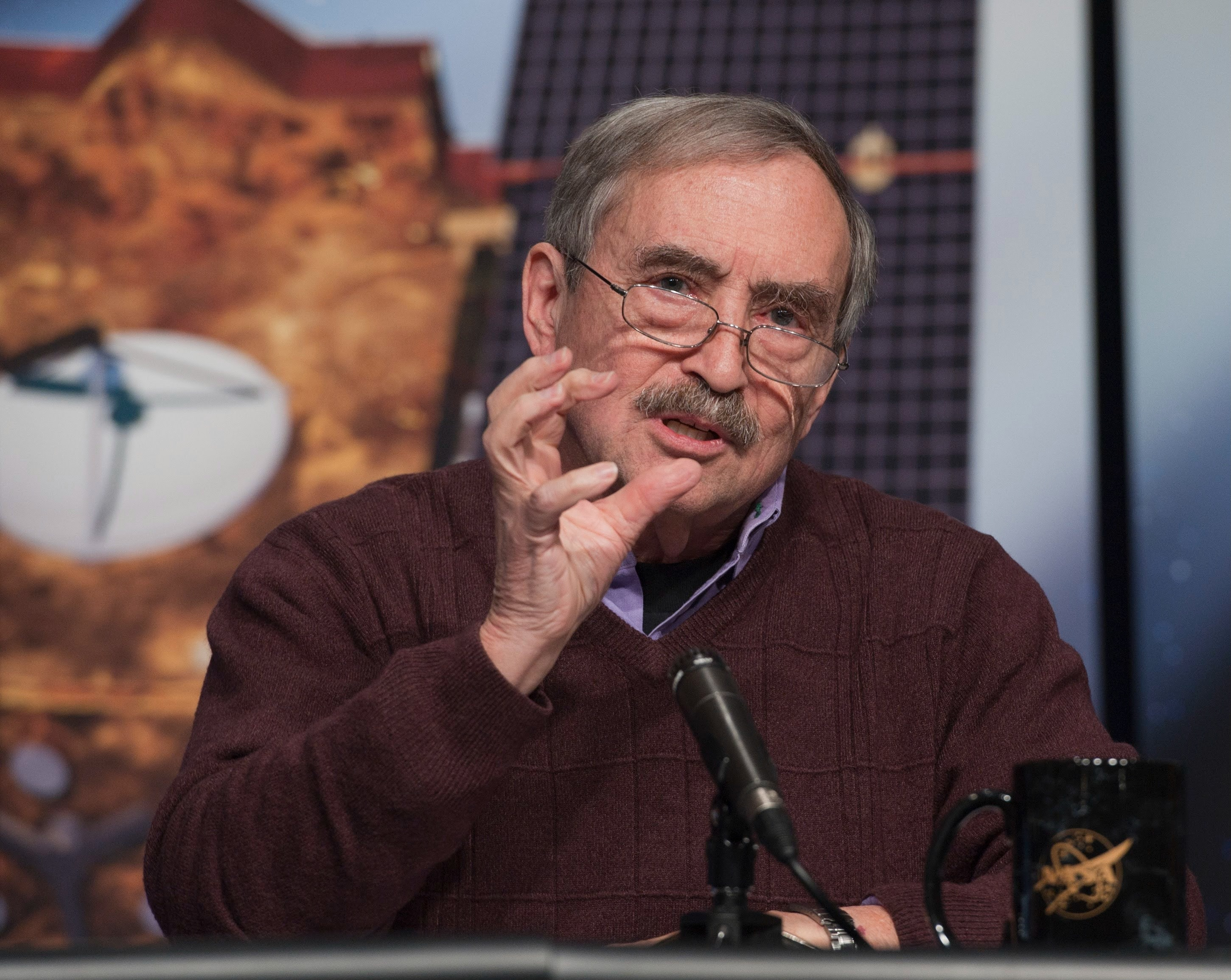
- Born: January 22, 1944 (age 82); New Haven, Connecticut, U.S.
- Education: Carleton College; University of Texas - Austin
- Awards: 16952 PeteSchultz asteroid; 2004 Barringer Medal; NASA Group Achievement Award; Medal of Achievement, National Academy of Sciences of Argentina; G. K. Gilbert Award
- Scientific career
- Fields: Planetary science Astronomy
- Workplaces: NASA Ames Research Center; Lunar and Planetary Institute; Brown University
- Academic advisors: J. Hoover Mackin; William R. Muehlberger

Peter H. Schultz (born January 22, 1944) is Professor of Geological Sciences at Brown University specializing in the study of planetary geology, impact cratering on the Earth and other objects in the Solar System, and volcanic modifications of planetary surfaces. He was co-investigator to the NASA Science Mission Directorate spacecraft Deep Impact and the Lunar Crater Observation and Sensing Satellite (LCROSS). He was awarded the Barringer Medal of the Meteoritical Society in 2004 for his theoretical and experimental studies of impact craters.

== Education ==
Schultz earned a BA degree from Carleton College in Minnesota in 1966. He received a Ph.D. in astronomy from the University of Texas at Austin in 1972.

== Career ==
He was a research associate at the NASA Ames Research Center. In 1976 he joined the Lunar and Planetary Institute (LPI) as a staff scientist and Regional Planetary Image Facility (RPIF) director. In 1984 Schultz was appointed associate professor in the Department of Geological Sciences at Brown University and was named professor in 1994. He serves as the science coordinator for the NASA Ames Vertical Gun Range, chair for NASA Regional Planetary Image Facilities board, director of NASA Rhode Island Space Grant Consortium, and director of the Northeast Planetary Data Center.

Schultz is the author of the 1976 book Moon Morphology: Interpretations Based on Lunar Orbiter Photography. He was co-editor for A Primer in Lunar Geology, Multi-Ring Basins, and Geological Implications of Impacts of Large Asteroids and Comets on the Earth.

== Awards and honors ==
At the Meteoritical Society in 2004, Schultz was awarded the Barringer Medal for his theoretical and experimental studies of impact craters, which have helped to elucidate cratering processes on the Earth, Moon, Mercury, Venus, and Mars.

His contribution to cratering phenomena experimentally and in the field was recognized with the naming of the asteroid 16592 PeteSchultz in his honor. On the BBC Horizon programme on asteroids, "The Good, the Bad, and the Ugly", first broadcast in 2010, Schultz jokes about the possibility that his asteroid might collide with Earth: "It's a bullet with my name on it."

At the 2010 Hypervelocity Impact Symposium in Freiburg, Germany, Schultz received the Distinguished Scientist Award for significant and lasting contributions to the field of hypervelocity science.

In 2012, Schultz was awarded the G. K. Gilbert Award by the Geological Society of America Planetary Division for his outstanding contributions to the solution of a fundamental problem(s) of planetary geology.

== See also ==
- Impact crater
