= Dence =

Dence may refer to:

- 4340 Dence, a main-belt asteroid, named after Michael R. Dence
- Maggie Dence (born 1942), an Australian actress
