= John Guest (geologist) =

British volcanologist

John Edward Guest
- Born: 6 December 1938; London, England
- Died: 19 May 2012 (aged 73); Church Stretton, Shropshire, England
- Education: University College London
- Occupations: Volcanologist, Planetary scientist
- Employer: University College London
- Awards: G. K. Gilbert Award (1991)

John Edward Guest (6 December 1938 – 19 May 2012), was a British volcanologist and planetary scientist.

== Education and family ==
Guest was born in London, England. He studied at University College London (UCL) and he graduated there in 1962. He and Mary Guest, his wife, had two sons, Ben and James

== Career ==
Guest remained as an employee of his alma mater for the remainder of his career. He worked on his PhD under Sydney Ewart Hollingworth on the subject of tertiary ignimbrites in the Chilean Andes, where Hollingworth had been mapping the geology.

Planetary geology and physical volcanology were developed at UCL under his auspices. He did research on a number of volcanoes around the World, but most notably Mount Etna in Sicily. He was the leader of the United Kingdom's efforts in a long-term collaboration with Italy to study the evolution of Mount Etna and, for the first time in over 100 years, make a geological map of it.

In 1984, he was asked by the government of the United Kingdom to assess the volcanic threat to the British military personnel at a NATO base in Sicily. After submitting his report, it found its way - the following day - into the Italian press with the headline, "Bye, bye, Naples!" and Guest used his skills as required to allay the concerns of Italian politicians.

He did postdoctoral study on lunar craters: he worked with Gilbert Fielder, a vocal supporter of the volcanic origin of the craters, at the university observatory. Guest soon rejected Fielder's commonly held belief and instead supported the meteorite-impact mechanism; the new data unequivocally supported his view. He joined NASA's programme for planetary exploration, including the 1973 Mariner 10 mission to Mercury and the 1975 Viking programme to Mars. In 1980, he founded the first NASA Regional Planetary Image Facility outside of the U.S.A. at UCL where he taught many leading international scientists including Rosaly Lopes, Chris Kilburn and Ben Bussey. He was involved with scientists from the Soviet Union on their 1988 Phobos 2 mission to Mars and further with the American 1989 Magellan mission to Venus. He contributed to the first geological map of Mercury and the first detailed map of eastern equatorial Mars, along with Ron Greeley. Guest and Greeley helped to select the Viking 2 landing site. With Philippe Masson, de:Gerhard Neukum, and Marcello Fulchignoni, he founded the European Planetary Geology Consortium in 1976 to foster cooperation in planetary surface studies. In 1999, he moved from the UCL observatory to the Department of Geological Sciences.

As a story-teller, educator and colleague, he was an inspiration to generations of students and considered his role more as a vocation than a job. He was fond of practical jokes; he duped his students into believing in rats occupying lava tubes and that the principal danger to be encountered while working amongst rope-like Hawaiian pahoehoe lavas was a poisonous snake. He had a talent for interpreting geology from morphology, even from photographs. Very inquisitive, he was fascinated by the international cultures and customs he encountered on his travels.

He died at home in Church Stretton, Shropshire.

== Awards ==
- G K Gilbert Award from the Geological Society of America, 1991

== Legacy ==
- Comet 1982 HL was renamed Guest in his honour by the International Astronomical Union in 1991.
- A crater on the Moon was named Guest in his honour by the International Astronomical Union Working Group for Planetary System Nomenclature on 25 July 2017
