= Koblitz =

Koblitz or Köblitz may refer to:

- Weigsdorf-Köblitz, village (Ortsteil) in the municipality of Cunewalde district of Bautzen, Germany
- Wernberg-Köblitz, market town in Bavaria, Germany
- Koblitz (surname)

== See also ==
- Gross–Koblitz formula
