= William B. McKinnon =

American planetary scientists

- Citizenship: United States
- Education: MIT; Caltech
- Awards: G. K. Gilbert Award (2014)
- Scientific career
- Fields: Planetary science
- Workplaces: University of Arizona; Washington University in St. Louis
- Website: eeps.washu.edu

William Beall McKinnon is an American physicist and planetary scientist and Distinguished Professor at the Washington University in St. Louis.

== Early life and education ==
William Beall McKinnon received his B.S. in Earth and Planetary Sciences from MIT in 1976 and his Ph.D in Planetary Science and Geophysics from Caltech in 1981. His thesis Large Impact Craters and Basins: Mechanics of Syngenetic and Postgenetic Modification was supervised by H. Jay Melosh.

== Career ==
McKinnon was a postdoctoral associate at the Lunar and Planetary Laboratory at the University of Arizona and joined the faculty at Washington University in 1982.

=== Research ===
McKinnon investigates the icy satellites of the outer solar system and the physics of impact cratering. His research concentrates on structure, origin, evolution, tectonics, and bombardment history of outer planet satellites and Kuiper belt objects, which are beyond Neptune's orbit.

McKinnon was a Science Team member of the New Horizons mission to Pluto and the Kuiper belt. He was also a Science Team member of the Radar for Icy Moon Exploration (RIME) instrument for ESA’s Jupiter Icy Moons Explorer (JUICE) mission. As of 2017 he was a co-investigator with the REASON radar and MASPEX mass spectrometer instruments for NASA’s Europa Clipper mission.

== Recognition and honors ==
McKinnon received the 2014 G. K. Gilbert Award of the Geological Society of America.

He was elected to the National Academy of Sciences in 2023. He is a Fellow of the American Association for the Advancement of Science.

In September 2025 he was installed as Clark Way Harrison Distinguished Professor and at the Washington University in St. Louis..

The minor planet 9526 Billmckinnon is named after him.
