= Natalia Artemieva =

Russian planetary scientist

Natalia Anatolievna Artemieva
- Born: 1959 (age 66–67); Sverdlovsk, RSFSR, USSR
- Education: Moscow Institute of Physics and Technology
- Scientific career
- Fields: Geophysics, Astrophysics, Astronomy, Planetary science

Natalia Anatolievna (Natasha) Artemieva (Russian: Артемьева Наталия Анатольевна, born 1959) is a Russian planetary scientist whose research involves the computer simulation of meteor impacts and the craters formed by them, especially for planets such as the Earth, Mars, and Jupiter where atmospheric effects play a significant role in the impact behavior. This line of research has also led her to the study of the Cretaceous–Paleogene boundary and the formation of suevite in meteor impacts. She is a senior researcher in the Institute of Geosphere Dynamics in Russia, and a senior researcher at the Planetary Science Institute in Arizona, US.

== Education and career ==
Artemieva was born in Yekaterinburg in 1959. She studied at the Moscow Institute of Physics and Technology, finishing a degree there in 1982, and became a researcher for the Schmidt Institute of Physics of the Earth of the Academy of Sciences of the Soviet Union, from which the Institute of Geosphere Dynamics spun off in the 1990s.

Her interest in meteor impacts was sparked by the 1994 impact with Jupiter of Comet Shoemaker–Levy 9. This led her to develop SOVA, a code for modeling the hypersonic flows arising in meteor impacts. She defended a doctoral dissertation on her work in 1996, jointly supervised by Ivan Nemtchinov and Valery Shuvalov, through the Moscow Institute of Physics and Technology.

She started visiting the University of Arizona and the Planetary Science Institute in 2000, and in 2006 she became a senior researcher at the Planetary Science Institute.

== Recognition ==
Artemieva was the 2012 recipient of the Peregrinus Prize of the Berlin-Brandenburg Academy of Sciences and Humanities, given biennially for outstanding achievements by scholars from eastern and southeastern Europe. She was the 2015 recipient of the Barringer Medal of The Meteoritical Society, given for outstanding research in impact cratering and impact phenomena. Ever since the Barringer Medal Award started in 1984, Artemieva was the first woman to be presented with this honor.

Minor planet 11010 Artemieva, discovered in 1981 by Schelte J. Bus, was named for her.
