= Meteoritical Society's Service Award =

Award for scientific contributions

- Awarded for: advancing the goals of the Society other than by conducting scientific research.
- Presented by: Meteoritical Society
- Reward: Lifetime membership of the Society
- First award: c2006

This award honors members of the Meteoritical Society who have advanced the goals of the Society to promote research and education in meteoritics and planetary science in ways other than by conducting scientific research. Examples of activities that could be honored by the award include, but are not limited to, education and public outreach, service to the Society and the broader scientific community, and acquisition, classification and curation of new samples for research. This award may be given annually, and should be given at least every other year. Winners will be granted lifetime membership in the Meteoritical Society.

== Meteoritical Society's Service Award Winners ==
Year	Name
2006	Jörn Koblitz
2007	John Schutt
2008	Drew Barringer
2009	Derek Sears
2010	Joel Schiff
2011	Richard N. Pugh
2012	Ursula Marvin
2013	Jeffrey Grossman
2014	Roy Clarke Jr.
2015	Ralph Harvey
2016	Gisela Poesges
2017	Cecilia Satterwhite
2018	Linda Martel
2019	Rainer Bartoschewitz
2020	Agnieszka Baier
2021	Christian Koeberl
2022	Randy Korotev
2023	Hasnaa Chennaoui Aoudjehane
2024	Richard Greenwood

== See also ==
- List of astronomy awards
- Glossary of meteoritics
