= Qingde =

Qingde is the Mandarin Pinyin spelling of a Chinese male given name. The same name is also spelled Ching-der in Mandarin Wade-Giles (used in Taiwan) and Ching-te in Cantonese pronunciation.

People with this name include:

- Lai Ching-te (born 1959), Taiwanese politician
- Qingde Wang, professor of astronomy at the University of Massachusetts Amherst

== Other uses ==
- Qingde Township (青德镇), Xiangcheng County, Garzê Tibetan Autonomous Prefecture, Sichuan
