= Besla (disambiguation) =

Besla is a genus of sea snails.

Besla or BESLA may also refer to:

- Gurtina Besla (fl. from 2005), Canadian and American astrophysicist
- Black Entertainment and Sports Lawyers Association (BESLA)
