= Paul Spudis =

American geologist, astronomer (1952–2018)

- Born: Paul Dee Spudis; 1952; Bowling Green, Kentucky, US
- Died: 29 August 2018 (aged 66); Houston, Texas, US.
- Occupation: Geologist

Paul D. Spudis (1952–2018) was an American geologist and lunar scientist. His specialty was the study of volcanism and impact processes on the planets, including Mercury and Mars.

Spudis was well known as a leading advocate of a return to the Moon to use its resources to establish and supply a cislunar space transportation system.

== Early life and education ==
In 1976 he earned a B.S. in geology at the Arizona State University. Following his graduation he spent several months working with Dr. Ronald Greeley at Ames Research Center studying various aspects of Lunar and Martian geology, before transitioning to an internship at the Jet Propulsion Laboratory, during the Mars landing of that year. The following year he went to Brown University to study planetary geology, with a focus on the Moon. A year later he earned his master's degree and moved back to Arizona where he started working for Dr. Greeley who had just joined the faculty at Arizona State University. In 1982 he earned a PhD in geology at the university.

== Early career ==
After graduation, he went to work for the U.S. Geological Survey. In the following years he spent in lunar studies and promoting the idea of lunar exploration. He became a principal investigator at the NASA Office of Space Science, Solar System Exploration Division, planetary geology program. He later joined Lunar and Planetary Institute in Houston as a staff scientist.

== Later career ==
Eventually Spudis joined the Johns Hopkins University Applied Physics Laboratory, and became senior staff scientist. He returned to the Lunar and Planetary Institute in Houston in 2008 and was a senior staff scientist there.

He served as a member of a 1991 White House committee, the Synthesis Group, in Washington D.C. In 1994 he was the deputy leader of the Clementine mission science team. He also served on numerous science advisory committees. At Johns Hopkins' Applied Physics Laboratory he developed an imaging radar system for the Indian mission to the Moon, Chandrayaan-1. He was a member of the 2004 Presidential Commission on the Implementation of United States Space Exploration Policy. He was a team member of the Mini-RF experiment on NASA's Lunar Reconnaissance Orbiter mission.

== Personal life ==
Spudis was born in Kentucky to Mattie Wren.

He was married to Anne M. Seaborne until his death.

Spudis died on 29 August 2018 of complications from lung cancer.

== Honors ==
In 2016 the American Society of Civil Engineers awarded him the Columbia Medal.

The inner main-belt asteroid 7560 Spudis is named in honor of Paul Spudis.

Spudis, a crater on the Moon, was named after him in 2021. This crater is next to the famous Shackleton crater on the south polar region of the Moon, which has been an area of particular interest for future lunar landing missions.

== Bibliography ==
Complete bibliography at "Bibliography". spudislunarresources.com. Spudis' personal website.

Books

- Spudis, Paul D. (1993). The geology of multi-ring impact basins: The Moon and other planets. Cambridge University Press.
- Spudis, Paul D. (1996). The Once and Future Moon. Smithsonian Institution Press. ISBN 1-56098-634-4.
- Bussey, Ben; Spudis, Paul D. (2004). The Clementine Atlas of the Moon. Cambridge University Press. ISBN 0-521-81528-2.
- Spudis, Anne; Spudis, Paul D. (2005). Moonwake: The Lunar Frontier. Xlibris Corporation. ISBN 1-4257-0091-8.
- Spudis, Paul D. (2010). Blogging the Moon: The Once and Future Moon Collection. Apogee Prime Books. ISBN 978-1-926837-17-8.
- Spudis, Paul D. (2016). The Value of the Moon: How to Explore, Live, and Prosper in Space Using the Moon's Resources. Smithsonian Institution. ISBN 978-1588345035..

Papers

- Ryder, Graham; Spudis, Paul D. (1979). Volcanism prior to the termination of the heavy bombardment: Evidence, characteristics, and concepts. Conference on the Lunar Highlands Crust. pp. 132–134.
- Spudis, Paul D.; Ryder, Graham (1980). Apollo 17 impact melts and the geology of the Taurus-Littrow highlands. Conference on Multiring Basins. pp. 86–88.
- Spudis, P. D., 1985. A Mercurian chronostratigraphic classification. In Reports of Planetary Geology and Geophysics Program – 1984. Technical Memorandum 87563. Washington, DC: NASA, pp. 595-597.
- Spudis, P.D.; Asmar, S.W.; Bussey, D.B.J.; Duxbury, N.; Friesen, L.J.; Gillis, J.J.; et al. (2002). Sykes, M. (ed.). The Future of Solar System Exploration, 2003-2013. Lunar Exploration Manned and Unmanned. Astronomical Society of the Pacific Conference Series 272. pp. 77–88.
- Sorensen, T.C.; Spudis P.D. (2005). "The Clementine Mission – A 10 year perspective". Journal of Earth System Science. 114 (6): 645–668. Bibcode:2005JESS..114..645S. doi:10.1007/BF02715950. S2CID 128900357.
- Aldridge, E. "Pete" (Chair); Fiorina, C.S.; Jackson, M.P.; Leshin, L.A.; Lyles, L.L.; Spudis, P.D.; et al. (June 2004). A Journey to Inspire, Innovate, and Discover. President's Commission on Implementation of the United States Space Exploration Policy.
- Spudis, P.D. (2011). "Chapter 12. The Moon: Port of Entry to Cislunar Space". In Lutes, C.D.; Hays, P.L. (eds.). Toward a Theory of Space Power: Selected Essays. Institute for National Strategic Studies. Washington DC: National Defense University.
- Spudis, P.D.; et al. (2010). "Initial results for the north pole of the Moon from Mini-SAR, Chandrayaan-1 mission". Geophysical Research Letters. 37 (6) 2009GL042259: L06204. Bibcode:2010GeoRL..37.6204S. doi:10.1029/2009GL042259.
- Spudis, P.D.; Lavoie A.R. (2011). Using the Resources of the Moon to Create a Permanent Cislunar Space Faring System. Space 2011 Conference and Exposition. Long Beach, CA: American Institute of Aeronautics and Astronautics. p. 24. AIAA 2011-7185.
- Lavoie, Tony; Spudis, Paul D. (9 September 2016). The Purpose of Human Spaceflight and a Lunar Architecture to Explore the Potential of Resource Utilization. AIAA SPACE 2016. SPACE Conferences and Exposition. American Institute of Aeronautics and Astronautics. doi:10.2514/6.2016-5526. AIAA 2016-5526. Archived from the original on 29 August 2019 – via arc.aiaa.org (Atypon).
