= Joanna Morgan =

British geophysicist

Joanna Victoria Morgan is a retired British seismologist and geophysicist known for her analyses of the Chicxulub crater the Cretaceous–Paleogene boundary, and the Cretaceous–Paleogene extinction event in which many dinosaur species became extinct, all believed to have been caused by a large meteor impact. Her research on Chicxulub was highlighted by a 2017 BBC documentary, The Day The Dinosaurs Died. She is an emeritus professor of geophysics in the Department of Earth Science & Engineering of Imperial College London.

== Education and career ==
Morgan read geophysics at the University of Southampton, earning a bachelor's degree there in 1980. After field work as a geophysicist and engineer in Australia and Italy, she returned to England for graduate study in marine geophysics at the University of Cambridge, where she completed her PhD in 1988, with the dissertation Seismic studies over continental margins.

She became a senior lecturer at Imperial College in 2000, a reader in 2004, and a professor in 2011.

== Recognition ==
Morgan was the 2020 recipient of the Barringer Medal, an annual award of the Meteoritical Society given for outstanding research on impact cratering. The award recognized her 2016 work on the Chicxulub crater performed through the European Consortium for Ocean Research Drilling, which was also a runner-up in the 2019 Breakthrough of the Year competition of the American Association for the Advancement of Science. She became the first UK recipient and the second woman recipient of the medal.
