= Blakesley Burkhart =

American astrophysicist

- Education: University of Wisconsin–Madison
- Known for: Magnetohydrodynamics research
- Scientific career
- Fields: Astrophysics
- Thesis: New frontiers for diagnosing the turbulent nature of the multiphase magnetized interstellar medium (2014)
- Doctoral advisor: Alex Lazarian
- Website: www.mhdturbulence.com

Blakesley Burkhart is an American astrophysicist. She is the winner of the 2017 Robert J. Trumpler Award awarded by the Astronomical Society of the Pacific, which recognizes a Ph.D. thesis that is "particularly significant to astronomy." She also is the winner of the 2019 Annie Jump Cannon Award in Astronomy and the 2022 winner of The American Physical Society's Maria Goeppert-Mayer Award. The awards both cited her work on magnetohydrodynamic turbulence, and for developing innovative techniques for comparing observable astronomical phenomena with theoretical models.

== Career ==
Burkhart completed her Ph.D. in astronomy at the University of Wisconsin–Madison in 2014. Her dissertation explores "connections between theoretical, numerical, and observational understanding of [magnetohydrodynamic turbulence] as it applies to the neutral, ionized, and molecular interstellar medium." She was a post-doctoral fellow at the Center for Astrophysics | Harvard & Smithsonian. She has made contributions to many other fields outside of plasma turbulence, including star formation, the intergalactic medium, globular cluster formation, and UV space telescope design. She led the discovery of the Eos cloud, a very large-on-the-sky molecular cloud in our local galactic neighborhood. She worked with Mark R. Krumholz and others to develop a unified model of disc galaxies, working to explain why disc galaxies have a lower rate of star formation than is predicted by other models. In August 2018, she became a research scientist at the Flatiron Institute's Center for Computational Astrophysics. She has been working as an associate professor at Rutgers University in the department of Physics and Astronomy since September 2019.

She was the host of the 5 Minute Astronomy podcast from 89.9FM WORT in Madison.

=== Artistic collaboration ===
Burkhart collaborated with choreographer Marla Phelan to create the multimedia dance project "Birth + Carnage", which premiered in 2025 at La Mama Experimental Theatre Club in New York City. The two creators met in 2022 through the Open Interval residency program sponsored by the Simons Foundation and Gibney Dance; the residency allows for partnerships between choreographers with scientists. The work is inspired by astrophysical concepts such as the formation of stars and n-body simulations.

== Personal life ==
Burkhart has a child born in April 2025.

== Selected publications ==
- Burkhart, Blakesley; Falceta-Gonçalves, D.; Kowal, G.; Lazarian, A. (2009-03-01). "Density Studies of MHD Interstellar Turbulence: Statistical Moments, Correlations and Bispectrum". The Astrophysical Journal. 693 (1): 250–266. arXiv:0811.0822. Bibcode:2009ApJ...693..250B. doi:10.1088/0004-637X/693/1/250. ISSN 0004-637X. S2CID 15997930.
- Gaensler, B. M.; Haverkorn, M.; Burkhart, B.; Newton–McGee, K. J.; Ekers, R. D.; Lazarian, A.; McClure–Griffiths, N. M.; Robishaw, T.; Dickey, J. M. (2011-10-05). "Low-Mach-number turbulence in interstellar gas revealed by radio polarization gradients". Nature. 478 (7368): 214–217. arXiv:1110.2896. Bibcode:2011Natur.478..214G. doi:10.1038/nature10446. hdl:2066/92017. ISSN 0028-0836. PMID 21976022. S2CID 1472898.
- Burkhart, Blakesley; Stanimirović, Snežana; Lazarian, A.; Kowal, Grzegorz (2010-01-10). "Characterizing Magnetohydrodynamic Turbulence in the Small Magellanic Cloud". The Astrophysical Journal. 708 (2): 1204–1220. arXiv:0911.3652. Bibcode:2010ApJ...708.1204B. doi:10.1088/0004-637X/708/2/1204. ISSN 0004-637X.
- Burkhart, Blakesley; Dharmawardena, Thavisha E.; Bialy, Shmuel; Haworth, Thomas J.; Cruz Aguirre, Fernando; Jo, Young-Soo; Andersson, B.-G.; Chung, Haeun; Edelstein, Jerry; Grenier, Isabelle; Hamden, Erika T.; Han, Wonyong; Hoadley, Keri; Lee, Min-Young; Min, Kyoung-Wook (2025-04-28). "A nearby dark molecular cloud in the Local Bubble revealed via H_{2} fluorescence". Nature Astronomy. 9 (7): 1064–1072. doi:10.1038/s41550-025-02541-7. ISSN 2397-3366. PMC 12274131. PMID 40687774.

== Selected lecture videos ==
- "The Photon Underproduction Crisis Solved: The Effect of AGN Feedback on the Low Redshift Lyman-alpha Forest", Institute for Theory and Computation, February 8, 2018
- Dr. Burkhart lecturing on “Galaxies as Star-Forming Engines: Simulating the Turbulent Birth of Stars”, Radcliffe Institute for Advanced Study, Harvard, October 14, 2016

== Awards received ==
- Jansky Award, University of Wisconsin–Madison, Department of Astronomy, 2011
- NASA's Wisconsin Space Grant Fellowship, 2013-14
- Robert J. Trumpler Award, 2017
- Annie Jump Cannon Award in Astronomy, 2019
- Packard Fellowship for Science and Engineering, 2020
- Alfred P. Sloan Fellowship, 2021
- Maria Goeppert-Mayer Award, 2022
