= Christian Koeberl =

Austrian geologist

Christian Köberl (Koeberl)
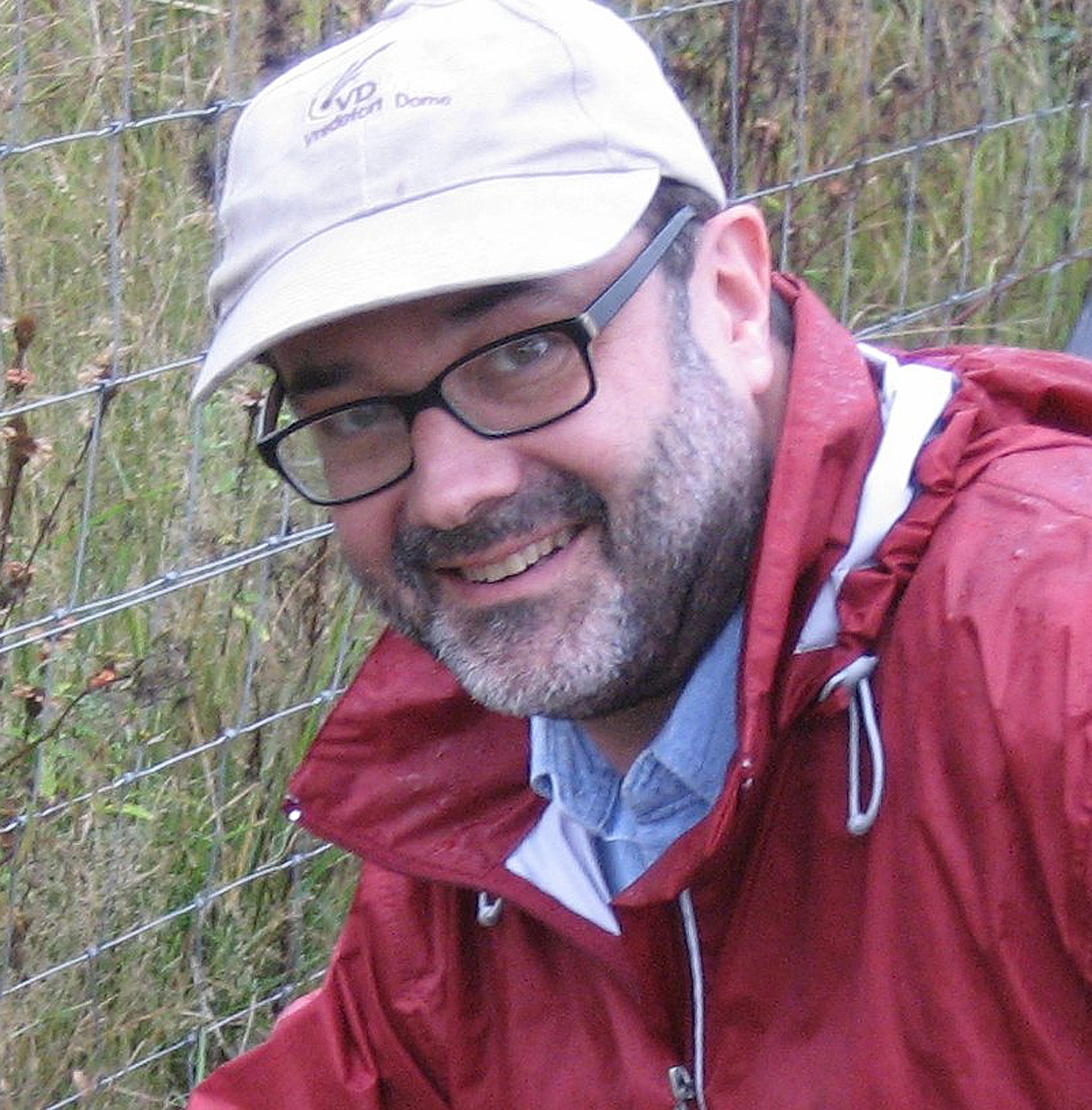
- Born: February 18, 1959 (age 67); Vienna
- Education: University of Graz
- Known for: Impact research
- Awards: Barringer Medal (2007)
- Scientific career
- Workplaces: Naturhistorisches Museum
- Thesis: Neue Untersuchungen zur Genese von Tektiten und Impaktiten (1983)

Christian Köberl (born February 18, 1959, in Vienna) is a professor of impact research and planetary geology at the University of Vienna, Austria. From June 2010 to May 2020 he was director general of the Natural History Museum in Vienna. He is best known for his research on meteorite impact craters.

== Biography and career ==
Born in Vienna, Austria, in 1959, Köberl attended a technical high school specializing in chemistry, and from 1978 studied chemistry and physics at the Technical University of Vienna, as well as astronomy at the University of Vienna. In 1983, he completed his PhD studies at the University of Graz, Austria, with a dissertation in cosmochemistry. In 1985 he joined the faculty of the newly founded Institute of Geochemistry at the University of Vienna, becoming an assistant professor. In 1988, he joined the Lunar and Planetary Institute (Houston, TX, USA) and the NASA Johnson Space Center for half a year as a Fulbright Scholar. This was followed by several more research appointments at these institutions. In 1990, he obtained the "Habilitation" in Geo- and Cosmochemistry at the University of Vienna and was awarded tenure as associate professor.

From 1992 to 1995, Koeberl spent several months of each year at the isotope geochemistry laboratories of the Department of Terrestrial Magnetism at the Carnegie Institution in Washington, DC, USA, to work on osmium isotope geochemistry. In 1993, he was a visiting professor at the University of the Witwatersrand, Johannesburg, South Africa, and in 1994 he was a visiting professor at the Department of Earth Sciences, Dartmouth College, New Hampshire, USA, where he remained an adjunct professor from 1994 to 2000.

In 2004, Koeberl was elected corresponding member, and in 2006 full member of the Austrian Academy of Sciences. In 2006, an asteroid was named after Köberl. In 2007, he received the Barringer Medal of the Meteoritical Society, its highest award for research related to impact cratering studies. From 2007 to 2010, Köberl served as visiting research professor at the Department of Earth Sciences and the Planetary and Space Science Research Institute, Open University, Milton Keynes, United Kingdom. From 2008 until 2010, he was head of the Department of Lithospheric Research, one of the earth science departments at the University of Vienna.

In March 2009, Koeberl was appointed full professor of impact research and planetary geology at the University of Vienna. In December 2009, he was appointed director general of Vienna's Natural History Museum, a post that he took up in June 2010. In addition to remaining on the faculty of the University of Vienna, he is also a member of the board of the Austrian Science Fund and editor of GSA Today, and co-editor of the journals Geochimica et Cosmochimica Acta and Meteoritics & Planetary Science.

== Research ==
Köberl's research activities center around two main themes: the investigation of impact cratering related processes and rocks through detailed and multidisciplinary investigations (mainly using geochemistry, petrography, and mineralogy, but also field geology and geophysics), as well as the development and testing of new methods that can be applied for such studies. He has made contributions to our knowledge of a large number of impact structures, particularly in terms of impact geochemistry, and has in some cases contributed to the discovery of previously unknown impact craters.

His other major research topic involves the determination of extraterrestrial components in impact-related rocks. In addition, Köberl has spent decades in studying tektites, and his work was important in reaching the conclusion that these are a rare form of terrestrial glasses that form in the earliest phases of crater formation. He has been the principal investigator of several International Continental Scientific Drilling Program (ICDP) drilling projects: at the Bosumtwi impact crater in Ghana in 2004, the Chesapeake Bay crater drilling project in the US in 2005/6, the El'gygytgyn crater project in the Russian Arctic in 2009, and the planned Songliao Basin drilling project in China.

Additional research interests include investigations of terrestrial mass extinction horizons (including the late Eocene, K-Pg, Tr-J, and P-Tr strata), of meteorites and lunar rocks, Antarctic meteorite field studies, snowball earth, and several other geochemistry-related issues. He participated in or led numerous field expeditions, including Antarctica in 1986/7 and desert regions in Namibia, South Africa, Egypt, Libya, Mauritania, and Mongolia, and to numerous impact craters around the world. He participated in several documentary movies on impact related topics. From 1998 to 2003 he was chair and coordinator of the European Science Foundation "Impact" program. He is also on the science team of the Midas experiment on board the Rosetta comet probe.

Köberl has written or edited 23 books and is the author of over 550 peer-reviewed research publications. He has organized several international research conferences, including the Annual Meeting of the Meteoritical Society in 1989 in Vienna, Austria; the meeting on Catastrophic Events & Mass Extinctions: Impacts and Beyond, in 2000 in Vienna, Austria; Geological Society of America Field Forum on Bolide Impacts on Wet Targets in Nevada and Utah, USA; and the Geological Society of America Penrose Conference on Hothouse, Icehouse, and Impacts: The Late Eocene Earth at Monte Conero in Italy. In his capacity as director general of the Natural History Museum in Vienna, Köberl is planning to increase the quality and visibility of research at the museum, to provide a larger number and greater variation of special exhibitions covering modern natural sciences, and to renovate and update the permanent exhibitions.

== Honors and awards ==
- 1987 – Antarctica Service Medal of the United States of America
- 1988 – Fulbright Visiting Scholar, USA.
- 1994 – Fellow of the Meteoritical Society
- 1995 – Meritorious Service Award, Geochimica et Cosmochimica Acta
- 1996 – Start-Preis of the Federal Ministry of Science, Austria
- 1997 – Novartis Award for Chemistry
- 2000 – Fellow of the Geological Society of South Africa
- 2004 – elected Corresponding Member of the Austrian Academy of Sciences
- 2006 – elected Full Member of the Austrian Academy of Sciences
- 2006 – Asteroid (15963) named "Koeberl"
- 2007 – Barringer Medal of the Meteoritical Society
- 2019 – Geological Society of America Distinguished Service Award
- 2021 – Meteoritical Society's Service Award
