= Emily Rice =

Astronomy professor

Emily Rice is an astronomy professor at the Macaulay Honors College at the City University of New York. In addition to her scientific contributions to the study of the atmospheric properties of low mass astronomical bodies, she has become well known for her astronomy-related public outreach projects. She is the co-founder of the astro-centric fashion shop STARtorialist, a co-founder for the public outreach series Astronomy on Tap, a parody video creator, and a current research associate for the American Museum of Natural History in New York City. She has appeared as a guest on the popular podcast StarTalk (podcast), and was a host for their spinoff show, StarTalk All-Stars. Rice also served as a public presenter at the Hayden Planetarium in New York.

== Education ==
Rice attended the University of Pittsburgh where she was awarded two B.A. degrees, one in Physics & Astronomy, and the other in German. Following her graduation from the University of Pittsburgh, she then moved to Los Angeles where she completed her M.S. and her Ph.D. at the University of California, Los Angeles. Her master's thesis centered around the characterization of stars within the a young star cluster in the constellation of Aquila. The results of her thesis, which relied upon high-resolution spectra obtained by Lisa Prato, were published in the Astrophysical Journal in 2006 and in the Handbook of Star Forming Regions. For her Ph.D., Rice investigated the physical properties of brown dwarf atmospheres and current model deficiencies via near-infrared spectra. Once her Ph.D. was completed, she served as a postdoctoral fellow for Rebecca Oppenheimer at the American Museum of Natural History in the Exoplanet Group.

== Career ==
Rice is a current faculty member in the Macaulay Honors College. From 2011 to 2019, she was in the Department of Physics & Astronomy at the College of Staten Island, which is also part of the City University of New York. In addition to her role as an associate professor, she is also a founding member, with Kelle Cruz and Jackie Faherty of the Brown Dwarfs in New York City (BDNYC) research group. Her work primarily focuses on near-infrared spectra to characterize the properties of the lowest mass objects in our galaxy, namely: brown dwarfs, very low-mass stars, and giant exoplanets, as well as investigating stellar and planetary system formation mechanisms. Her work has resulted in over 30 co-authored publications. Rice also co-designed and authored a collection of introductory astronomy labs for use in entry-level astronomy courses entitled Astronomy Labs: A Concept Oriented Approach.

She is also well known for her continued involvement with the American Museum of Natural History as a research associate and occasional planetarium presenter at the Hayden Planetarium.

In 2015, she was awarded the Henry Wasser Award for Outstanding Scholarship from CUNY Academy for the Humanities and Sciences.

== Public outreach ==
Though she has made contributions to her field of research, Rice stands out for her successful public outreach activities. She is the co-founder, with Summer Ash of an astronomy-centered fashion blog called the STARtorialist, which boasts the tagline: "Where science meets fashion and scientists get fabulous".

She also dons the moniker DJ Carly Sagan, in honor of the science popularizer Carl Sagan, to organize and host engaging, free-to-the-public science gatherings and presentations at bars in New York City as part of the Astronomy on Tap series.
