= Jackie Faherty =

American astronomer

Dr. Jacqueline K. (Jackie) Faherty is an American astronomer specializing in infrared astronomy and the observation of nearby stars and brown dwarfs, and known for her public outreach in space science.

She works at the American Museum of Natural History as an Associate Curator in the Department of Astrophysics working at the forefront of brown dwarf and exoplanet atmosphere detection and characterization, as an Associate Professor at the Richard Gilder Graduate School, and as a senior education manager in the Department of Education. Together with Drs. Kelle Cruz and Emily Rice, Faherty co-leads the Brown Dwarfs in New York City (BDNYC) research group, which has studied brown dwarfs since 2010.

== Education and career ==
Faherty is a 2001 graduate of the University of Notre Dame. She entered college intending to major in business, but switched to physics after being inspired by the movie Contact and by Jodie Foster's role in it as a space scientist. She went to Stony Brook University for graduate study in physics and astronomy, earning a master's degree there in 2006 and completing her Ph.D. in 2010. Her thesis advisors were Adam Burgasser of the University of California, San Diego, Michael Shara of the American Museum of Natural History, and Frederick M. Walter of Stony Brook.

Before joining the American Museum of Natural History staff, she did postdoctoral research as a National Science Foundation Fellow at the National Astronomical Observatory of Chile from 2011 to 2013, and as a Hubble Fellow in the Department of Terrestrial Magnetism of the Carnegie Institution for Science in Washington, DC from 2013 to 2016.

== Recognition ==
The American Astronomical Society (AAS) gave Faherty their 2020 Vera Rubin Early Career Award, "in recognition of Dr. Faherty’s work on the kinematics of very faint stars in the Milky Way as well as her leadership in developing unique ways to engage the public and professional science teams with ... the precise measurement of celestial objects’ positions and motions on the sky". Faherty was elected to the 2022 class of AAS Fellows, "for outstanding accomplishments in the study of brown dwarfs and directly imaged exoplanets; a dedication to public outreach; and service as an advocate, role model, and mentor to astronomers from underrepresented groups".
