= Nier Prize =

- Awarded for: Outstanding research in meteoritics and closely allied fields by young scientists.
- First award: 1996

The Nier Prize is named after Alfred O. C. Nier. It is awarded annually by the Meteoritical Society and recognizes outstanding research in meteoritics and closely allied fields by young scientists. Recipients must be under 35 years old at the end of the calendar year in which they are selected. The Leonard Medal Committee recommends to the Council candidates for the Nier Prize.

== Nier Prize Winners ==
Year	Name
1996	Laurie Leshin
1997	Timothy McCoy
1998	Gopalan Srinivasan
1999	Byeon-Gak Choi
2000	Meenakshi Wadhwa
2001	Larry Nittler
2002	Dante Lauretta
2003	Steven Desch
2004	Scott Messenger
2005	Nicolas Dauphas
2006	Matthieu Gounelle
2007	Thorsten Kleine
2008	Shogo Tachibana
2009	Gordon Osinski
2010	Daniel Glavin
2011	Fred Ciesla
2012	Fréderic Moynier
2013	Audrey Bouvier
2014	James M. D. Day
2015	Pierre Beck
2016	Greg Brennecka
2017	Francis McCubbin
2018	Lydia Hallis
2019	Aki Takigawa
2020	Thomas Kruijer
2021	Nan Liu
2022	Arya Udry
2023	Jessica Barnes
2024	Elishevah van Kooten
2025	Nicole Nie

== See also ==
- List of astronomy awards
- Glossary of meteoritics
