= Graham Ryder =

English geologist and lunar scientist (1949–2002)

Graham Ryder (28 January 1949 – 5 January 2002) was an English geologist and lunar scientist.

He was educated at the University of Wales, Swansea, receiving his BSc in 1970. He then earned a PhD in geology from Michigan State University in 1974. His post-doctoral work was performed at the Smithsonian Astrophysical Observatory.

Ryder worked at the NASA Johnson Space Center in the Lunar Curatorial Facility for Northrup Services Inc. From 1978 to 1982 he helped in the assembly of catalogues and guides to the Apollo lunar samples. Since 1983 he was a staff scientist at the Lunar and Planetary Institute in Houston, Texas. Much of his work concerned the geology of the lunar surface, including the history of the mare volcanism, Petrology of lunar rocks including highland rocks and breccias, and the chronology of lunar bombardment. He was an advocate of the "3.8 Ga Cataclysmic Bombardment" theory concerning a period of sudden mass impacts of the Moon and inner planets.

His death was caused by complications from cancer of the esophagus.

Ryder was posthumously awarded the Barringer Medal at the 2003 Meteoritical Society meeting for his work in planetary science. The Meteoritical Society's Paul Pellas-Graham Ryder Award is named for him and meteoriticist Paul Pellas. Michigan State University's Graham Ryder Memorial Fund is named in his memory.

The Ryder crater on the Moon has been named in his honour. The crater is located at 44.5°S, 143.2° E , east of the crater Pauli.
