= Brigitte Zanda =

French astronomer (born 1958)

- Born: July 29, 1958 (age 68)
- Education: École normale supérieure de jeunes filles, École nationale supérieure des mines de Paris, Université Paris-Diderot
- Scientific career
- Fields: Meteoriticist, astrophysicist, cosmochemist
- Thesis: Les réactions nucléaires induites par le rayonnement cosmique dans les météorites de fer (1988)
- Doctoral advisor: Jean Audouze

Brigitte Zanda (born July 29, 1958) is a French meteoriticist, astrophysicist, and cosmochemist. She is an associate professor at the National Museum of Natural History (MNHN) in Paris, affiliated with the Institut de minéralogie, de physique des matériaux et de cosmochimie. As a teacher-researcher, she specializes in primitive meteorites: chondrites. In 2019–2020, she served as the vice president of the Meteoritical Society. Additionally, she is the co-director of the FRIPON observation network and the coordinator-manager of the participatory science project Vigie-Ciel.

== Biography ==
Brigitte Zanda was a student at the École normale supérieure de jeunes filles from 1978 to 1982. She continued her education at the École nationale supérieure des mines de Paris where she was a research fellow from 1982 to 1984. From 1984 to 1989, she worked as a research engineer at the Institut d'astrophysique de Paris, affiliated with the CNRS. She defended her doctoral thesis in fundamental geochemistry, entitled Les réactions nucléaires induites par le rayonnement cosmique dans les météorites de fer, at the University of Paris VII in 1988, under the supervision of Jean Audouze. A year later, Brigitte Zanda became an associate professor at the National Museum of Natural History, where she was responsible for the conservation of the national meteorite collection. As part of her professional activities at the Museum, Brigitte Zanda is involved in the dissemination of scientific culture. She also works in the scientific direction of the Astronomy Festival of Fleurance and is responsible for the scientific organization of the AstroNomades festival. She also co-pilots the ANR FRIPON project and directs the IA/ANRU project "Vigie-Ciel".

== Publications ==
- Le fer de Dieu : histoire de la météorite de Chinguetti, with Théodore Monod, Actes Sud, 2008, 152 pages. ISBN 978-2742775521.
- Low temperature magnetic transition of chromite in ordinary chondrites, J. Gattacceca et al., 2011.

== Honors ==
- The asteroid discovered by S.J. Bus on March 2, 1981, initially called "1981 EO42", was named "(5047) Zanda" in her honor.

== See also ==
- (5047) Zanda
