= G. K. Gilbert Award =

Award by American academic society

The G. K. Gilbert Award is presented annually by the Planetary Geology Division of the Geological Society of America for outstanding contributions to the solution of fundamental problems in planetary geology in the broadest sense, which includes geochemistry, mineralogy, petrology, geophysics, geologic mapping, and remote sensing. Such contributions may consist either of a single outstanding publication or a series of publications that have had great influence in the field. The award is named for the pioneering geologist G. K. Gilbert. This award is not to be confused with the G. K. Gilbert Award for Excellence in Geomorphological Research given by the American Association of Geographers, or the G.K. Gilbert Award in Surface Processes given by the Earth and Planetary Surface Processes Section of the American Geophysical Union.

== Award winners ==
Year	Name	Notes
1983	Eugene M. Shoemaker	
1984	George Wetherill	
1985	Walter Alvarez	
1986	Ralph Belknap Baldwin	
1987	Donald Gault	
1988	Don Wilhelms	
1989	Harrison Schmitt	
1990	Harold Masursky	
1991	John Guest	
1992	John A. Wood	
1993	Michael Carr	
1994	Ross Taylor	
1995	Baerbel Lucchitta	
1996	Robert P. Sharp	
1997	Ronald Greeley	
1998	John B. Adams	
1999	Sean Solomon	
2000	Larry Soderblom	
2001	H. Jay Melosh	
2002	James W. Head	
2003	Roger J. Phillips	
2004	William K. Hartmann	
2005	Lionel Wilson	
2006	Michael J. Gaffey	
2007	Maria Zuber	
2008	Philip Christensen	
2009	Robert Strom	
2010	Carle Pieters	Brown University
2011	Steven Squyres	Cornell University
2012	Peter Schultz	Brown University
2013	Alan D. Howard	
2014	William B. McKinnon	Washington University in St. Louis
2015	Matthew Golombeck	
2016	M. Darby Dyar	
2017	John Grant	
2018	Jeffrey Moore	
2019	Alfred McEwen	
2020	James Zimbelman	
2021	Janice Bishop	
2022	Allan Treiman	
2023	Candice Joy Hansen-Koharcheck	
2024	Charles "Chip" Shearer	

== See also ==
- List of geology awards
- Prizes named after people
