= Robert J. Trumpler Award =

The Robert J. Trumpler Award of the Astronomical Society of the Pacific is given annually to a recent recipient of the Ph.D degree whose thesis is judged particularly significant to astronomy. The award is named after Robert Julius Trumpler, a notable Swiss-American astronomer (1886–1956).

== Previous award winners ==
Source: ASP

- 1974 David Schramm, University of Texas at Austin
- 1975 J. Richard Gott, Princeton University
- 1976 Robert Hanson, University of California, Santa Cruz
- 1977 John Black, Harvard University
- 1978 Typhoon Lee, University of Texas at Austin
- 1979 Gary Schmidt, University of Arizona
- 1980 Luis Rodriguez, Harvard University, and James Liebert, University of California, Berkeley
- 1981 Richard Kron, University of California, Berkeley
- 1982 Bruce Twarog, Yale University
- 1983 Donald Winget, University of Rochester, and Nicholas B. Suntzeff, University of California, Santa Cruz
- 1984 Deidre Hunter, University of Illinois at Urbana–Champaign
- 1985 Paul L. Hertz, Harvard University
- 1986 John Hill, University of Arizona
- 1987 Stephen Schneider, University of Massachusetts Amherst
- 1988 Jill Bechtold, University of Arizona
- 1989 Donald Terndrup, University of California, Santa Cruz
- 1990 Charles Bailyn, Harvard University
- 1991 Fred Adams, University of California, Berkeley
- 1992 Qingde Wang, Columbia University
- 1993 Megan Donahue, University of Colorado Boulder
- 1994 Joe Shields, University of California, Berkeley
- 1995 Julie Thorburn, University of Chicago
- 1996 Wayne Hu, University of California, Berkeley
- 1997 John Hibbard, Columbia University
- 1998 Luis Ho, University of California, Berkeley
- 1999 Adam Riess, Harvard University
- 2000 Scott Burles, University of California, San Diego
- 2001 Michael A. Pahre, California Institute of Technology
- 2002 Volker Bromm, Yale University
- 2003 Daniel E. Reichart, University of Chicago
- 2004 David Charbonneau, Harvard University
- 2005 Jennifer Scott and Siming Liu, University of Arizona
- 2006 Steven Furlanetto, Harvard University
- 2007 Edo Berger, California Institute of Technology
- 2008 Anjum Mukadam, University of Washington
- 2009 Kevin Bundy, California Institute of Technology
- 2010 Robert Quimby, University of Texas
- 2011 Philip Hopkins, Harvard University
- 2012 Charles Conroy, Princeton University and Emily Levesque, University of Hawaiʻi
- 2013 Gurtina Besla, Harvard University
- 2014 Brendan Bowler, University of Hawaiʻi
- 2015 H. Jabran Zahid, University of Hawaiʻi
- 2016 Rachael L. Beaton, University of Virginia
- 2017 Blakesley Burkhart, University of Wisconsin Madison
- 2018 Benjamin J. ("BJ") Fulton, University of Hawaiʻi
- 2019 Katheryn Decker French, University of Arizona
- 2020 Gudmundur Kari Stefansson, The Pennsylvania State University
- 2021 Jane Huang, Harvard University
- 2022 Ariadna Murguia-Berthier, University of California, Santa Cruz
- 2023 Deborah Lokhorst, University of Toronto
- 2024 Maggie Thompson, University of California, Santa Cruz
- 2025 Justin Myles, Stanford University

== See also ==
- List of astronomy awards
- Prizes named after people
