= Hasnaa Chennaoui Aoudjehane =

Moroccan geologist

Hasnaa Chennaoui Aoudjehane Moroccan Arabic: حسناء الشناوي
- In southern Morocco
- Born: 1964 (age 61–62); Morocco
- Education: Hassan II University of Casablanca
- Occupations: Geologist, researcher
- Employer: Professor of Geology

Hasnaa Chennaoui Aoudjehane (Moroccan Arabic: حسناء الشناوي, born 1964) is a Moroccan geologist and an expert on the geochemistry of meteorites. She is a professor of geology at Hassan II University of Casablanca. Beyond the scientific study of meteorites, her efforts led to a 2021 legal decree regulating the sale and export of meteorites from Morocco.

Chennaoui was born in Casablanca, where her father was a merchant. Her mother, a school principal, was one of the first women to attend school in Morocco. She has a doctorate in the geochemistry of noble gases from Pierre and Marie Curie University in Paris, France, in 1992, and a doctorat d'état in meteoritics from Hassan II University, in 2007. She is the first woman in Morocco with a degree in meteoritics.

Chennaoui was a 2009 recipient of the Prix Paul Doistau–Émile Blutet. The Moroccan National Company of Radio and Television (SNRT) gave her an award as a distinguished woman of Morocco in 2012. She was the 2023 recipient of the Meteoritical Society's Service Award. Minor planet 299020 Chennaoui is named for her.
