= Vera Rubin Early Career Prize =

Astronomy award

- Awarded for: Excellence in Dynamical Astronomy
- Website: Official website

The Vera Rubin Early Career Prize is named after the American astronomer Vera Rubin and is awarded by the Division on Dynamical Astronomy of the American Astronomical Society. The prize recognizes excellence in dynamical astronomy. Recipients must have received their doctorate no more than ten years prior.

== Winners ==
Year	Name
2017	Daniel Fabrycky
2018	Gurtina Besla
2019	Jo Bovy
2020	Jacqueline Faherty
2021	Ann-Marie Madigan
2022	Kathryn Volk
2023	Carl Rodriguez
2024	Sarah Millholland
2025	Samuel Hadden
2026	Juliette Becker

== See also ==
- List of astronomy awards
