= Paul Pellas-Graham Ryder Award =

Award for planetary science students

- Awarded for: Best planetary science paper of previous year by an undergraduate or graduate student.
- Sponsored by: Meteoritical Society and Planetary Geology Division of the Geological Society of America
- First award: 2002

The Paul Pellas-Graham Ryder Award is jointly sponsored by the Meteoritical Society and the Planetary Geology Division of the Geological Society of America. It recognizes the best planetary science paper, published during the previous year in a peer-reviewed scientific journal, and written by an undergraduate or graduate student (as first author). The topics covered by the award are listed on the cover of Meteoritics and Planetary Science. It has been given since 2002, and honors the memories of the incomparable meteoriticist Paul Pellas and lunar scientist Graham Ryder.

There have been 21 recipients of the award since its inception in 2002. The recipient's journal articles awarded have collectively been cited more than 2100 times as of December 31, 2019.

== Paul Pellas-Graham Ryder Award Winners ==
Sources: Meteoritical Society, GSA Planetary Geology Division

Paul Pellas-Graham Ryder Award Winners
Paper published	Year awarded	Name	Institution	General Topic
2000	2002	Natasha Johnson	Washington University	Venus
2001	2003	Björn Davidsson	Uppsala University	Comets
2002	2004	Nicolas Dauphas	University of Lorraine	Solar Nebula (Isotopes)
2003	2005	Soichi Itoh	Tokyo Institute of Technology	Chondrules
2004	2006	Danielle Wyrick	University of Texas, San Antonio	Mars
2005 & 2006	2007*	James E. Richardson Jr. and Alice Toppani	University of Arizona and University of Lorraine	Asteroids and Solar Nebula
2007	2008	Mathieu Touboul	ETH Zurich	Moon
2008	2009	Bethany L. Ehlmann	Brown University	Mars
2009	2010	Vishnu Reddy	University of North Dakota	K-T Impact
2010	2011	Andrew W. Beck	University of Tennessee	Breccias
2011	2012	D. Alex Patthoff	University of Idaho	Enceladus
2012	2013	Christoph Burkhardt	ETH Zurich	Solar Nebula (Isotopes)
2013	2014	Eike Beitz	Braunschweig University of Technology	Chondrules
2014	2015	Steven M. Battaglia	University of Illinois at Urbana-Champaign	Io (moon)
2015	2016**	Romy D. Hanna and Tanya Harrison	University of Texas, Austin and University of Western Ontario	Murchison meteorite and Mars
2016	2017**	Gerrit Budde and James T. Keane	University of Münster and University of Arizona	Chondrules and Pluto
2017	2018	Emily Worsham	University of Maryland	iron meteorites
2018	2019	Simon Lock	Harvard University	Moon
2019	2020	Sabina Raducan	Imperial College London	Asteroids
2020	2021	Jan Hellmann	University of Münster	carbonaceous chondrites

*Timing of award adjusted by presenting two in the same year.

**Jointly awarded to two recipients in the same year.

== See also ==
- List of astronomy awards
- Glossary of meteoritics
- Venus
- Comet
- Solar nebula
- Chondrule
- Mars
- Asteroid
- Moon
- Cretaceous-Paleogene boundary
- Breccia
- Enceladus
- Isotope
- Io (moon)
- Murchison meteorite
- Pluto
- Tungsten
