= H. Jay Melosh =

American geophysicist (1947–2020)

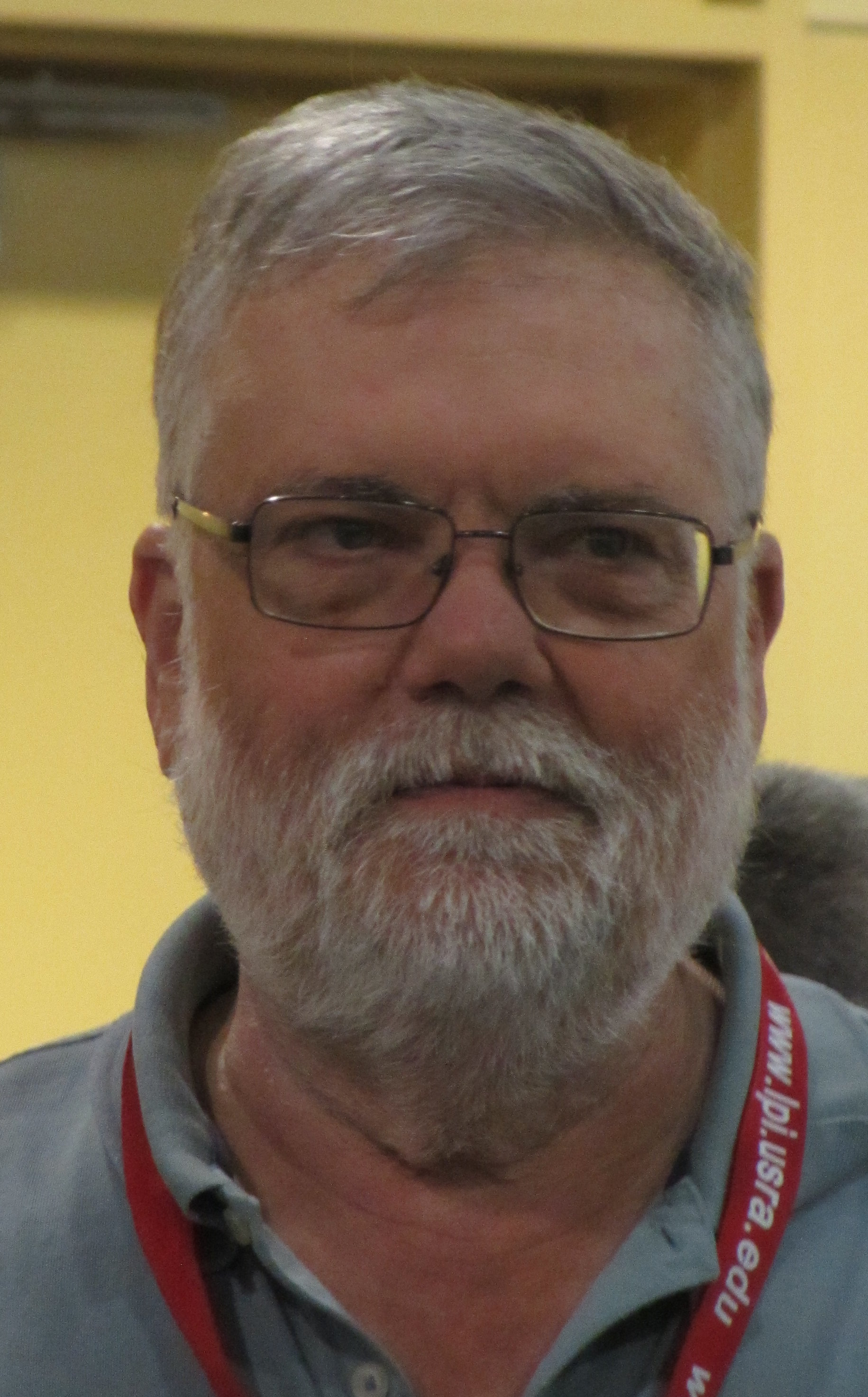
- Born: June 23, 1947; Paterson, New Jersey
- Died: September 11, 2020 (aged 73)
- Citizenship: United States
- Education: Princeton; Caltech
- Known for: Impact Cratering Studies
- Awards: Barringer Medal (1999); G K Gilbert Award
- Scientific career
- Fields: Geophysics
- Workplaces: Purdue University
- Website: eaps.purdue.edu/people/faculty-pages

H. Jay Melosh (June 23, 1947 – September 11, 2020) was an American geophysicist specialising in impact cratering. He earned a degree in physics from Princeton University and a doctoral degree in physics and geology from Caltech in 1972. His PhD thesis concerned quarks. Melosh's research interests include impact craters, planetary tectonics, and the physics of earthquakes and landslides. His recent research includes studies of the giant impact origin of the Moon, the Chicxulub impact that is thought to have extinguished most dinosaurs, and studies of ejection of rocks from their parent bodies. He was active in astrobiological studies that relate chiefly to the exchange of microorganisms between the terrestrial planets (a process known as panspermia or transpermia).

Melosh was a member of the American Geophysical Union, Geological Society of America, Meteoritical Society, American Astronomical Society (Division of Planetary Sciences,) and the American Association for the Advancement of Science. He was the recipient of the Barringer Medal of the Meteoritical Society for his work on the physics of impact, and of the G. K. Gilbert Award from the Geological Society of America. He was elected to the National Academy of Sciences in 2003.

== Career ==
Melosh took his first faculty role at Caltech between 1976 and 1979, where he researched the Moon's orientation in relation to mass concentrations (mascons) and large impacts, and was also a member of the GRAIL science team. He then went on to take a position with SUNY Stonybrook as an associate professor of geophysics until 1982 when he left to join the University of Arizona as a faculty member in the planetary sciences, where he continued work on impact cratering until 2009. In 2009, Dr. Melosh moved to the Purdue University Department of Earth, Atmospheric, and Planetary Sciences to study impact cratering, planetary science, and geophysics until his retirement.

== Awards and honors ==
- Asteroid 8216 Melosh is named in his honor.
- The American Geophysical Union 2008 Harry H. Hess Medal - for “outstanding achievements in research in the constitution and evolution of Earth and sister planets.”
- In 2024 Melosh Crater was named after him in his honor. The crater is located near the Aram Chaos terrain in the equatorial region of Mars. The crater is almost 100 km in diameter and has a history of lava infilling and water flooding.

== Publications ==
- H. J. Melosh (1989). Impact cratering: A geologic process. Oxford University Press. Bibcode:1989icgp.book.....M. ISBN 0-19-510463-3. LCCN 88005353. OCLC 17649090. OL 7387860M. Wikidata Q105670571.
- Planetary Surface Processes, Cambridge University Press, 2011, (ISBN 0-52-151418-5)
