= Barringer Medal =

- Awarded for: Outstanding work in the field of impact cratering
- Sponsored by: Barringer Crater Company
- Presented by: Meteoritical Society
- Reward: Medal
- First award: 1984
- Website: www.meteoriticalsociety.org

The Barringer Medal recognizes outstanding work in the field of impact cratering and/or work that has led to a better understanding of impact phenomena. The Barringer Medal and Award were established to honor the memory of D. Moreau Barringer Sr. and his son D. Moreau Barringer Jr. and are sponsored by the Barringer Crater Company. The medal is awarded by the Meteoritical Society. The senior Barringer was the first to seriously propose an impact origin for the crater that now bears his name.

== Award winners ==
The first recipient, Eugene Shoemaker, co-discovered Comet Shoemaker–Levy 9 and was the first to offer accepted proof of Barringer Crater’s meteoritic origin.

Year	Name
1984	Eugene M. Shoemaker
1985	Robert S. Dietz
1986	Donald E. Gault
1987	Wolf J. von Engelhardt
1988	Michael R. Dence
1989	Virgil E. Barnes
1990	Richard A. F. Grieve
1991	Victor L. Masaitis
1992	Edward C. T. Chao
1993	Dieter Stöffler
1994	D. W. Roddy
1995	William A. Cassidy
1996	F. Hörz
1997	T. Ahrens
1998	B. A. Ivanov
1999	H. Jay Melosh
2000	Ralph Belknap Baldwin
2001	Alexander T. Basilevsky
2002	Bevan M. French
2003	Graham Ryder
2004	Peter H. Schultz
2005	Billy P. Glass
2006	Robert M. Schmidt
2007	Christian Koeberl
2008	Frank T. Kyte
2009	Wolf Uwe Reimold
2010	William K. Hartmann
2011	Bruce F. Bohor
2012	Jan Smit
2013	Walter Alvarez
2014	Alex Deutsch
2015	Natalia Artemieva
2016	Keith Holsapple
2017	Akira Fujiwara
2018	Thomas Kenkmann
2019	Mark Cintala
2020	Joanna Morgan
2021	Gordon Osinski
2022	Gareth Collins and Kai Wünnemann
2023	Birger Schmitz
2024	John Spray
2025	Sarah T. Stewart-Mukhopadhyay
2026	Philippe Claeys

== See also ==
- List of astronomy awards
- Glossary of meteoritics
