= Jörn Koblitz =

German curator and publisher (born 1961)

Jörn Koblitz (born 1961) is a German curator and publisher. He is the publisher of MetBase, the Meteorite Information Database and Bibliography of Meteoritics and Planetary Sciences, and curator of the MetBase Library of Meteoritics and Planetary Sciences, located in Bremen, Germany.

He is also a co-founder and managing director of microFAB Bremen GmbH, a silicon wafer foundry active in the field of MEMS.

A member of The Meteoritical Society since 1983, he served on the Society's Nomenclature Committee from 1997 to 2003. He received the first Meteoritical Society's Service Award in 2006.
