= Gordon A. McKay Award =

Annual prize given by the Meteorological Society

- Awarded for: best oral student presentation at society's annual meeting
- Presented by: Meteoritical Society
- Rewards: $1,000 and certificate
- First award: 2009

The Gordon A. McKay Award is an annual prize given by the Meteoritical Society to the student who gives the best oral presentation at its annual meeting. This award honors the memory of Gordon A. McKay (1945–2008), a NASA planetary scientist specializing in lunar and Martian geochemistry. It was established in 2008 and comes with a prize of $1,000 and a certificate.

== Gordon A. McKay Award Winners ==
Source: Previous Winners, Meteoritical Society Accessed 4/20/2025

Gordon A. McKay Award Winners
Year	Name
2009	Julia Ann Cartwright
2010	Rachel Smith
2011	Dennis Harries
2012	Maartje Hamers
2013	Nicole Lunning
2014	Romy Hanna
2015	Carolyn A. Crow
2016	Danielle N. Simkus
2017	Jennika Greer
2018	Timothy Gregory
2019	Dara Laczniak

== See also ==
- Glossary of meteoritics
- List of astronomy awards
- List of prizes named after people
