= Eos cloud =

Molecular cloud near the edge of the Local bubble

Nebula
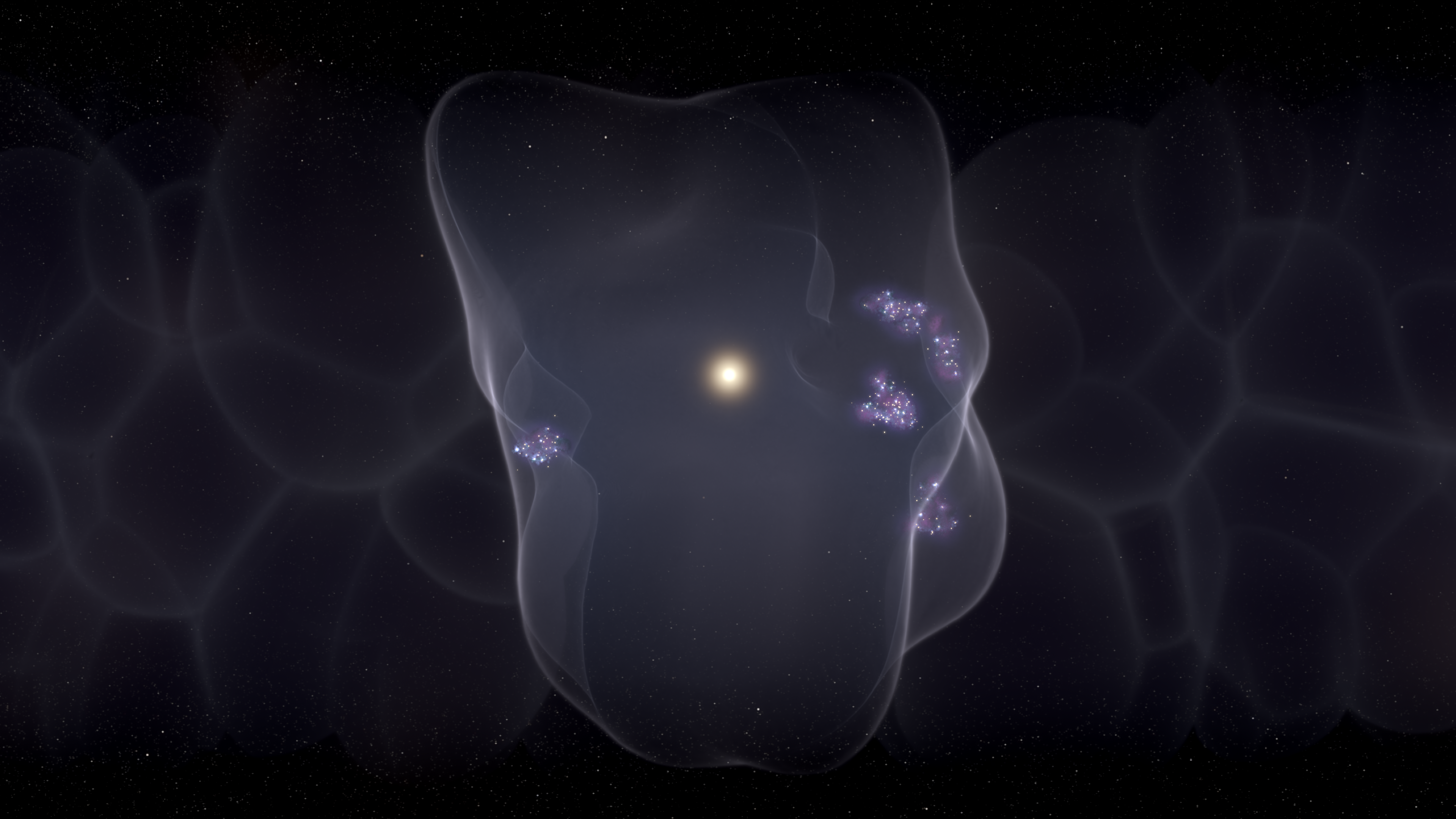
- Artist's illustration of the Local Bubble where the Eos cloud is located. The Sun is in the center.

Observation data
- Distance: 94 pc
- Notable features: Located near the edge of the Local Bubble

The Eos Cloud is a dark molecular cloud of Hydrogen gas located just 94 parsecs from the Sun near the edge of the Local Bubble. The cloud has a small amount of carbon monoxide contained within it. It is predicted that in 5.7 million years, the Eos cloud will photoevaporate.

The cloud was discovered by Blakesley Burkhart and collaborators using H_{2} far ultraviolet fluorescent line emission. Its close proximity (one of the closest clouds to Earth) to Earth allows for easier observation of how these molecular clouds form and dissipate. Their findings were published in 2025; Burkhart initially found indications of the hydrogen cloud in data released from the Far-Ultraviolet Imaging Spectrograph (FIMS) instrument.

The cloud is named after Eos, the Greek goddess of the dawn.
