= Ralph Belknap Baldwin =

American planetary scientist

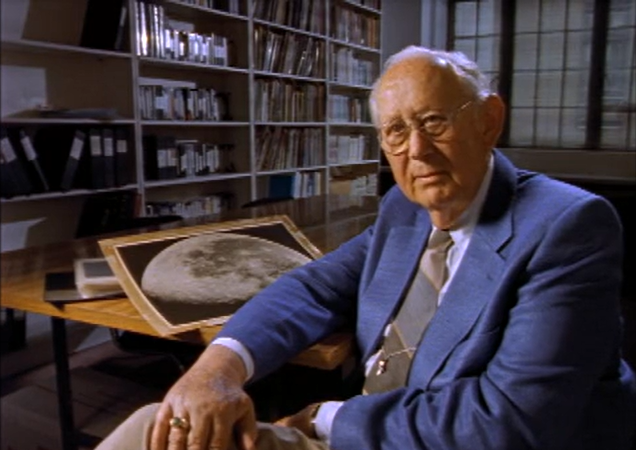
- Baldwin being interviewed in 1998
- Born: June 6, 1912; Grand Rapids, Michigan, United States
- Died: October 23, 2010 (aged 98); Grand Rapids, Michigan, United States
- Education: University of Michigan
- Known for: Showed that lunar craters were the result of impacts, not volcanic in origin. Two of his books were highly influential and helped establish lunar timescales.
- Awards: Army Chief of Ordnance Award (1945); G.K. Gilbert Award (1986); J. Lawrence Smith Medal (1979); Leonard Medal (1986); Barringer Medal (2000)
- Scientific career
- Fields: Lunar science Manufacturing
- Workplaces: Johns Hopkins University; Oliver Machinery Company

Ralph Belknap Baldwin (June 6, 1912 – October 23, 2010) was an American planetary scientist known for his work on lunar craters, beginning in the late 1940s. His book, The Face of the Moon made the case for the impact nature of lunar craters. He published The Measure of the Moon in 1963.

Prior to his lunar work he was Senior Physicist at Johns Hopkins University's Applied Physics Laboratory during World War II working on the proximity fuze. In 1947 he began working for Oliver Machinery Company. In 1970 he became president of the company and chairman of the board in 1982. He retired in 1984. He died on October 23, 2010.

== Early life ==
Baldwin was born in Grand Rapids, Michigan. He attended the University of Michigan, receiving his B.S. in 1934, M.S. in 1935, and Ph.D. in 1937, on the "spectroscopic study of novae". After graduation, he taught astronomy at the University of Michigan, University of Pennsylvania, and Northwestern University from 1935 through 1942. The photographs at the Adler Planetarium, where he lectured to earn extra money, sparked his interest in lunar craters. This led to an article in Popular Astronomy in 1942 and later his book The Face of the Moon, in 1949. During World War II Baldwin helped to develop the radar proximity fuze. He published a history of proximity fuze development in 1980 entitled The Deadly Fuze.

== Awards and honors ==
Baldwin has been honored for each of his three careers. During his work on the radio proximity fuze he was awarded the Army Chief of Ordnance Award and the U.S. Naval Bureau Ordnance Award (1945). In 1947 he was a recipient of the Presidential Certificate of Merit. He was elected a Fellow of the American Academy of Arts and Sciences in 1980.

In planetary science he has been awarded the Barringer Medal (2000), Leonard Medal (1986), G.K. Gilbert Award (1986) and the J. Lawrence Smith Medal (1979).

The Ralph B. Baldwin Award by the Wood Machinery Manufacturers of America was established in his honor.
