= Michael R. Dence =

Canadian academic and physicist

Michael Robert Dence, FRSC OC is a Canadian academic and physicist specializing in impact structures.

Dence was a geologist at the Dominion Observatory and a pioneer in the research of impact craters on the Canadian Shield. Known for making the first good estimates of the cratering rate on the earth in Phanerozoic time from studies of impact structures in Canada and Europe.

Dence received the Barringer Medal in 1988. Dence also served as the executive director of the Royal Society of Canada, beginning in 1986.

Dence was born in Australia.

Minor planet 4340 Dence is named in his honour.
