= Prix Guzman =

Prizes for communication with extraterrestrials, and heart medicine

The Prix Pierre Guzman (Pierre Guzman Prize) was the name given to two prizes, one astronomical and one medical. Both were established by the will of Anne Emilie Clara Goguet (died June 30, 1891), wife of Marc Guzman, and named after her son Pierre Guzman.

== Astronomical ==
This prize was a sum of 100,000 francs, to be given to a person who succeeded in communicating with a celestial body, other than Mars, and receiving a response. Until this occurred, the will also allowed for the accumulated interest on the 100,000 francs to be given, every five years, to a person who had made significant progress in astronomy. The prize was to be awarded by the French Académie des sciences. Pierre Guzman had been interested in the work of Camille Flammarion, the author of La planète Mars et ses conditions d'habitabilité (The Planet Mars and Its Conditions of Habitability, 1892). Communication with Mars was specifically exempted as many people believed that Mars was inhabited at the time and communication with that planet would not be a difficult enough challenge. The prize was later announced in 1900 by the French Académie des sciences.

The five-yearly prize of interest was awarded, starting in 1905, as follows:

- In Dec. 1905, to Henri Joseph Anastase Perrotin. A portion of the prize was also given to Louis Fabry.
- In Dec. 1910, to Maurice Loewy.

The prize was awarded to the crew of Apollo 11 in 1969.

== Medical ==
This prize was a sum of 50,000 francs, to be awarded by the French Académie de médecine, to be given to a person who succeeded in developing an effective treatment for the most common forms of heart disease. Until this occurred, the will also allowed for the accumulated interest to be given yearly to someone who had made progress in heart disease.

The yearly prize of interest was awarded as follows:

- In 1903, to Paul Bergougnan.
- In 1905, to Gillet, with an honorable mention to Braillon.

== See also ==
- List of astronomy awards
- List of medicine awards
