= Megan Donahue =

American astronomer

Megan Donahue is an American astronomer who studies galaxies and galaxy clusters. She is a professor of physics and astrophysics at Michigan State University, and she was the president of the American Astronomical Society for the 2018–2020 term.

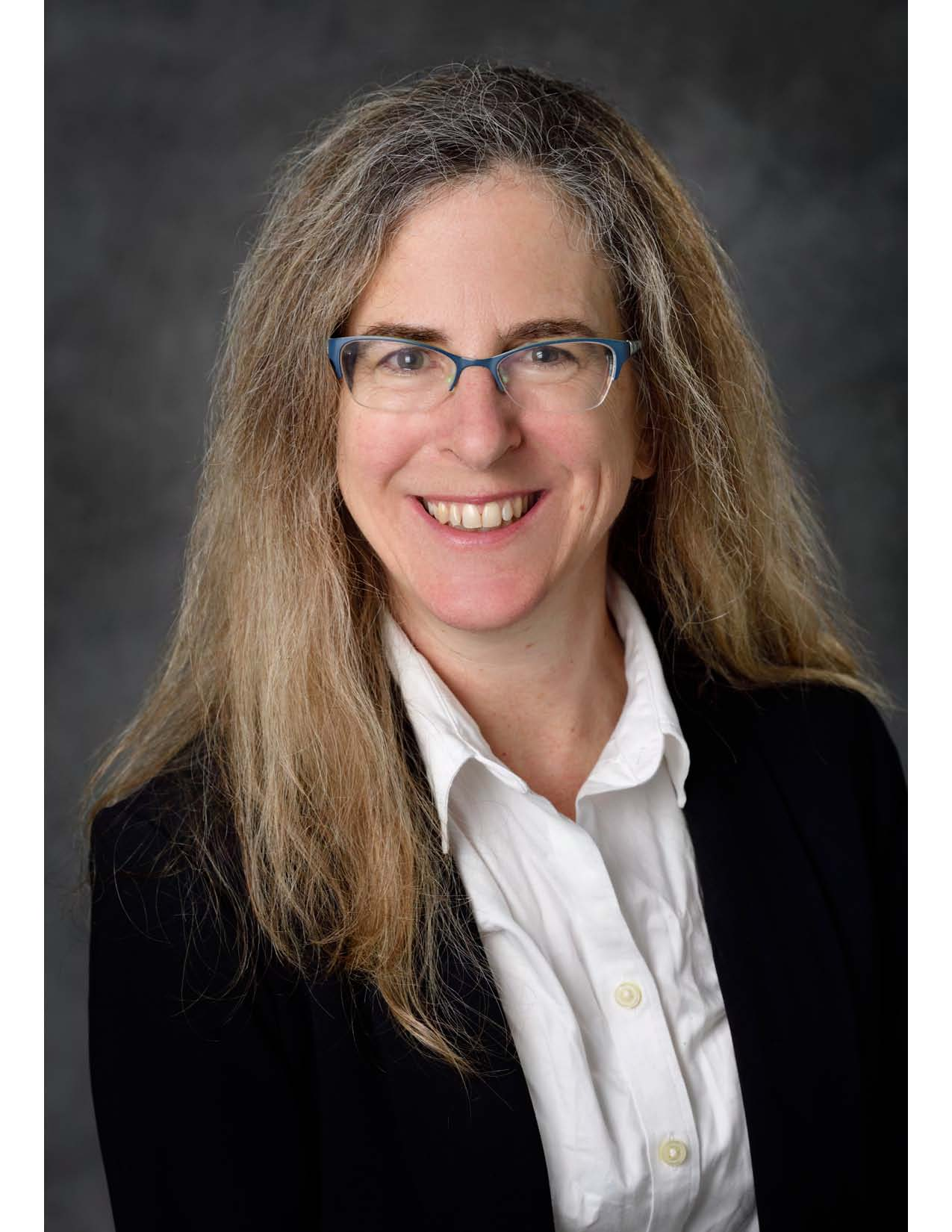
Megan Donahue (2019)

== Education and career ==
Donahue graduated in physics from the Massachusetts Institute of Technology in 1985, and completed her PhD in astrophysics from the University of Colorado Boulder in 1990 under the supervision of J. Michael Shull and John T. Stocke. After postdoctoral research at the Carnegie Institution for Science she joined the Space Telescope Science Institute for a second postdoctoral visit in 1993, and stayed on there in other capacities until joining the Michigan State faculty in 2003.

== Books ==
She is a co-author of three books in the Pearson Cosmic Perspective Series of astronomy textbooks: The Cosmic Perspective (8th ed., 2016, also published as two separate volumes), The Essential Cosmic Perspective (7th ed., 2014), and The Cosmic Perspective Fundamentals (2nd ed., 2015).

== Awards and honors ==
Donahue was the 1993 winner of the Robert J. Trumpler Award for best recent dissertation in astronomy. In 2012 she became a fellow of the American Association for the Advancement of Science, and in 2016 she was elected as a fellow of the American Physical Society.
