= Koblitz (surname) =

Koblitz or Köblitz is a German toponymic surname. It originates from any of the places named Köblitz in Upper Lusatia or Saxony, or from Köbbelitz in the Altmark, and is ultimately of Slavic origin (see Sorbian: Koblica). Notable people with the surname include:

- Ann Hibner Koblitz (born 1952), American historian
- Jörn Koblitz (born 1961), German curator and publisher
- Neal Koblitz (born 1948), American mathematician and cryptographer
