= Snežana Stanimirović =

Serbian-American astronomer

Snežana Stanimirović is a Serbian-American radio astronomer whose research focuses on the interstellar medium and intergalactic medium, including neutral hydrogen clouds and the production of cosmic dust by supernovae. She is a professor of astronomy at the University of Wisconsin–Madison, and is also the author of a comic strip aimed at encouraging children to become scientists, Galaxy Scouts: Space-Ventures with Stella and Riley.

== Education and career ==
Stanimirović is originally from Kruševac, Serbia (then part of Yugoslavia), moved to Surdulica as a child, and was a high school student at the Jovan Skerlić Gymnasium in Vladičin Han. Her work in astronomy began with high school participation in research at the Petnica Science Center. She graduated with honors in mathematics and astronomy from the University of Belgrade in 1995, and then went to Western Sydney University in Australia for doctoral study in astrophysics, completing her Ph.D. in 2000.

She completed postdoctoral research at the Arecibo Observatory through Cornell University from 1999 to 2002, and at the University of California, Berkeley from 2002 to 2006. She then joined the University of Wisconsin–Madison as an assistant professor of astronomy in 2006, was tenured as an associate professor in 2011, and promoted to full professor in 2015.

Her research involves the use of the Australian Square Kilometre Array Pathfinder, a radio telescope array in Australia, and forms part of the Local Group L-Band Survey (LGLBS) project using the Karl G. Jansky Very Large Array in the southwestern US.

== Recognition ==
Stanimirović was named as a Fellow of the American Association for the Advancement of Science in 2016, "for pioneering radio studies of interstellar gas in the Milky Way and the Magellanic Cloud and improving understanding of transitions between phases and the role of interstellar turbulence". She received a Guggenheim Fellowship in 2019.
