= Roche (crater) =

Lunar crater

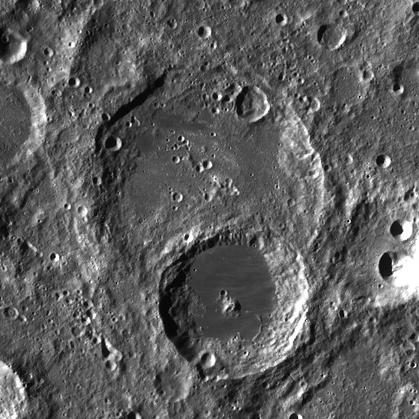
- LRO WAC image, with Roche at center and Pauli at bottom
- Coordinates: 42.3°S 136.5°E
- Diameter: 160 km
- Depth: Unknown
- Colongitude: 226° at sunrise
- Eponym: Édouard A. Roche

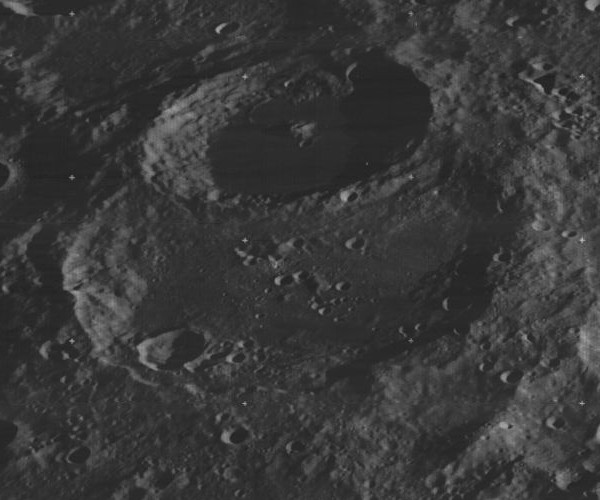
Oblique view from Lunar Orbiter 3, facing south, with Pauli at top and Roche at center

Roche is a large crater on the far side of the Moon from the Earth. The prominent crater Pauli lies across the southern rim of Roche, and the outer rampart of Pauli covers a portion of Roche's interior floor. To the north-northwest of Roche is the crater Eötvös, and just to the west-northwest lies Rosseland.

The western rim of Roche has been somewhat distorted and straightened. The rim as a whole is worn and eroded, with multiple tiny craterlets marking the surface. The satellite crater Roche B lies across the northeastern inner wall.

The interior floor of Roche is relatively level, but is also marked by several small and tiny craterlets. A grouping of these craters lies near the midpoint. Just to the northwest of this grouping is a bright patch of high-albedo material. Sections of the floor along the north-northwestern side have a lower albedo than elsewhere, usually an indication of basaltic-lava flows similar to what fills the lunar maria. The extent of this patch may actually be larger, but covered with higher-albedo ejecta.

== Satellite craters ==
By convention, these features are identified on lunar maps by placing the letter on the side of the crater midpoint that is closest to Roche.

Roche	Latitude	Longitude	Diameter
B	40.1° S	137.2° E	24 km
C	39.0° S	139.2° E	18 km
V	38.5° S	129.3° E	30 km
W	39.0° S	130.5° E	20 km
