= Jeffrey Grossman =

American engineer and professor

Professor Jeffrey Grossman
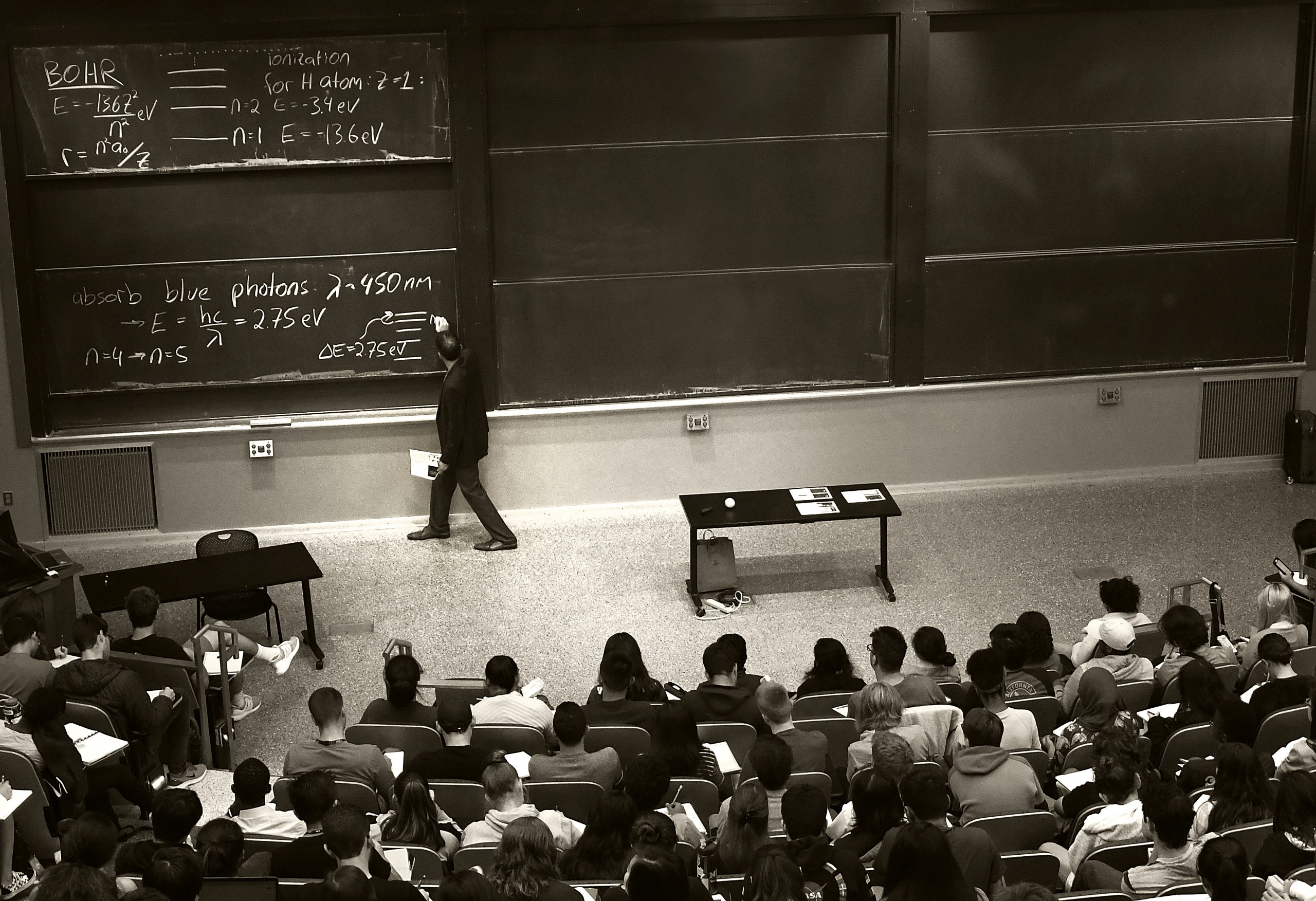
- Education: Johns Hopkins, University of Illinois
- Occupations: Professor in Environmental Systems, Professor of Materials Science and Engineering
- Website: https://gg.mit.edu/

Jeffrey Grossman is an American engineer, the Morton and Claire Goulder and Family Professor in Environmental Systems and former Head of the Department of Materials Science and Engineering at the Massachusetts Institute of Technology. He is also a MacVicar Faculty Fellow, and Principal Investigator at the Research Laboratory of Electronics.

Some of his research focuses are energy materials and nano-materials. His research has included the development of materials that can store solar energy chemically, and then release the energy at a later time as heat, a process for constructing electronic components out of coal, novel three-dimensional arrangements for solar panels, and studies on the use of graphene for water desalination.

Grossman founded MIT's Breakerspace coffee lab and teaches the course Coffee Matters: Using the Breakerspace to Brew the Perfect Cup. Grossman is also a co-founder of two companies developing membranes for efficient industrial separations, ViaSeparations and SiTration.
