= 4340 Dence =

Main-belt asteroid

Discovery
- Discovered by: C. Shoemaker
- Discovery site: Palomar Obs.
- Discovery date: 4 May 1986

Designations
- Named after: Michael R. Dence (Canadian geologist)
- Alternative designations: 1986 JZ · 1982 KF_{4} 1986 LN
- Minor planet category: main-belt · (inner) background · Phocaea

Orbital characteristics
- Epoch 23 March 2018 (JD 2458200.5)
- Uncertainty parameter 0
- Observation arc: 38.28 yr (13,983 d)
- Aphelion: 2.9475 AU
- Perihelion: 1.8408 AU
- Semi-major axis: 2.3941 AU
- Eccentricity: 0.2311
- Orbital period (sidereal): 3.70 yr (1,353 d)
- Mean anomaly: 212.55°
- Mean motion: 0° 15^{m} 57.96^{s} / day
- Inclination: 25.155°
- Longitude of ascending node: 81.012°
- Argument of perihelion: 175.79°

Physical characteristics
- Mean diameter: 8.110±0.138 km 8.37 km (calculated)
- Synodic rotation period: 7.546±0.005 h 7.558±0.0018 h (Note: Lightcurve plot (April 2008) and follow-up plot (May 2008) of (4340) Dence by Petr Pravec. Rotation period of 7.558±0.0018 and 7.5668±0.0018 hours and a brightness amplitude of 0.07±0.01 and 0.11±0.01 magnitude. Quality code of 2/2. Summary figures at the LCDB and Pravec, P.; Wolf, M.; Sarounova, L. (2008) Plots from Ondrejov data, obtained by the NEO Photometric Program and collaborating projects.); 7.5668±0.0018 h 15.473±0.005 h (poor)
- Geometric albedo: 0.155±0.028; 0.23 (assumed)
- Spectral type: SMASS = S
- Absolute magnitude (H): 12.6; 12.67±1.14; 13.1

4340 Dence, provisional designation 1986 JZ, is a background or Phocaea asteroid from the inner regions of the asteroid belt, approximately 8 kilometers (5 miles) in diameter. It was discovered on 4 May 1986, by American astronomer Carolyn Shoemaker at the Palomar Observatory in California. The S-type asteroid has a rotation period of 7.5 hours. It was named after Canadian geologist Michael R. Dence.

== Orbit and classification ==
Dence is a non-family asteroid of the main belt's background population when applying the hierarchical clustering method to its proper orbital elements. Based on osculating Keplerian orbital elements, the asteroid has also been classified as a member of the stony Phocaea family (701). It orbits the Sun in the inner asteroid belt at a distance of 1.8–2.9 AU once every 3 years and 8 months (1,353 days; semi-major axis of 2.39 AU). Its orbit has an eccentricity of 0.23 and an inclination of 25° with respect to the ecliptic. The body's observation arc begins with a precovery taken at the Siding Spring Observatory in November 1979, more than six years prior to its official discovery observation at Palomar.

== Physical characteristics ==
In the SMASS classification, Dence is a common, stony S-type asteroid.

=== Rotation period ===
Since 2008, several rotational lightcurves of Dence have been obtained from photometric observations by Czech astronomer Petr Pravec and by Maurice Clark at the observatory of the Montgomery College in Maryland, United States (U=3-/1/2/2). Analysis of the best-rated lightcurve gave a rotation period of 7.546 hours with a brightness amplitude of 0.58 magnitude (U=3-).

=== Diameter and albedo ===
According to the survey carried out by the NEOWISE mission of NASA's Wide-field Infrared Survey Explorer, Dence measures 8.110 kilometers in diameter and its surface has an albedo of 0.155, while the Collaborative Asteroid Lightcurve Link assumes an albedo of 0.23 – derived from 25 Phocaea, the parent body of the Phocaea family – and calculates a diameter of 8.37 kilometers based on an absolute magnitude of 12.6.

== Naming ==
This minor planet was named after Canadian geologist Michael R. Dence executive director of the Royal Society of Canada. He was a pioneer in the geologic investigation of ancient impact craters on the Canadian Shield (also see Sudbury Basin and Manicouagan Reservoir). The official naming citation was published by the Minor Planet Center on 30 January 1991 (M.P.C. 17656).
