= Division on Dynamical Astronomy =

Branch of the American Astronomical Society

The Division on Dynamical Astronomy (DDA) is a branch of the American Astronomical Society that focuses on the advancement of all aspects of dynamical astronomy, including celestial mechanics, solar system dynamics, stellar dynamics, as well as the dynamics of the interstellar medium and galactic dynamics, and coordination of such research with other branches of science. It awards the Brouwer Award every year, which was established to recognize outstanding contributions to the field of Dynamical Astronomy, including celestial mechanics, astrometry, geophysics, stellar systems, galactic and extra galactic dynamics. The Division also awards the Vera Rubin Early Career Prize for promise of continued excellence for an astronomer no more than 10 years beyond receipt of their doctorate.

== See also ==
- List of astronomical societies
