= Gurtina Besla =

Astrophysicist

Gurtina Besla is a theoretical astrophysicist whose research studies the dynamics of gravitationally interacting galaxies and the effects of their interactions on galaxy evolution, especially within the Local Group. Her work has also helped untangle the past history of the Local Group, suggesting that the Magellanic Clouds were latecomers to the group rather than forming with it, and that the Magellanic Stream resulted from interactions between the Magellanic Clouds rather than with the Milky Way. Educated in Canada and the United States, she works as a professor at the University of Arizona in its Department of Astronomy and Steward Observatory.

== Education and career ==
Besla went into physics "to prove to herself that she wasn’t bad at physics" after it being her worst subject in high school. At the University of Toronto, she received a bachelor's degree in astronomy and physics in 2005 with high distinction. She continued her studies in astronomy at Harvard University, where she received a master's degree in 2007 and completed her Ph.D. in 2012. Her dissertation, Modeling the Magellanic System: Insights into Galactic Accretion and Evolution, was supervised by Lars Hernquist.

She was a postdoctoral researcher at Columbia University from 2011 to 2014, before becoming an assistant professor at the University of Arizona in 2014. She was promoted to associate professor in 2020 and full professor in 2024.

== Recognition ==
Besla's doctoral dissertation won the 2013 Robert J. Trumpler Award of the Astronomical Society of the Pacific. She was the 2018 recipient of the Vera Rubin Early Career Prize of the American Astronomical Society, given "for her trail-blazing research on the origin and dynamics of the Milky Way and the Local Group of galaxies". She was a 2025 recipient of the Presidential Early Career Award for Scientists and Engineers.
