= Ronald Greeley =

Planetary geologist (1939–2011)

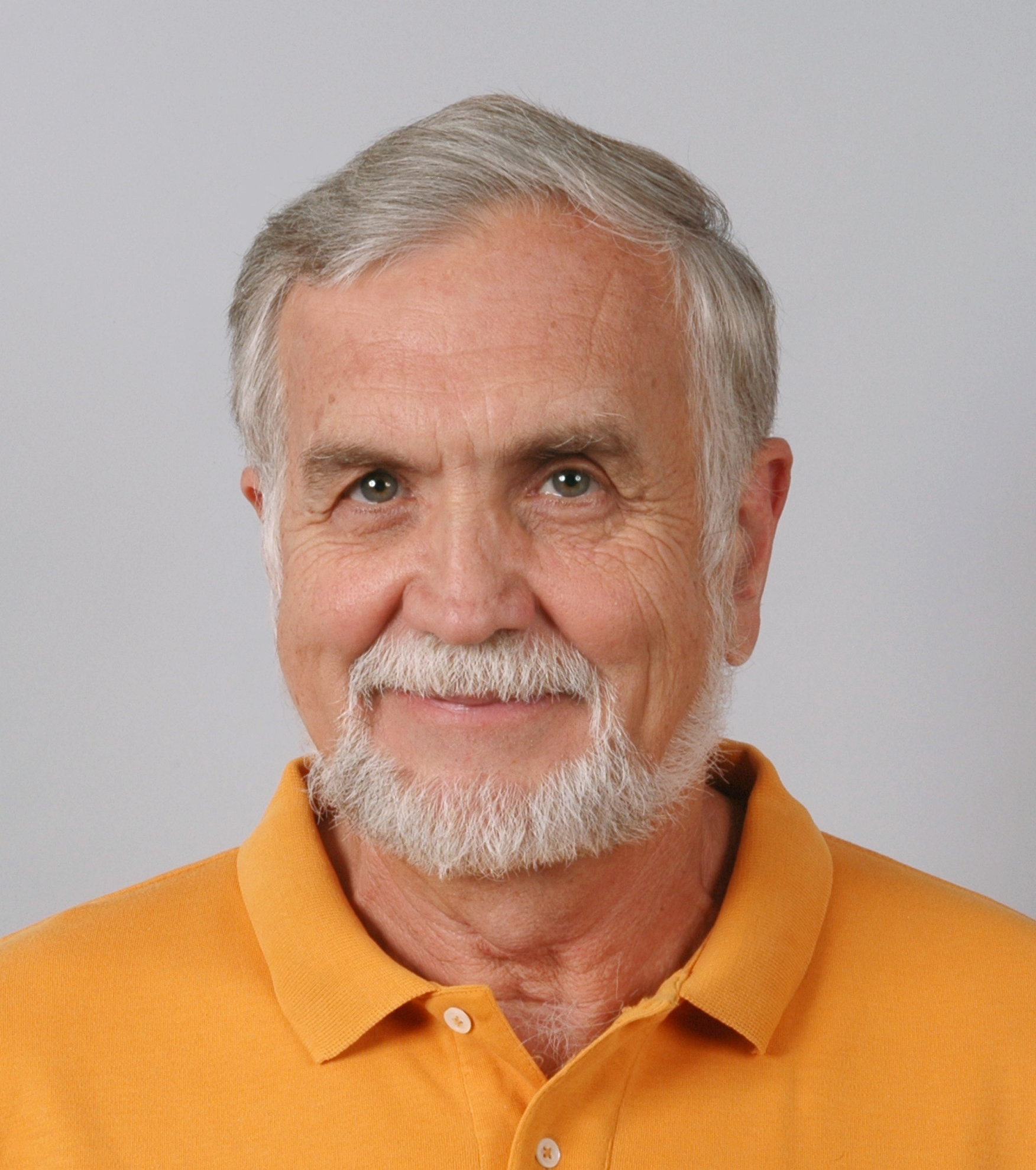
- Born: August 25, 1939; Columbus, Ohio, U.S.
- Died: October 27, 2011 (aged 72); Tempe, Arizona
- Education: Mississippi State University; University of Missouri at Rolla
- Scientific career
- Fields: Geology; Planetary sciences
- Workplaces: Standard Oil Company of California; NASA Ames Research Center; Arizona State University

Ronald Greeley (August 25, 1939 – October 27, 2011) was a Regents' Professor in the School of Earth and Space Exploration (SESE) at Arizona State University (ASU), the Director of the NASA-ASU Regional Planetary Image Facility (RPIF), and Principal Investigator of the Planetary Aeolian Laboratory at NASA-Ames Research Center. He was involved with lunar and planetary studies since 1967 and most recently focused his research on understanding planetary surface processes and geologic histories.

== Education ==
Greeley earned his B.S. degree in Geology in 1962 and his M.S. degree in geology in 1963 from Mississippi State University and earned his Ph.D. in geology from the University of Missouri at Rolla in 1966.

== Career ==
After receiving his Ph.D. in geology in 1966, Greeley worked for Standard Oil Company of California. Through his military service, he was assigned to NASA's Ames Research Center in 1967 where he worked in a civilian capacity in preparation for the Apollo missions to the Moon. He remained at NASA to conduct research in planetary geology. With the results of the planetary missions in the early 1970s, attention shifted to Mars and research on volcanism and aeolian processes through the analysis of Mariner 6, 7, and 9 data. He became a science team member on the Mars Viking mission from 1976 through 1980.

In 1977, Greeley joined the faculty at Arizona State University with a joint professorship in Geology and the Center for Meteorite Studies. His latest research focused on the wind processes on Earth, Mars, Venus, and Titan, field studies of basaltic volcanism, and photogeological mapping of the planets and satellites including Europa. He was also a science team member on the Mars Exploration Rover program and the European Space Agency's Mars Express mission.

Greeley served on various NASA and National Academy of Sciences panels to assess space science and planetary geology activities. He chaired the NASA Planetary Geology and Geophysics Management Operations Working Group, the National Academy of Sciences Committee on Lunar and Planetary Exploration, and the NASA Mars Exploration Program Analysis Group. He was co-chair of the NASA Science Definition Team for the Europa flagship mission, then the Planetary Science Subcommittee of the NASA Advisory Council and served in that capacity until his death in 2011.

Over the course of his career, Greeley wrote or co-wrote more than 400 papers and 16 books.

== Awards and honors ==
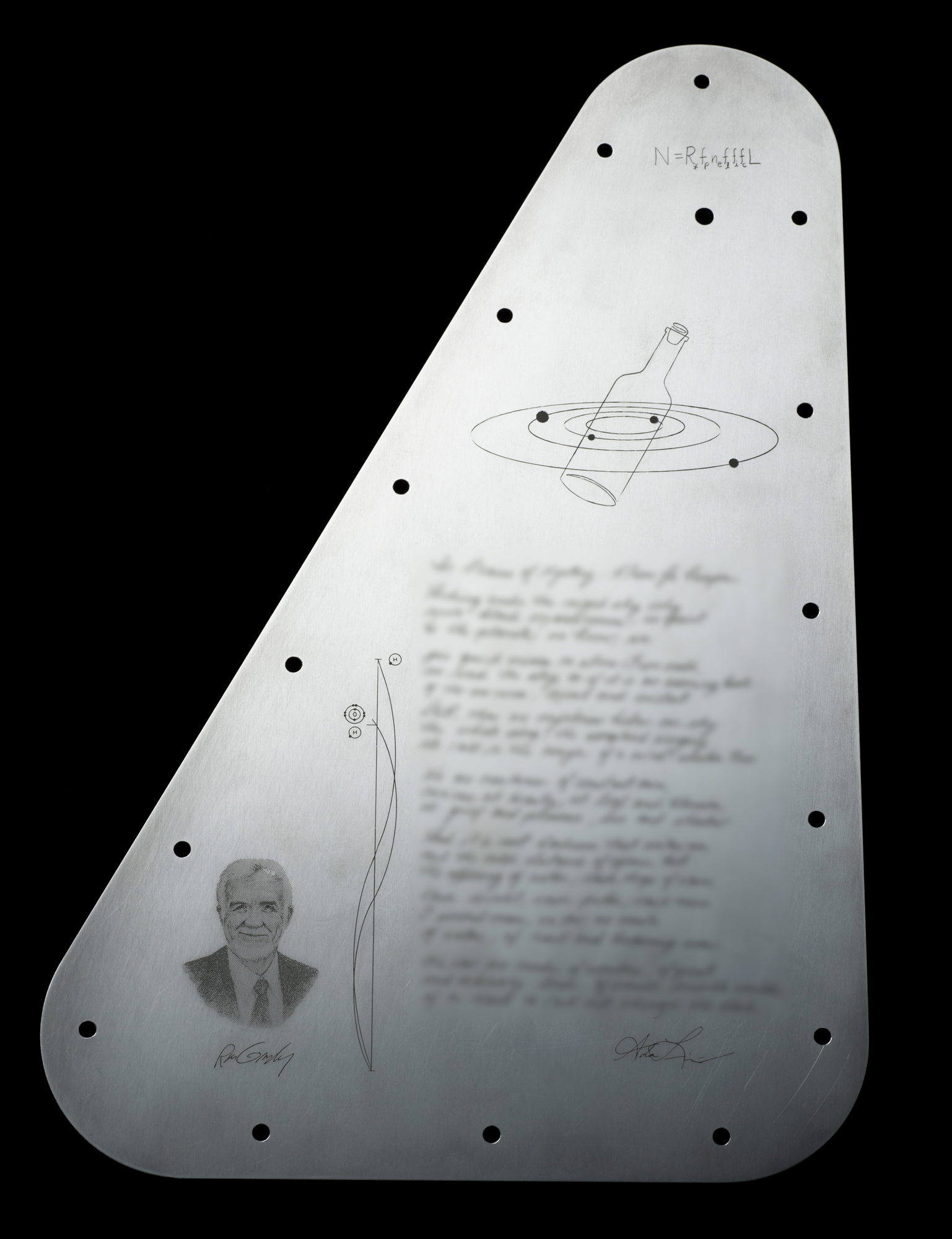
Commemorative plate on Europa Clipper

Greeley received a number of awards and honors during his career, including the G. K. Gilbert Award presented by the Planetary Geology Division of the Geological Society of America in 1997, and being named a Fellow of the American Geophysical Union in 2007 and of the American Association for the Advancement of Science in 2008. At Arizona State University, he received a Distinguished Faculty Award in 2004 and was the recipient of the Best Field Trip of the Year award at the Arizona State University School of Earth and Space Exploration in 2007. Greeley was also the recipient of numerous NASA individual, group and leadership awards. An asteroid was named 30785 Greeley in his honor in 1988. Greeley Crater, an impact crater on Mars, was named in his honor in 2015.

A commemorative plate on NASA's Europa Clipper mission features a poem by the U.S. Poet Laureate Ada Limón, waveforms of the word 'water' in 103 languages, the Drake equation, and a portrait of Ron Greeley.

== Selected works ==
- Geology on the Moon, ISBN 978-0-8510-9540-0 (1977)
- Earthlike Planets: Surfaces of Mercury, Venus, Earth, Moon, Mars, ISBN 978-0-7167-1148-3 (co-author, 1981)
- Wind as a Geological Process: On Earth, Mars, Venus and Titan, ISBN 978-0-5213-5962-7 (1987)
- Planetary Landscapes, ISBN 978-0-4120-5181-4 (1994)
- The Compact NASA Atlas of the Solar System, ISBN 978-0-5218-0633-6 (2002)
- 21st Century Astronomy, ISBN 978-0-3939-2443-5 (co-author, 2006)
- Planetary Mapping, ISBN 978-0-5213-0774-1 (editor, 2007)
- Introduction to Planetary Geomorphology, ISBN 978-0-5218-6711-5 (2013)
