= Qingde Wang =

American astronomer

Qingde "Daniel" Wang (王青德) is a professor of astronomy at the University of Massachusetts Amherst. His research focuses on the hot interstellar medium and intergalactic medium. He received his PhD at Columbia University in 1990.

Wang has won the following honors:

- 1994 Lindheimer Fellowship
- 1992 Robert J. Trumpler Award for outstanding PhD thesis
- 1990-1993, Hubble Postdoctoral Fellowship
- 1985 Nanjing University New Star Award

== Bibliography ==
A sampling of his recent publications includes:

- A Faint Discrete Source Origin for the Highly Ionized Iron Emission from the Galactic Centre Region, 2002, Nature 415, 148
- Ultraluminous X-ray Source 1E 0953.8+6918 (M81 X-9): An Intermediate-Mass Black Hole Candidate and its Environs, 2002, MNRAS 332, 764
- Chandra Observation of the Edge-on Galaxy NGC 3556 (M108): Violent Galactic Disk-Halo Interaction Revealed, 2003, ApJ 598, 969
- Detection of X-ray-Emitting Hypernova Remnants in M101, 1999, ApJL, 517, 27
- An Ultra Deep High Resolution X-ray Image of M101: X-ray Source Population in a Late-type Spiral, 1999, ApJ, 523, 121
- Structure and Evolution of Hot Gas in 30 Doradus, 1999, ApJL, 510, 139
