= Kelle Cruz =

American physicist

Kelle Cruz is an astrophysicist who specializes in studying brown dwarfs. She currently works as an associate professor at Hunter College in New York City. With her study of brown dwarfs, Cruz hopes to better understand planets outside the Solar System and map out the universe, saying, "I hope that what I’m doing in our little bit of the galaxy is similar to what the explorers did by discovering and mapping the New World and North America." Kelle is co-PI of the Brown Dwarfs in New York City (BDNYC) research group.

== Publications ==
1. 2MASS 22344161+4041387AB: A Wide, Young, Accreting, Low-mass Binary in the LkHa233 Group
2. Measuring Tiny Mass Accretion Rates Onto Young Brown Dwarfs.
3. Young L. Dwarfs Identified in the Field: A Preliminary Low-Gravity, Optical Spectral Sequence from L0 to L5.
4. A Sample of Very Young Field L Dwarfs and Implications for the Brown Dwarf "Lithium Test" at Early Ages
5. The Brown Dwarf Kinematics Project (BDKP)I. Proper Motions and Tangential Velocities for a Large Sample of Late-type M, L, and T Dwarfs

== Awards and honors ==
- Fellow of the American Astronomical Society, 2022
- Spitzer Fellowship, 2007
- NSF Astronomy and Astrophysics Postdoctoral Fellowship, 2004
- NSF Graduate Research Fellowship, 2001
- NSF Graduate Research Fellowship (Honorable Mention), 2000
- APS Corporate Minority Scholar, 1998 & 1999

== See also ==
- List of astronomers (includes astrophysicists)
