= Pauli (crater) =

Impact crater on the Moon

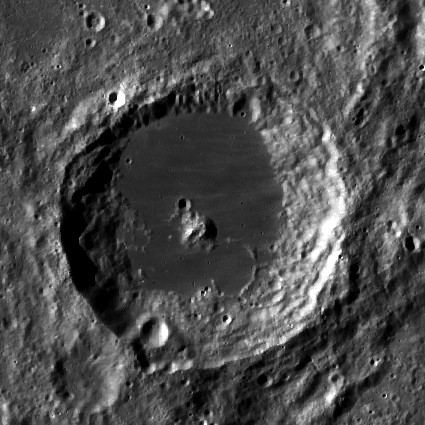
- LRO WAC image
- Coordinates: 44.5°S 137.5°E
- Diameter: 84 km
- Depth: Unknown
- Colongitude: 224° at sunrise
- Formation: Lower Imbrian
- Eponym: Wolfgang E. Pauli

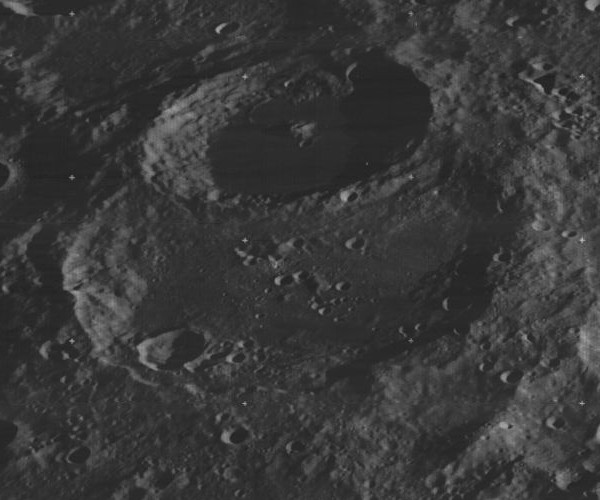
Oblique view from Lunar Orbiter 3, facing south, with Pauli at top and Roche at center

Pauli is a lunar impact crater that is located on the Moon's far side. It lies about halfway between the lunar equator and southern pole, across the southern rim of a larger walled plain called Roche.

On the lunar geologic timescale, Pauli dates to the Lower Imbrian period. This crater has a well-defined outer rim that is only mildly worn by impact erosion. A small crater lies on the inner side along the south, and another on the opposite face of the crater to the north. There is some slight terracing along the southeast inner wall, but the remainder displays more of a radially grooved appearance. The inner wall is narrower along the northern side where it overlies Roche.

The interior floor has been flooded with lava, leaving a low-albedo surface that is darker than the surrounding terrain. In this respect it is similar to the crater Jules Verne located about four crater diameters to the northeast. There is a low ridge structure near the midpoint, and the remains of a ghost crater in the southeastern part of the floor.

== Satellite craters ==
By convention these features are identified on lunar maps by placing the letter on the side of the crater midpoint that is closest to Pauli.

Pauli	Latitude	Longitude	Diameter
E	44.1° S	141.4° E	24 km
