= The Meteoritical Society =

Non-profit organization

Meteoritical Society
- Formation: 1933; 93 years ago
- Legal status: Active
- Headquarters: Chantilly, Virginia, USA
- Coordinates: 38°54′32.07″N 77°27′08.09″W
- Region served: Worldwide
- Members: 900+
- Official language: English
- President: Brigitte Zanda
- Main organ: Meteoritical Bulletin
- Website: meteoritical.org

The Meteoritical Society is a non-profit scholarly organization founded in 1933 to promote research and education in planetary science with emphasis on studies of meteorites and other extraterrestrial materials that further our understanding of the origin and history of the Solar System.

== Members ==
The membership of the society comprises over 1,000 scientists and amateur enthusiasts from over 52 countries who are interested in a wide range of planetary science topics. Members interests include meteorites, cosmic dust, asteroids and comets, natural satellites, planets, impact events, and the origins of the Solar System.

== Activities ==
The Meteoritical Society is the organization that records all known meteorites in its Meteoritical Bulletin. The Society also publishes one of the world's leading planetary science journals, Meteoritics & Planetary Science, and is a cosponsor with the Geochemical Society of the renowned journal Geochimica et Cosmochimica Acta.

The Society presents or cosponsors seven awards each year:

- The Leonard Medal, awarded since 1966 in honor of the first President of the Society, Frederick C. Leonard, is given for outstanding contributions to the science of meteoritics and closely allied fields.
- The Barringer Medal, awarded since 1984 and cosponsored by the Barringer Crater Company, recognizes outstanding work in the field of impact cratering and/or work that has led to a better understanding of impact phenomena. The Prize is given in memory of D. Moreau Barringer Sr. and his son D. Moreau Barringer Jr.
- The Nier Prize recognizes outstanding research in meteoritics and allied fields by young (under age 35) scientists. It has been awarded since 1996 in honor of the late physicist and geochemist, Alfred O. C. Nier.
- The Paul Pellas-Graham Ryder Award, cosponsored by the Planetary Geology Division of the Geological Society of America, is given for undergraduate and graduate students who are first author of a planetary science paper published in a peer-reviewed scientific journal. It has been given since 2000, and honors the memories of the incomparable meteoriticist Paul Pellas and lunar scientist Graham Ryder.
- The Meteoritical Society's Service Award is for members who have advanced the goals of the Society to promote research and education in meteoritics and planetary science in ways other than by conducting scientific research. The first award was presented in 2006.
- The Gordon A. McKay Award is for the best oral presentation by a student at the annual meeting of the society. It honors the memory of planetary scientist Gordon A. McKay. The first award was presented in 2009.
- The Jessberger Award is awarded to a mid-career female scientist in the field of isotope cosmochemistry. The award was endowed by the family of geochemist Elmar Jessberger. The award is given every other year.

The Meteoritical Society hosts an annual meeting during the summer, which generally alternates between North America and Europe. It has also held meetings in South Africa, Australia, Brazil, and Japan. The next meeting will be August 13–18, 2023 at UCLA.

== See also ==
- Meteoritics
