= List of members of the National Academy of Sciences (anthropology) =

This list is a subsection of the List of members of the National Academy of Sciences, which includes more than 7,000 members and international members of the United States National Academy of Sciences, both living and deceased, each affiliated with one of 31 disciplinary sections. Members are listed under their primary section, and each person's name, primary institution, and election year are given. For deceased members, the year of death is noted.

== Anthropology ==
Name	Institution	Year
Robert McCormick Adams (died 2018)	University of California, San Diego	1970
Larissa Adler-Lomnitz (died 2019)	Universidad Nacional Autonoma de Mexico	2010
Susan Alberts	Duke University	2019
William F. Albright (died 1971)	Johns Hopkins University	1955
Jim Allen (died 2025)	La Trobe University	2012
Jeanne Altmann	Princeton University	2003
Juan Luis Arsuaga	Instituto de Salud Carlos III	2002
Berhane Asfaw	Rift Valley Institute	2008
Scott Atran	Artis International	2022
Paul T. Baker (died 2007)	Pennsylvania State University	1980
Ofer Bar-Yosef (died 2020)	Harvard University	2001
Cynthia Beall	Case Western Reserve University	1996
Anna K. Behrensmeyer	Smithsonian National Museum of Natural History	2020
Brent Berlin	University of Georgia	1980
Ignacio Bernal (died 1992)	National Museum of Anthropology	1980
Yonas Beyene Gebremichael	Centre Francais des Etudes Ethiopiennes	2022
Lewis R. Binford (died 2011)	Southern Methodist University	2001
Monique Borgerhoff Mulder	Max Planck Institute for Evolutionary Anthropology	2022
Luis A. Borrero	Consejo Nacional de Investigaciones Cientificas y Tecnicas, (CONICET)	2021
Robert T. Boyd	Arizona State University	2025
Robert J. Braidwood (died 2003)	The University of Chicago	1964
Victoria Bricker	Tulane University	1991
Alison S. Brooks	The George Washington University	2020
James Allison Brown	Northwestern University	2013
Jane Buikstra	Arizona State University	1987
Robert Carneiro (died 2020)	American Museum of Natural History	1999
Napoleon Chagnon (died 2019)	University of Missouri	2012
Kwang-chih Chang (died 2001)	Harvard University	1979
Dorothy Cheney (died 2018)	University of Pennsylvania	2015
J. Desmond Clark (died 2002)	University of California, Berkeley	1986
J. G. D. Clark (died 1995)	University of California, Berkeley	1986
Michael Coe (died 2019)	Yale University	1986
Elizabeth Colson (died 2016)	University of California, Berkeley	1977
Harold Conklin (died 2016)	Yale University	1976
Linda S. Cordell (died 2013)	University of Colorado	2006
Patricia Crown	The University of New Mexico	2014
Roy D'Andrade (died 2016)	University of Connecticut	1998
Frederica de Laguna (died 2004)	Bryn Mawr College	1975
Frans de Waal (died 2024)	Emory University	2004
Anthony Di Fiore	The University of Texas at Austin	2021
Robert Drennan (died 2025)	University of Pittsburgh	2004
William Dressler	University of Alabama	2023
Timothy K. Earle	Northwestern University	2023
Fred Eggan (died 1991)	University of Chicago	1963
Peter T. Ellison	Harvard University	2006
W. Tecumseh S. Fitch	University of Vienna	2025
Kent Flannery	University of Michigan	1978
George M. Foster (died 2006)	University of California, Berkeley	1976
Catherine S. Fowler	University of Nevada, Reno	2011
Robin Fox (died 2024)	Rutgers University	2013
Charles Frake (died 2021)	University at Buffalo	1986
Marcella Frangipane	Accademia Nazionale dei Lincei	2013
George Frison (died 2020)	University of Wyoming	1997
Victoria Fromkin (died 2000)	University of California, Los Angeles	1996
Thomas V. Gamkrelidze (died 2021)	Georgian National Academy of Sciences	2006
Stanley Garn (died 2007)	University of Michigan	1976
Ralph Garruto	Binghamton University, State University of New York	1997
Clifford Geertz (died 2006)	Institute for Advanced Study	1973
Diane Gifford-Gonzalez	University of California, Santa Cruz	2024
Melvyn Goldstein	Case Western Reserve University	2009
Ward Goodenough (died 2013)	University of Pennsylvania	1971
Morris Goodman (died 2010)	Wayne State University	2002
Jack Goody (died 2015)	University of Cambridge	2004
R. C. Green (died 2009)	University of Auckland	1984
Joseph Greenberg (died 2001)	Stanford University	1965
Donald K. Grayson	University of Washington	2011
James Bennett Griffin (died 1997)	University of Michigan	1968
Sonia Guillén	Museo Leymebamba	2012
Jane Guyer (died 2024)	Johns Hopkins University	2008
Mary Haas (died 1996)	University of California, Berkeley	1978
Kenneth L. Hale (died 2001)	Massachusetts Institute of Technology	1990
Raymond Hames	University of Nebraska-Lincoln	2020
Eugene A. Hammel (died 2025)	University of California, Berkeley	1983
Henry Harpending (died 2016)	University of Utah	1996
Emil Haury (died 1992)	University of Arizona	1956
Kristen Hawkes	University of Utah	2002
Henry M. Hoenigswald (died 2003)	University of Pennsylvania	1988
Frank Hole	Yale University	1981
Ralph Holloway (died 2025)	Columbia University	2015
F. Clark Howell (died 2007)	University of California, Berkeley	1972
William W. Howells (died 2005)	Harvard University	1967
Sarah Hrdy	University of California, Davis	1990
Frederick S. Hulse (died 1990)	University of Arizona	1974
Judith Irvine	University of Michigan	2016
Nina Jablonski	The Pennsylvania State University - University Park	2021
Jesse D. Jennings (died 1997)	University of Oregon	1977
Lan-Po Jia (died 2001)	Academia Sinica	1994
Panagiotis Karkanas	American School of Classical Studies at Athens	2018
Paul Kay	University of California, Berkeley	1997
Raymond C. Kelly	University of Michigan	2004
Patrick Kirch	University of Hawaii at Manoa	1990
Timothy A. Kohler	Washington State University	2022
Conrad Kottak	University of Michigan	2008
Wilton M. Krogman (died 1987)	University of Pennsylvania	1966
Christopher W. Kuzawa	Harvard University	2018
Clark Spencer Larsen	Ohio State University	2016
Richard B. Lee	University of Toronto	2011
Dana Lepofsky	Simon Fraser University	2025
Miguel Leon-Portilla (died 2019)	National Autonomous University of Mexico	1995
Claude Lévi-Strauss (died 2009)	Collège de France	1967
Olga Linares (died 2014)	Smithsonian Tropical Research Institute	1992
David O. Lordkipanidze	Georgian National Museum	2007
Floyd Lounsbury (died 1998)	Yale University	1969
Owen Lovejoy	Kent State University	2007
Richard MacNeish (died 2001)	Andover Foundation for Archaeological Research	1974
Fredrick K. Manthi	National Museums of Kenya	2024
Linda Manzanilla	National Autonomous University of Mexico	2003
Joyce Marcus	University of Michigan	1997
Fiona Marshall	Washington University in St. Louis	2017
Thomas McDade	Northwestern University	2021
Margaret Mead (died 1978)	University of Rhode Island	1975
David J. Meltzer	Southern Methodist University	2009
Rene Millon (died 2016)	University of Rochester	2001
George R. Milner	The Pennsylvania State University - University Park	2019
Craig Morris (died 2006)	American Museum of Natural History	1998
Michael E. Moseley (died 2024)	University of Florida	2000
Hallam L. Movius (died 1987)	Harvard University	1957
George Murdock (died 1985)	University of Pittsburgh	1964
Robert M. Netting (died 1995)	University of Arizona	1993
James F. O'Connell	University of Utah	2006
Douglas Oliver (died 2009)	Harvard University	1979
Mehmet Özdoğan	Istanbul University	2005
Kenneth L. Pike (died 2000)	Summer Institute of Linguistics	1985
Dolores Piperno	Smithsonian Institution	2005
Stephen Plog	University of Virginia	2006
T. Douglas Price	University of Wisconsin–Madison	2018
Leopold Pospisil (died 2021)	Yale University	1984
Anne E. Pusey	Duke University	2022
Elsa Redmond	American Museum of Natural History	2014
Gerardo Reichel-Dolmatoff (died 1994)	University of California, Los Angeles	1976
Colin Renfrew (died 2024)	University of Cambridge	1996
Victoria Reyes-García	Universitat Autonoma de Barcelona	2021
Torben C. Rick	Smithsonian Institution	2023
John Milton Roberts (died 1990)	University of Pittsburgh	1982
A. Kimball Romney (died 2023)	University of California, Irvine	1995
Benjamin Irving Rouse (died 2006)	Yale University	1962
Jeremy Sabloff	University of Pennsylvania	1994
Marshall Sahlins (resigned)	University of Chicago	1991
Anne Salmond	University of Auckland	2009
Francisco Mauro Salzano (died 2018)	Federal University of Rio Grande do Sul	1999
William Sanders (died 2008)	Pennsylvania State University	1985
Daniel H. Sandweiss	University of Maine	2024
Romuald Schild (died 2021)	Polish Academy of Sciences	1998
Robert Seyfarth	University of Pennsylvania	2017
Harry L. Shapiro (died 1990)	American Museum of Natural History	1949
Chet C. Sherwood	The George Washington University	2021
Joan Silk	Arizona State University	2022
Elwyn Simons (died 2016)	Duke University	1981
G. William Skinner (died 2008)	University of California, Davis	1980
Bruce D. Smith	Smithsonian Institution	2003
Himladevi Soodyall	Academy of Science of South Africa	2022
Charles S. Spencer	American Museum of Natural History	2007
Edward H. Spicer (died 1983)	University of Arizona	1975
Melford Spiro (died 2014)	University of California, San Diego	1982
Alexander Spoehr (died 1992)	University of Pittsburgh	1972
Charles Stanish	University of South Florida	2010
T. D. Stewart (died 1997)	Smithsonian Institution	1962
Mary C. Stiner	University of Arizona	2025
Anne Stone	Arizona State University	2016
Mark Stoneking	Claude Bernard University Lyon 1	2020
Karen B. Strier	University of Wisconsin–Madison	2005
Gen Suwa	The University of Tokyo	2016
Stanley Tambiah (died 2014)	Harvard University	1994
David Hurst Thomas	American Museum of Natural History	1989
Sarah Tishkoff	University of Pennsylvania	2017
Phillip V. Tobias (died 2012)	University of the Witwatersrand	1987
Erik Trinkaus	Washington University in St. Louis	1996
Jenny Tung	Max Planck Institute for Evolutionary Anthropology	2024
Peter Ungar	University of Arkansas	2024
Evon Z. Vogt (died 2004)	Harvard University	1979
Alan Walker (died 2017)	Pennsylvania State University	2003
Anthony Wallace (died 2015)	University of Pennsylvania	1973
Sherwood L. Washburn (died 2000)	University of California, Berkeley	1963
Patty Jo Watson (died 2024)	Washington University in St. Louis	1988
Waldo Rudolph Wedel (died 1996)	Smithsonian Institution	1965
Fred Wendorf (died 2015)	Southern Methodist University	1987
Eske Willerslev	University of Copenhagen	2014
Elizabeth S. Wing	University of Florida	2006
Tim White	University of California, Berkeley	2000
John Whiting (died 1999)	Harvard University	1987
Pauline Wiessner	University of Utah	2014
Gordon Willey (died 2002)	Harvard University	1960
Eric Wolf (died 1999)	Lehman College	1995
Henry Wright	University of Michigan	1994
Nai Xia (died 1985)	Chinese Academy of Social Sciences	1984
Douglas Yen (died 2023)	Australian National University	1985
Melinda A. Zeder	National Museum of Natural History	2012
