= School of Earth and Space Exploration =

Academic unit of Arizona State University

- Type: Academic unit of The College of Liberal Arts and Sciences
- Established: 2006
- Parent institution: Arizona State University
- Director: Ramón Arrowsmith
- Undergraduates: 1,069
- Postgraduates: 119
- Location: 781 E. Terrace Mall, Tempe, Arizona, United States
- Website: sese.asu.edu

The School of Earth and Space Exploration (SESE) is an academic unit of The College of Liberal Arts and Sciences at Arizona State University. It was established in 2006 by university president Michael M. Crow. As part of Crow's New American University model, the focus areas of SESE include research in both Earth and space exploration. The school is located on ASU's Tempe campus and is primarily housed in Interdisciplinary Science and Technology Building 4.

== Academics ==
The School of Earth and Space Exploration offers eight undergraduate degrees and twelve graduate programs in a variety of interdisciplinary fields, including astronomy, geology, and systems engineering. As of 2025, there were 1,069 undergraduates and 119 graduate students in SESE programs, while over 6,000 students were enrolled in at least one class offered by the school.

== Involvement in space exploration missions ==
The School of Earth and Space Exploration has been involved in a number of space exploration missions, including Psyche (which was led by the school), OSIRIS-REx, and Europa Clipper. Through SESE, ASU is in the top 2% for NASA-funded research expenditures.

In 2022, the US Space Force selected ASU and SESE to be a member of its University Partnership Program.

== Leadership ==
The first director of the School of Earth and Space Exploration was Kip Hodges, who directed the school from its founding in 2006 to 2013. He was succeeded by Lindy Elkins-Tanton, who stepped down from the director role in 2019 to become the principal investigator on the Psyche mission. Following Elkins-Tanton, Meenakshi Wadhwa served in the role until 2025, when she departed to become the vice chancellor for Marine Sciences at UC San Diego. The current director is Ramón Arrowsmith.
