= ASU College of Liberal Arts and Sciences =

College of Arizona State University

Coordinates: 33°25′19.66″N 111°53′15.51″W

The College of Liberal Arts and Sciences at Arizona State University
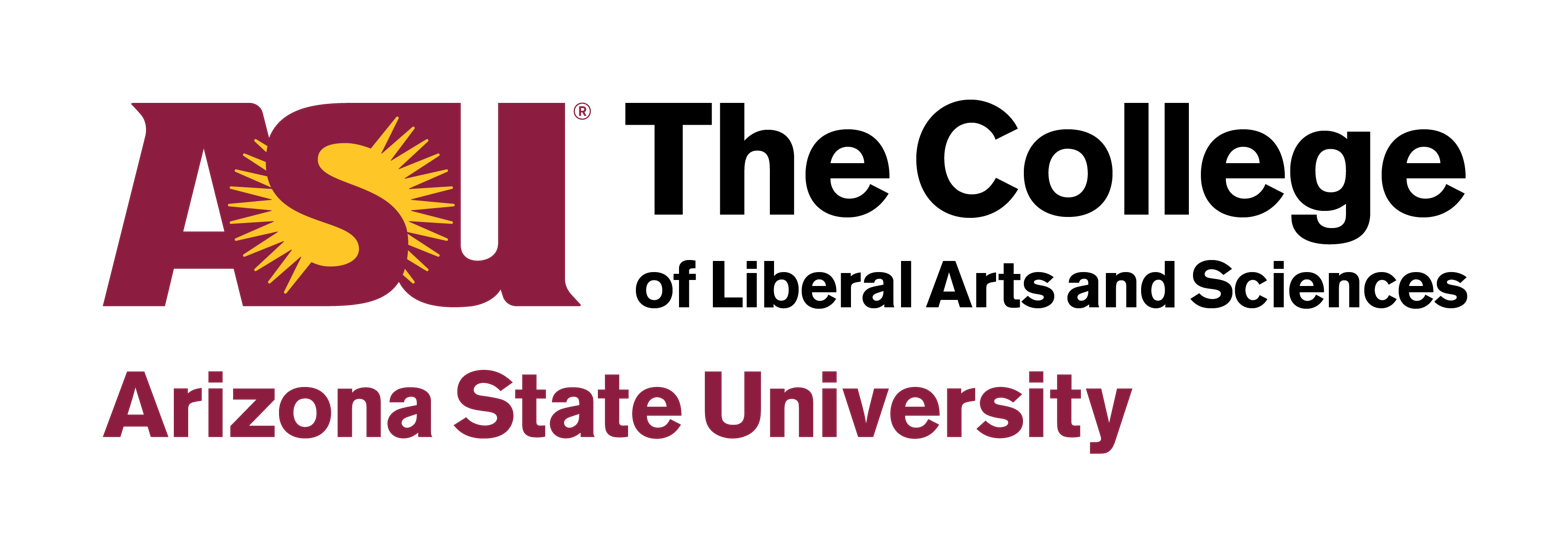
- Type: Public
- Established: 1954
- Dean: Kenro Kusumi
- Faculty: 1,394
- Students: 31,501
- Location: Tempe, Arizona, United States
- Campus: Arizona State University
- Website: https://thecollege.asu.edu/

The College of Liberal Arts and Sciences at ASU is the largest college at Arizona State University and includes 21 schools and departments. Students majoring in The College make up 19 percent of all campus immersion students and 24 percent of all online students at ASU.

The College is home to three academic divisions including the humanities, natural sciences and social sciences. Within these divisions are over 50 research centers and institutes. The College offers 100+ undergraduate majors and 150+ graduate degrees.

As of fall 2022, The College's total student enrollment was 31,501. As of fall 2022, The College's first-year retention rate was 86%.

== Organization ==
The College of Liberal Arts and Sciences is headed by Dean Kenro Kusumi. Each of the three academic divisions is led by a divisional dean:

- Dean Jeffrey Cohen, Humanities
- Dean Magda Hinojosa, Social Sciences
- Dean Dan Cox, Natural Sciences

== Location ==
The College of Liberal Arts and Sciences is located within Armstrong Hall on McAllister Avenue, as part of ASU's Tempe campus.

== Notable people ==
=== Faculty* ===
- Greg Asner, National Academy of Sciences (NAS) member, 2013.
- H. Russell Bernard, NAS member, 2010.
- Robert Boyd, NAS member, 2025.
- Jane Buikstra, NAS member, 1987.
- Natalie Diaz, MacArthur Fellow, 2018; Pulitzer Prize for Poetry, 2021.
- Lindy Elkins-Tanton, NAS Arthur L. Day Prize and Lectureship, 2020; NAS member, 2021.
- James Elser, NAS member, 2019.
- Stewart Fotheringham, NAS member, 2013.
- Nancy Grimm, NAS member, 2019.
- Michael Goodchild, NAS member, 2002.
- Lee Hartwell, NAS member, 1987; The Nobel Prize in Physiology or Medicine, 2001.
- Bert Hoelldobler, NAS member, 1998; Pulitzer Prize for General Nonfiction, 1991.
- Mitchell Jackson, Pulitzer Prize for Feature Writing, 2021.
- Michael Lynch, NAS member, 2009.
- Alexandra Navrotsky, NAS member, 1993.
- Rebecca Sandefur, MacArthur Fellow, 2018.
- Joan Silk, NAS member, 2022.
- Anne Stone, NAS member, 2016.
- B.L. Turner, NAS member, 1995.
- Polly Wiessner, NAS member, 2014.
- Frank Wilczek, MacArthur Fellow, 1982; NAS member, 1990; The Nobel Prize in Physics, 2004.
- Kelin Whipple, NAS member 2025

*This list includes only current and living faculty at The College who have received a Nobel Prize, Pulitzer Prize or MacArthur Fellowship or who are members of the National Academy of Sciences.

== Academic Units ==
- American Indian Studies
- Department of Aerospace Studies
- Department of English
- Department of Military Science
- Department of Naval Science
- Department of Physics
- Department of Psychology
- Hugh Downs School of Human Communication
- School of Civic and Economic Thought and Leadership
- School of Earth and Space Exploration
- School of Geographical Sciences and Urban Planning
- School of Historical, Philosophical and Religious Studies
- School of Human Evolution and Social Change
- School of International Letters and Cultures
- School of Life Sciences
- School of Mathematical and Statistical Sciences
- School of Molecular Sciences
- School of Politics and Global Studies
- School of Social Transformation
- School of Transborder Studies
- T. Denny Sanford School of Social and Family Dynamics

== Research Centers and Institutes ==
- American Indian Policy Institute
- Arizona Center for Medieval and Renaissance Studies
- Beyond: Center for Fundamental Concepts in Science
- Biodiversity Knowledge Integration Center
- Buseck Center for Meteorite Studies
- Center for American Civics
- Center for American Institutions
- Center for Archaeology and Society
- Center for Behavior, Institutions and the Environment
- Center for Bioarchaeological Research
- Center for Biodiversity Outcomes
- Center for Bioenergy and Photosynthesis
- Center for Biological Physics
- Center for Biology and Society
- Center for Child and Family Success
- Center for Digital Antiquity
- Center for Education Through Exploration
- Center for Evolution and Medicine
- Center for Gender Equity in Science and Technology
- Center for Global Discovery and Conservation Science
- Center for Global Health
- Center for Imagination in the Borderlands
- Center for Indian Education
- Center for Jewish Studies
- Center of Muslim Experience in the United States
- Center for Public Humanities
- Center for Social Dynamics and Complexity
- Center for Social Science Research
- Center for Strategic Communication
- Center for the Study of Economic Liberty
- Center for the Study of Religion and Conflict
- Center for Work and Democracy
- Chinese Language Flagship Center
- Desert Humanities Initiative
- Future Security Initiative
- Global Drylands Center
- Hispanic Research Center
- Humanities Lab
- Humanities Institute
- Institute for Social Science Research
- Institute of Human Origins
- Interplanetary Initiative
- Lincoln Center for Applied Ethics
- Melikian Center: Russian, Eurasian and East European Studies
- Navrotsky Eyring Center for Materials of the Universe
- Project Humanities
- REACH Institute
- Simon A. Levin Mathematical, Computational and Modeling Sciences Center
- Spatial Analysis Research Center
- The Asia Center
- Urban Climate Research Center
- Virginia G. Piper Center for Creative Writing

== Rankings ==
The following rankings are for Arizona State University overall. Rankings directly connected to disciplines and programs within The College of Liberal Arts and Sciences are listed.

Higher Education Research and Development Rankings

- No. 1 in transdisciplinary sciences
- No. 1 in anthropology.
- No. 3 in geological and earth sciences.
- No. 3 in social sciences.
- No. 9 in humanities.

U.S. News & World Report (2023):

- No. 6 in geochemistry.
- No. 8 in geology.
- No. 13 in undergraduate teaching.
- No. 14 in graduate schools for earth sciences.
- No. 16 in first-year experiences.

== Accelerated Programs at The College ==
Accelerated degree programs streamline a student's path from an undergraduate program to a master's degree. By combining undergraduate and graduate coursework in their senior year for dual credit, students can potentially save up to an entire year of schooling and receive both degrees in as little as five years. Students can view available pathways at the accelerated degrees website: https://thecollege.asu.edu/degrees/accelerated. This website is updated regularly as new accelerated degree options are added.
