= George Milner =

George Milner may refer to:

- George Milner (British Army officer) (1760–1836), general officer of the British Army
- George Milner (footballer) (1938–2005), Australian rules footballer
- George R. Milner, archaeologist
