= Ernst K. Zinner =

Austrian astrophysicist

- Born: January 30, 1937; Steyr, Austria
- Died: July 30, 2015 (aged 78); Saint Louis, Missouri
- Education: Vienna University of Technology; Washington University in St. Louis
- Occupation: Astrophysics
- Spouse: Brigitte Wopenka
- Children: 1

Ernst Kunibert Zinner (30 January 1937 – 30 July 2015) was an Austrian astrophysicist, known for his pioneering work in the analysis of stardust in the laboratory. He long had a position in the United States at the Laboratory for Space Physics (later part of the McDonnell Center for the Space Sciences) at Washington University in St. Louis, Missouri, where he had earned his doctorate. He came to the United States in the 1960s for graduate work. In addition, Zinner regularly taught at European universities, and other American institutions.

== Personal life ==
Zinner was born on 30 January 1937 at Steyr, Austria, a small town about 100 miles west of Vienna. Although his father, Kunibert Zinner, was a renowned sculptor, Ernst was more interested as a boy in nature and science. Zinner's four younger siblings, and other relatives, live in Austria.

While on sabbatical later in his career, he met Brigitte Wopenka, a faculty member of the Institute of Analytical Chemistry in Vienna. She returned with him to the United States and they married in 1980. They had a son.

== Education and career ==
Zinner obtained an undergraduate degree in physics from the Vienna University of Technology and started working. In the mid-1960s, he moved to St. Louis, Missouri to attend Washington University in St. Louis for graduate studies. He earned his Ph.D. there in 1972 in high energy physics.

That year he was invited by Robert M. Walker to work at the Laboratory for Space Physics (later part of the McDonnell Center for the Space Sciences) at Washington University.

He also held positions at:

- Max Planck Institute for Nuclear Physics (1980)
- Vienna University of Technology (1980–82)
- University of Pavia (1989)
- University of Bern (1994)
- Australian National University (1995)
- Max Planck Institute for Chemistry (2001, 03, 04)
- National Museum of Natural History (France) (2006)
- Carnegie Institution for Science (2010)
- University of Perugia (2011)
- University of Granada (2013)

Zinner continued to work at the McDonnell Center for the Space Sciences for the rest of his career, in 1989 being named as a Research Professor of Physics and Earth and Planetary Sciences. He retired early in 2015.

Zinner was a member of the American Association for the Advancement of Science, the American Geophysical Union, and Sigma Xi. He was also a fellow of the American Physical Society, the Meteoritical Society, the Geochemical Society, and the European Association of Geochemistry.

Zinner had mantle cell lymphoma for the last 19 years of his life. He died on 30 July 2015 at the age of 78.

== Research ==
Zinner's PhD research was in high energy physics. He subsequently studied the effects that the environment within the Solar System would have on the Moon and the parent bodies of meteors, using nuclear particle tracks, micrometeoid craters, and elements in the solar wind. His later research was focused on the information contained in presolar grains carried by early meteorites. These grains were formed in atmospheres and explosions of stars outside of the Solar System. They can provide information about the history of stellar nucleosynthesis and the formation of the Solar System.

Since 1974, Zinner's research has involved Ion microprobe analysis. He has worked with the Cameca IMS 3f instrument since 1982, and the Cameca NanoSIMS instrument since 2000. He led the Long Duration Exposure Facility. Zinner was instrumental in identifying, for the first time, material in meteorites that pre-dated the formation of the Solar System 4.6 billion years ago. Zinner and his colleagues found minute amounts of stardust - diamond and silicon carbide - that originated outside the solar system. Identification of these grains involved a measurement technique called secondary ion mass spectrometry (SIMS). Zinner and Ghislaine Crozaz expanded the use of SIMS to examine rare earth elements and applied this new technique to measure rare earth elements in thin sections of rocks and minerals.

== Awards and honours ==
- 1987 Antarctic Service Medal, National Science Foundation
- 1997 J. Lawrence Smith Medal, National Academy of Sciences
- 1997 Leonard Medal of the Meteoritical Society
- 2010 Merle A. Tuve Fellow of the Carnegie Institution of Washington
- 2011 Fellow of the American Association for the Advancement of Science

== Legacy ==
After his death, his family established an "Ernst Zinner Scholarship Fund" to support advanced cello students in the Community Music School at Webster University. Zinner had started learning cello at age 55, along with his son, then age 4.
