= Theresa Cameron =

American academic (1954–2012)

Theresa Ann Cameron (January 29, 1954, in Buffalo, New York – May 2012) was the first African-American woman to be awarded tenure in the College of Design at Arizona State University, in 2000.

== Background ==
After spending her entire childhood in foster care, Cameron put herself through college, with a full scholarship to Boston College and then a transfer to the State University of New York, Buffalo. She eventually obtained her Doctorate in Design from Harvard Graduate School of Design in 1991. Her difficult childhood experiences are chronicled in her book Foster Care Odyssey in America: A Black Girl's Story published in 2002, and detailed by Christel Hyden.

== Controversy ==
On September 7, 2008, ASU President Michael M. Crow fired Cameron, an Associate Professor with tenure, for "plagiarism of syllabi" and two other charges. The move to fire Cameron was opposed by the University Faculty Senate (Committee on Academic Freedom and Tenure), who were overruled by Crow.

Cameron filed suit on August 13, 2006, in the U.S. District Court in Phoenix seeking an injunction and other relief against the Arizona Board of Regents and Arizona State University, alleging violations of federal civil rights and employment laws that make it unlawful to discriminate on the basis of disability (the Americans with Disabilities Act), gender or race. Cameron sued ASU for discrimination, but lost the case against ASU on appeal in May, 2011.

== Health and death ==
Cameron suffered from heart problems, including a heart attack in February 2007, and depression. She died in 2012.
