= Nuclepore filter =

Bioprocessing filter

A nuclepore filter (brand name Nuclepore from Whatman, part of GE Healthcare) is a kind of filter in which holes a few micrometres in size have been created in a plastic (e.g. polycarbonate) membrane. These filters are generally created by exposing the membrane to radiation that weakens the plastic and creates specific areas that can be removed by dousing the membrane in acid (or other chemicals). The technique and patent were developed by Robert L. Fleischer, P. Buford Price, and Robert M. Walker as an outgrowth of their research on radiation effects in solids, with a special focus on materials exposed to energetic particles in space. The technique allows creating uniform holes of any desired diameter to allow even a virus to be filtered.

The most common use of Nuclepore filters is in microbiology, where they are used to trap cells while removing all other fluids and smaller particles, e.g. for counting bacteria by fluorescence microscopy. Because the filters have a flat surface, the cells are trapped on top of the filter and remain visible, unlike other types of filters, where the cells may be trapped inside the filter. This makes this type of filter particularly suitable in bioburden testing, as common pore sizes (i.e. 0.45 μm or 0.2 μm) effectively retain bacteria and fungi used in bioburden assays.

== See also ==
- Ion track
