= Christine Floss =

American cosmochemist

Christine Floss (1961–2018) was a German-born American cosmochemist whose research involved studying the atomic composition of meteorites, interplanetary dust, and moon rocks in order to understand the formation of the Solar System. She was a research professor of physics at Washington University in St. Louis, affiliated with the university's Laboratory for Space Sciences and McDonnell Center for the Space Sciences.

== Early life and education ==
Floss was born in Munich, but moved to the US with her family as a child of five. She majored in German at Purdue University, graduating in 1983, but cast around in many directions for a career, eventually finding her life interest in a geology class she took to fulfil a general education requirement. Floss earned a second bachelor's degree in geology from Indiana University Bloomington, in 1987, with a senior thesis on moon rocks advised by Abhijit Basu.

She completed a Ph.D. in geochemistry at Washington University in St. Louis in 1991, under the supervision of Ghislaine Crozaz. Her dissertation was Rare earth element and other trace element microdistributions in two unusual extraterrestrial igneous systems: The enstatite achondrite (aubrite) meteorites and the lunar ferroan anorthosites. She entered the doctoral program already married, with two children; the marriage ended during her graduate studies. Crozaz later wrote: "She was definitely one of our best students, and I wondered how she managed to complete her PhD in only four years while at the same time raising two young girls".

== Career and later life ==
She became a postdoctoral researcher at the Max Planck Institute for Nuclear Physics in Heidelberg, Germany, "mostly for personal reasons": following her future husband, Frank Stadermann, a German researcher in the same specialty whom she had met when he was a visiting student at Washington University. They married in 1993, and had another child before returning together to Washington University in 1996. Floss became a research scientist in the Laboratory for Space Sciences. Eventually she became a research professor.

Her husband died at age 48, in 2010, of a cerebral hemorrhage. She was found dead on April 19, 2018 of a heroin overdose. At the time of her death, she was in the process of becoming a regular-rank full professor at Washington University.

== Recognition ==
Asteroid 6689 Floss, discovered in 1981 by Schelte J. Bus, was named for Floss. A special issue of the journal Meteoritics & Planetary Science was published in her memory in 2020. A lunar crater was named after her in 2023.
