= P. Buford Price =

American physicist (1932–2021)

Paul Buford Price (1932 – 2021), usually known as P. Buford Price, was a professor in the graduate school at the University of California, Berkeley and a member of the National Academy of Sciences. His work had been wide-ranging over his career, but began with the study of physics and included cosmic rays, astrophysics, nuclear physics, glaciology, climatology, biology in extreme environments, and origins of life. He was born November 8, 1932, in Memphis, TN and died December 28, 2021.

== Biography ==
In the early part of his career, he codeveloped techniques to record the motions of energetic charged particles in solids, in particular plastics.

The technique involves the fact that ionizing particles that traverse materials such as Lexan plastic break chemical bonds, weakening the material along the path of the particle. By placing the material in a dissolving solution such as caustic sodium hydroxide, the damage can be dissolved away ["etched"], revealing the ionization damage. The greater the damage, the faster is the etching. The technique has been used in a number of applications. On the one hand, inspection of the tracks is a valuable tool in determining properties of charged particles as e.g. cosmic rays. On the other hand, the number of such tracks in natural glasses and minerals can be used for fission track dating of the substance.

A more practical application is the creation of nucleopore filters, widely used in microbiology. To create nucleopore filters, the technique is applied to a polycarbonate film and the etching is allowed to continue from both sides of a sheet of plastic until the two holes are connected, resulting in a tiny hole in the sheet. Continuous dissolving thereafter slowly and predictably widens the hole diameter until the desired diameter is obtained.

Use of the technique in an experiment carried by a high-altitude balloon in 1975 resulted in the detection of one highly anomalous cosmic ray particle that traversed a stack of 32 sheets of Lexan plastic. The particle was tentatively identified as a magnetic monopole in 1975 by Price and some colleagues. That conclusion was withdrawn in 1978 after further analysis led the Price group to conclude that the particle did not have the appropriate charge to be a monopole, though leaving open the possibility that a supermassive magnetic monopole might have caused the track. However, Luis W. Alvarez proposed that this track can be explained with a platinum atom decaying into osmium and later into tantalum.

Price was a founding member of the team that constructed the Antarctic Muon And Neutrino Detector Array (AMANDA) and was associated with the IceCube Neutrino Detector. During his work with AMANDA, he showed that micrometre-size bacteria and archaea can live in liquid veins throughout depths of several kilometers in glacial ice.

In 1971, he received the Ernest O. Lawrence Medal with Robert Walker and Robert Fleischer for work on understanding how to capture charged particle tracts in solids. He was elected to the National Academy of Sciences in 1975.
