= Charles Stanish =

American archaeologist

Charles Stanish (born 1956) is an American archaeologist specializing in the archaeology of the Andes, and in particular examines the origins of complex civilizations in the prehispanic Andes. He is a professor of Anthropology at the University of South Florida in Tampa.

Stanish grew up near Pittsburgh, Pennsylvania. After receiving his BA in Anthropology from Penn State University in 1979, he earned an MA (1983) and PhD (1985) from the University of Chicago.

== Career and awards ==
Stanish was a curator at the Field Museum of Natural History in the Department of Anthropology from 1988 to 1997, faculty at the University of California, Los Angeles beginning in 1997, and the director of UCLA's Cotsen Institute of Archaeology from 2001 to 2016. He is currently a professor of Anthropology and director of the Institute for the Advanced Study of Culture and the Environment at the University of South Florida.

In recognition of his scholarly work, Stanish was elected to the National Academy of Science in 2010. He is also a fellow of the American Academy of Arts and Sciences (2006), a fellow of the Explorers Club (2012), and a member of Sigma Xi (2018). Previously, he was a Dumbarton Oaks Senior Fellow (2008-2014).

== Research ==
Stanish's theoretical work examines on the roles of trade, war, and labor organization in the evolution of human cooperation and complex societies. In the Lake Titicaca basin, Stanish and colleagues identified a complex trade network linking the basin to the eastern Andean lowlands and Amazonia. Their research in Titicaca also provided evidence for the role of warfare in the process of state formation. In the Chincha Valley of Peru, Stanish and Henry Tantaleán identified geoglyphs associated with Paracas ritual centers; this finding was named one of 2019's greatest archaeological discoveries by the Peruvian Ministry of Culture. He has also conducted scientific investigations on the Band of Holes, a mysterious site on the Peruvian south coast which has often been the subject of pseudoscientific speculation.

== Philanthropy ==
Stanish, along with his wife Garine Babian, are major donors in support of anthropological education. They established the Charles Stanish Enhancement Fund at Penn State University, and the Charles Stanish Annual Award with the Society for American Archaeology.

== Books ==
- (Editor with Don S. Rice and Phillip R. Scarr) Ecology, Settlement, and History in the Osmore Drainage, Peru, B.A.R. (Oxford, England), 1989.
- Ancient Andean Political Economy, University of Texas Press (Austin, TX), 1992.
- (With Brian S. Bauer) Ritual and Pilgrimage in the Ancient Andes: The Islands of the Sun and the Moon, University of Texas Press (Austin, TX), 2001.
- Ancient Titicaca: The Evolution of Complex Society in Southern Peru and Northern Bolivia, University of California Press (Berkeley, CA), 2003.
- Lake Titicaca. Legend, Myth and Science. Cotsen Institute of Archaeology Press, Los Angeles. 2011.
- The Evolution of Human Cooperation: Ritual and Social Complexity in Stateless Societies. Cambridge University Press, Cambridge, 2017.
