= ARTIS International =

American scientific research organization

- Formation: 2006
- Founder: Scott Atran · Richard Davis · Marc Sageman
- Headquarters: Scottsdale, AZ
- Key people: Co-Founder and Director of Research Dr. Scott Atran, Co-Founder and Chief Executive Officer Dr. Richard Davis
- Affiliations: Center for the Resolution of Intractable Conflict, University of Oxford
- Staff: >10
- Website: artisinternational.org

ARTIS International is an organization that focuses on behavioral dynamics affecting conflict.

ARTIS International was founded in 2006 by Scott Atran, Richard Davis, and Marc Sageman.

== The Devoted Actor Model ==
ARTIS has trademarked The Devoted Actor Model as a way to model human behavior. The company published an article in the journal Nature Human Behaviour in August 2017 titled 'The Devoted Actor's Will to Fight and the Spiritual Dimension of Human Conflict'.
