= Ghislaine Crozaz =

Cosmochemist

- Education: Université libre de Bruxelles
- Scientific career
- Workplaces: Washington University in St. Louis
- Thesis: Mise au point d'une méthode de datation des glaciers basée sur la radioactivité du plomb-210 (1967)
- Doctoral advisor: Edgard Picciotto
- Doctoral students: Christine Floss; Meenakshi Wadhwa

Ghislaine Crozaz (born 1939) is a cosmochemist known for her research on the early history of the Solar System through tracking trace elements in meteorites.

== Education and career ==
Crozaz received a B.Sc. in 1961 and a Ph.D. in 1967 from the University of Brussels. In 1967, and from 1971 to 1972, she was a visiting associate in Geochemistry at California Institute of Technology. She moved to Washington University in St. Louis as a postdoctoral investigator in the lab of Robert M. Walker. As of 2021, she is professor emerita in Earth and Planetary Sciences in Arts and Sciences at Washington University in St. Louis and lives in Brussels.

The planet Ghislaine, discovered in 1986 by Carolyn Shoemaker and Eugene Shoemaker, is named after Crozaz.

== Research ==
While a Ph.D. student, Crozaz pioneered the use of lead-210 to establish ages in ice cores in Antarctica and Greenland. While working in Brussels, Crozaz became interested in space science and meteorites she started working on the first lunar samples returned to Earth during the Apollo 11 mission. She started her research in this arena by looking at fission tracks in lunar samples. These lunar samples are still serving as the basis for scientific research many years later. Crozaz went on to work with Ernest Zinner to develop an ion microprobe method to measure rare earth elements in the individual crystals found in extraterrestrial and terrestrial rocks. Crozaz later participated in group efforts to sample meteorites in Antarctica, one of which was the first lunar sample found on Earth, and through this research examined the history of meteorites found in Antarctica.

=== Selected publications ===
- Crozaz, G.; Picciotto, E.; De Breuck, W. (1964-06-15). "Antarctic snow chronology with Pb 210". Journal of Geophysical Research. 69 (12): 2597–2604. doi:10.1029/JZ069i012p02597. hdl:2013/ULB-DIPOT:oai:dipot.ulb.ac.be:2013/275564.
- Crozaz, G.; Haack, U.; Hair, M.; Hoyt, H.; Kardos, J.; Maurette, M.; Miyajima, M.; Seitz, M.; Sun, S.; Walker, R.; Wittels, M.; Woolum, D. (30 January 1970). "Solid State Studies of the Radiation History of Lunar Samples". Science. 167 (3918): 563–566. Bibcode:1970Sci...167..563C. doi:10.1126/science.167.3918.563. PMID 17781498. S2CID 45419754.
- Zinner, Ernst; Crozaz, Ghislaine (1986-02-17). "A method for the quantitative measurement of rare earth elements in the ion microprobe". International Journal of Mass Spectrometry and Ion Processes. 69 (1): 17–38. Bibcode:1986IJMSI..69...17Z. doi:10.1016/0168-1176(86)87039-2. ISSN 0168-1176.
- Crozaz, Ghislaine; Floss, Christine; Wadhwa, Meenakshi (2003-12-15). "Chemical alteration and REE mobilization in meteorites from hot and cold deserts". Geochimica et Cosmochimica Acta. 67 (24): 4727–4741. Bibcode:2003GeCoA..67.4727C. doi:10.1016/j.gca.2003.08.008. ISSN 0016-7037.

== Personal life ==
Crozaz was married to Robert Walker, with whom she shared an interest in lunar materials.

== Awards and honors ==
- Fellow, American Geophysical Union (2002)
- Fellow, Meteoritical Society (1984)
