= Meenakshi Wadhwa =

Planetary scientist

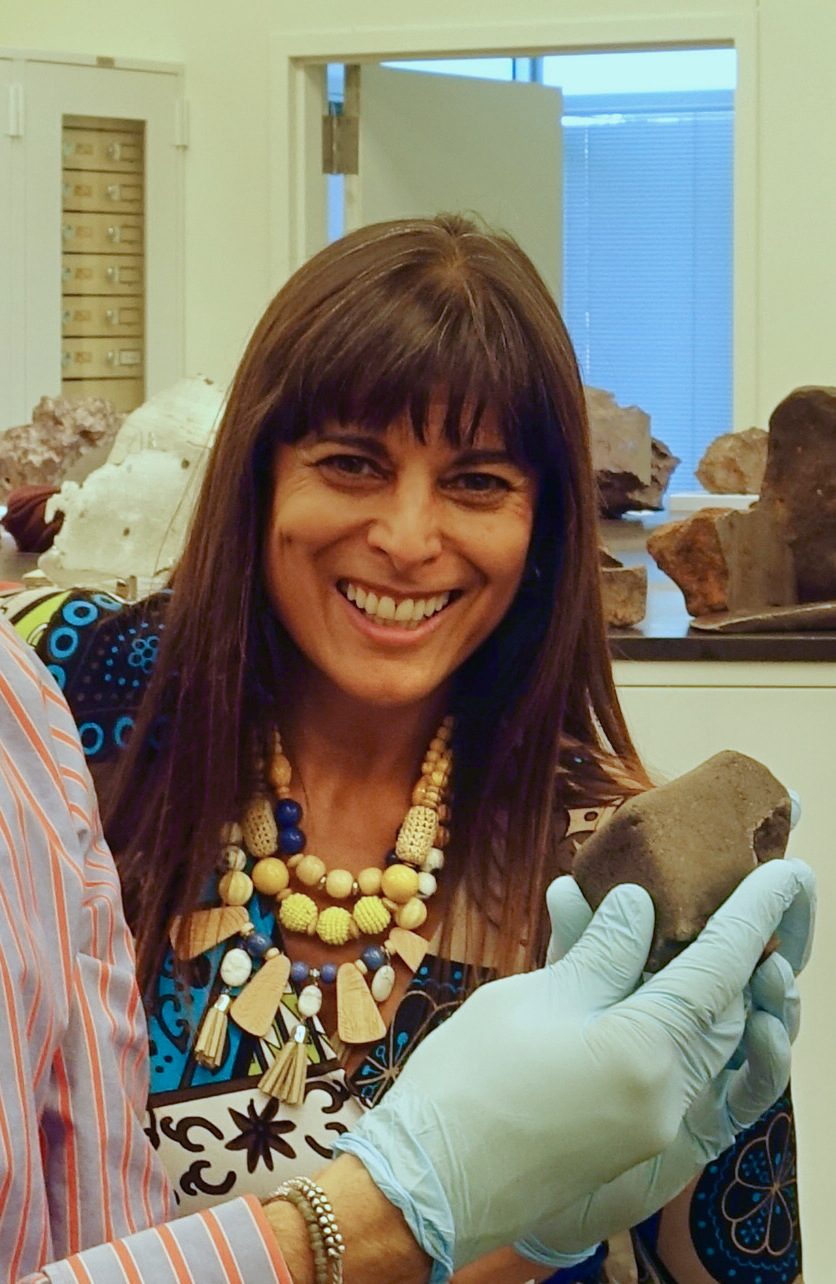
- Education: Washington University in St. Louis; Panjab University
- Scientific career
- Fields: Planetary science
- Workplaces: Arizona State University; The Field Museum; University of California, San Diego; Scripps Institution of Oceanography
- Thesis: Geochemical studies of two unusual groups of meteorites : trace elements in SNC meteorites and Mn-Cr systematics in unequilibrated enstatite chondrites (1994)
- Doctoral advisor: Ghislaine Crozaz
- Website: https://search.asu.edu/profile/957644

Meenakshi Wadhwa is a planetary scientist and educator who studies the formation and evolution of the Solar System through the analysis of planetary materials including meteorites, Moon rocks and other extraterrestrial samples returned by spacecraft missions. She was director of the School of Earth and Space Exploration at Arizona State University. She is the vice chancellor for Marine Sciences, dean of the School of Marine, Earth, and Atmospheric Sciences, and director of Scripps Institution of Oceanography at the University of California, San Diego.

== Career ==
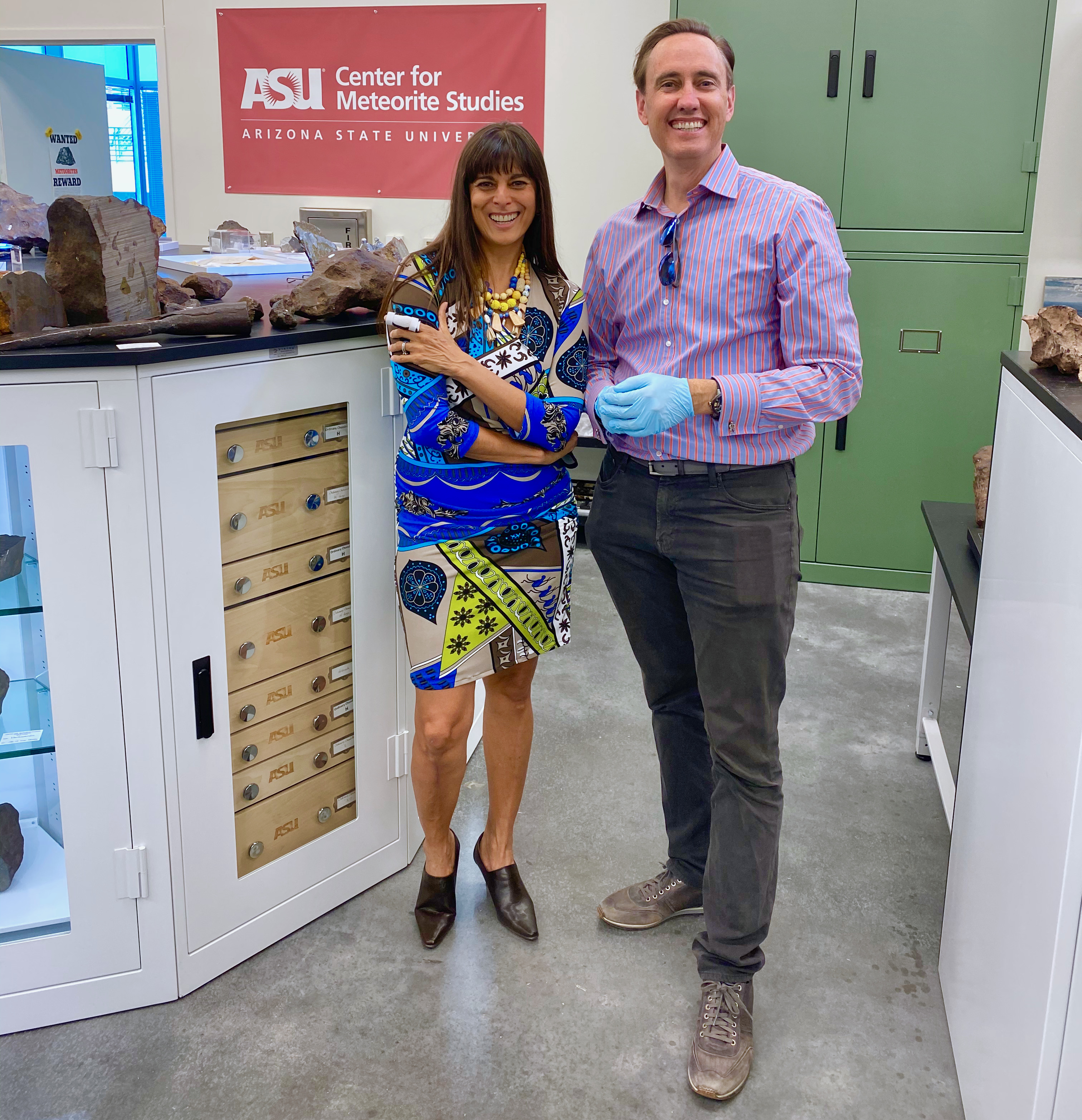
Meenakshi Wadhwa and Steve Jurvetson in an April 2021 photograph

Meenakshi Wadhwa received her Ph.D. in earth and planetary sciences in 1994 from Washington University in St. Louis. She was a postdoctoral research geochemist at the University of California, San Diego (1994–95), and then became curator of meteorites at Field Museum of Natural History (1995–2006). She served as director of the Center for Meteorite Studies at Arizona State University from 2006 till 2019, where she oversaw the curation of one of the largest university-based meteorite collections, and a variety of research and educational activities. She was appointed as director of ASU's School of Earth and Space Exploration as of 1 July, 2019 and left the position in October 2025 to work for the Scripps Institution of Oceanography. She has searched for meteorites in Antarctica with the Antarctic Search for Meteorites (ANSMET) Program during two field seasons (2002–03 and 2012–13). She has served as a science team member on a number of NASA planetary science missions including Genesis and Mars Science Laboratory. She was PI of a proposal for Sample Collection for the Investigation of Mars (SCIM) to the NASA Discovery program in 2010. She is a distinguished visiting scientist at the Jet Propulsion Laboratory and also serves as the principal scientist for the Mars Sample Return program. On 16 July 2025, her appointment to several roles at the University of California, San Diego, including director of Scripps Institution of Oceanography was announced, and she joined the university on 1 October 2025.

== Awards and honors ==
In 1999 she was awarded the asteroid name 8356 Wadhwa by the International Astronomical Union (IAU). She was awarded the Nier Prize in 2000, a Guggenheim Fellowship in 2005, and the J. Lawrence Smith Medal by the National Academy of Sciences in 2021. Wadhwa is an elected fellow of the Meteoritical Society (2006), the Explorers Club (2012), the American Geophysical Union (2019), and the Geochemical Society (2021). She was elected to membership in the National Academy of Sciences in 2023.
