= Marc Sageman =

American forensic psychiatrist and intelligence analyst

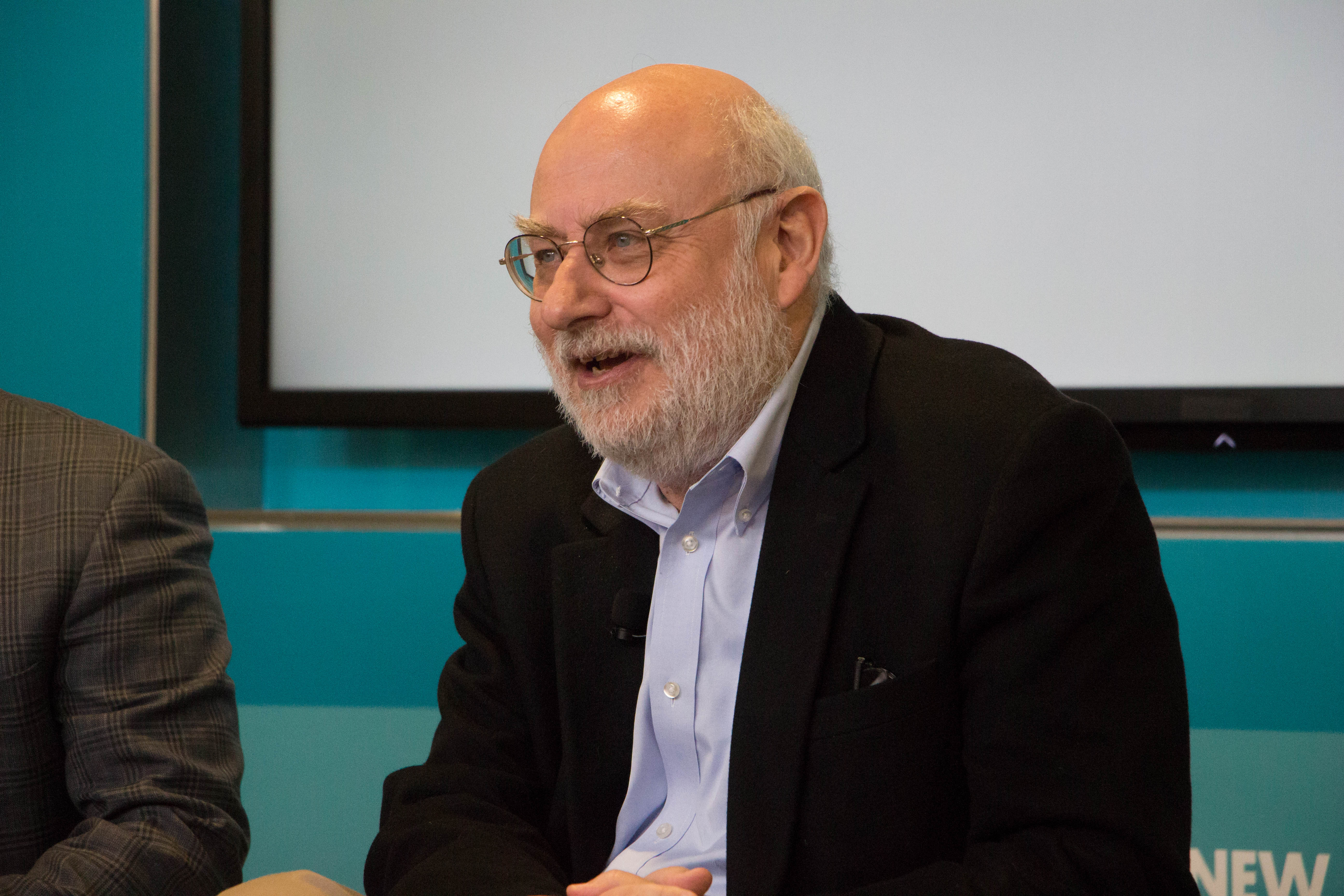
Sageman in 2017

Marc Sageman is an American psychiatrist and a US government consultant focus on terrorism and especially Al Qaida. He was a CIA Operations Officer from 1984 to 1991 (with tasks as a Foreign Service officer based in Islamabad). During that years, he worked closely with Afghanistan's mujahedin.

He is a forensic psychiatrist and a counter-terrorism consultant. He testified before the US 9/11 Commission, in Washington DC, July 9, 2003. Then, he has advised various branches of the U.S. government in the war on terror (the FBI, the National Security Council, the Secretary of Defense), and also private companies and lawyers, through his own firm Sageman Consulting LLC.

From 2006 to 2010, he worked on a four-year project on violent terrorism for the U.S. Air Force Research Laboratory. He presented the results of this research to the faculty of the FBI Academy in Quantico, VA in April 2010.

From 2010 to 2013, he was a Special Adviser to the Deputy Chief of Staff of the Army of the Intelligence, branch. During that, he published some of his findings in an unclassified report from the Office of Secretary of Defense.

He first drew wide attention for his book Understanding Terror Networks, a book that The Economist called "influential." "The most sophisticated analysis of global jihadis yet published. . . . His conclusions have demolished much of the conventional wisdom about who joins jihadi groups."

In Leaderless Jihad: Terror Networks in the Twenty-First Century, Sageman "suggests that radicalization is a collective rather than an individual process in which friendship and kinship are key components." After the book was negatively reviewed by Bruce Hoffman in Foreign Affairs, a debate, which was covered by The New York Times, ensued between him and Sageman. In this debate, Sageman argue that terrorism is now "bottom up" where terrorist act as lone wolf or radicalized person create terrorist structure.

In The London Bombings, Sageman investigates four bombing plots from an intelligence viewpoint: Operation Crevice (in relation to the fertiliser bomb plot), Operation Theseus (which investigated the July 7, 2005 attacks), Operation Vivace (which investigated the failed July 21, 2005 plot) and Operation Overt (in relation to the liquid bomb airline plot). Reviewed by Dr Anthony Richards, Royal Holloway College in 'Perspectives on Terrorism'

== Published works ==
- Understanding Terror Networks (Philadelphia: University of Pennsylvania Press, 2004)
- Leaderless Jihad: Terror Networks in the Twenty-First Century (Philadelphia: University of Pennsylvania Press, 2008)
- Misunderstanding Terrorism (Philadelphia: University of Pennsylvania Press, 2016)
- The London Bombings (Philadelphia: University of Pennsylvania Press, 2019)

== See also ==
- Operation Cyclone
