= Anne Stone (academic) =

American anthropological geneticist

Anne C. Stone
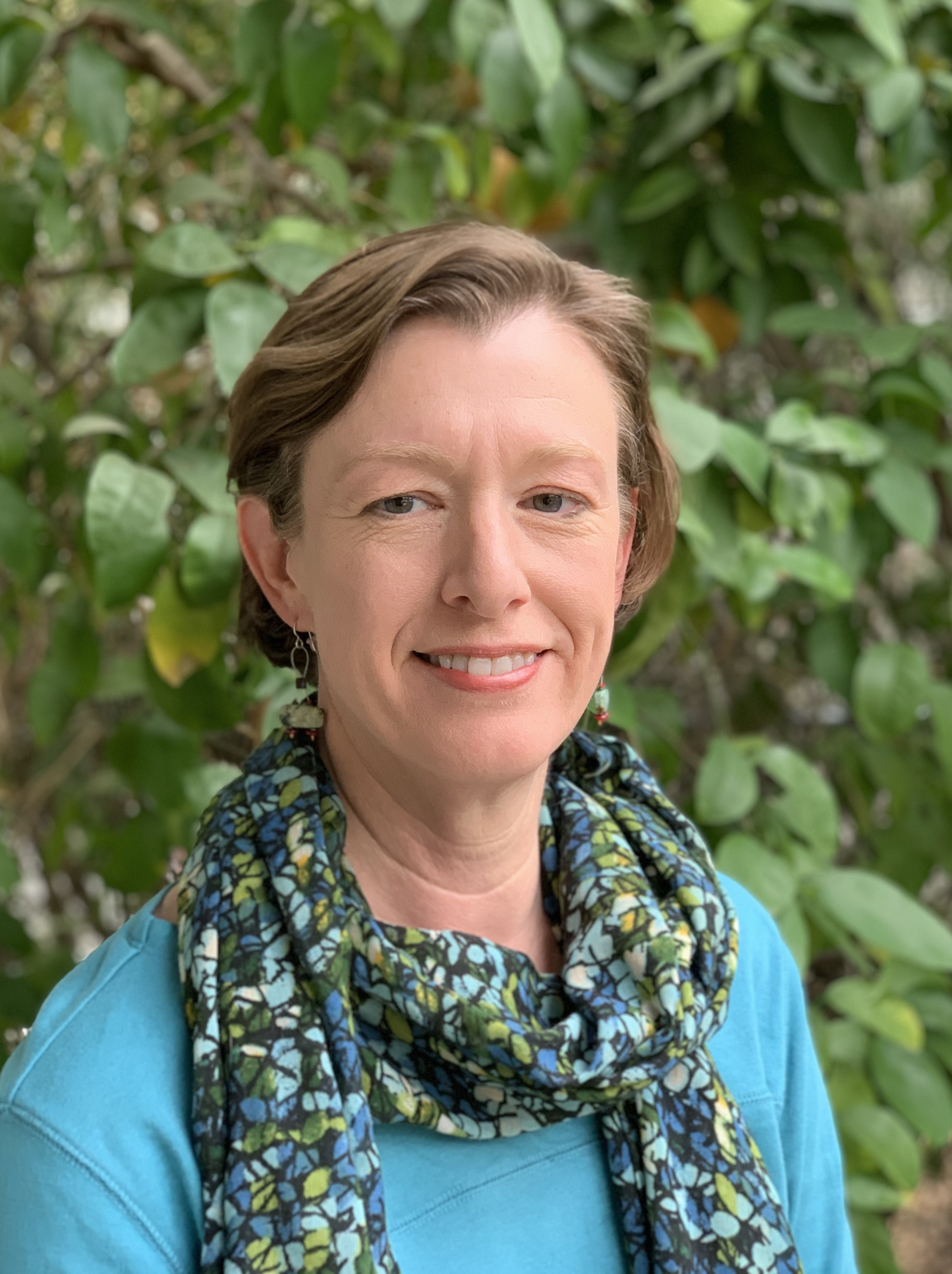
- Education: University of Virginia (BA); Pennsylvania State University (MA); Pennsylvania State University (PhD)
- Known for: Ancient DNA
- Awards: Member of the National Academy of Sciences (2016)
- Scientific career
- Workplaces: University of Arizona; University of New Mexico; Arizona State University
- Doctoral advisor: George R. Milner; Mark Stoneking
- Website: isearch.asu.edu/profile/627984

Anne C. Stone is an American anthropological geneticist and a Regents' Professor in the School of Human Evolution and Social Change at Arizona State University. Her research focuses on population history and understanding how humans and the great apes have adapted to their environments, including their disease and dietary environments. Stone is a Fellow of the American Association for the Advancement of Science and a Member of the National Academy of Sciences.

== Education ==
Stone completed her undergraduate degree in Biology and Archaeology at the University of Virginia. In 1989, she moved to Pennsylvania State University for her doctoral studies in Anthropology with George Milner and Mark Stoneking. Her doctoral research included the largest genetic analysis of a pre-historic Native American population, from the 700-year-old Norris Farms cemetery in Illinois. In 1992, she was awarded a Fulbright scholarship to spend a year at LMU Munich working with the famous paleogeneticist Svante Pääbo. During this time, she conducted ancient DNA analyses of Ötzi, the Tyrolean Ice Man. Stone graduated with her doctoral degree in 1996 and joined the University of Arizona as a National Institutes of Health NRSA postdoctoral scholar to work alongside Michael Hammer.

== Career and research ==
Stone joined the University of New Mexico as an assistant professor in 1999 and later moved to Arizona State University in 2003 as an associate professor. Stone became a full professor in 2010 and was selected as a Regents' Professor in 2017.

Stone is an expert in the field of ancient DNA research, especially on the population history of the Americas. Research in the Stone Lab focuses on three main themes: (a) Native American population history, (b) the evolutionary history of the Great Apes, and (c) understanding the co-evolutionary history of mycobacteria (specifically Mycobacterium tuberculosis and Mycobacterium leprae, the causative agents of tuberculosis and leprosy, respectively) with human and non-human primates.

Stone's work has contributed greatly to understanding of how infectious diseases such as tuberculosis have evolved over time. She has used ancient DNA to understand the evolutionary history of Mycobacterium tuberculosis, the pathogen which causes tuberculosis. In 2014, Stone co-led a study, along with paleogeneticist Johannes Krause, bioarchaeologist Jane Buikstra, and others, which found that prehistoric Native American people were infected by a strain of M. tuberculosis transmitted by pinnipeds, such as seals, sometime between 1,000 and 3,000 years ago. This surprising discovery was reported in the journal Nature, and indicated that prehistoric Native Americans were infected by an animal strain of M. tuberculosis that rarely infects people today and which was later replaced by strains brought over by Europeans after the Age of Discovery. Stone's work on tuberculosis allows us to understand the patterns of mutation responsible for allowing the bacterium to adapt to different hosts, which can provide insight into future drug design.

In 2016, Stone was part of a team that showed it was possible to reconstruct complete human mitochondrial genomes from ancient human dental calculus. This finding opened up the possibility of using dental calculus as a source for studying ancient biomolecules from the host. In 2018, Stone led a study describing how strains of Mycobacterium leprae, the pathogen that causes leprosy, can be passed from humans to nonhuman primates and vice versa.

Additionally, Stone has worked on the L-gulonolactone oxidase gene, which is associated with the production of Vitamin C in primates. At some stage in the evolution of primates, L-gulonolactone oxidase became inactive, and Stone's research has tried to understand how and why this happened. Stone has also developed new techniques that allow her to extract DNA from degraded or burnt bones, which could allow the identification of victims of forest fires.

Stone is a Senior Editor for the journal Molecular Biology and Evolution. She joined the Executive Committee of the American Association of Physical Anthropologists in 2016. Stone currently serves as the president for the American Association of Biological Anthropologists.

== Awards and honors ==
- 2007: Kavli Foundation Scholar
- 2010: Arizona State University Faculty Exemplar Award
- 2011: Fellow of the American Association for the Advancement of Science
- 2013: President of the American Association of Anthropological Genetics
- 2016: Elected as a Member of the National Academy of Sciences (NAS)
- 2018: Outstanding Alumni Award, Department of Anthropology, Pennsylvania State University
- 2022: Guggenheim Fellowship
