= Ramón Arrowsmith =

American geoscientist and academic

- Education: Stanford University
- Scientific career
- Fields: structural geology, tectonics, geomorphology
- Workplaces: Arizona State University

Ramón Arrowsmith is an American geologist, a geoscientist and professor at Arizona State University specializing in active faulting, earthquake geology, and tectonic geomorphology. He is the interim Director of ASU's School of Earth and Space Exploration and a co-founder of OpenTopography, a platform that provides free high-resolution topographic data for Earth science research.

== Academic career ==
Dr. Arrowsmith earned a Bachelor of Science in Geology and Spanish from Whittier College in 1989 and a Ph.D. in Geological and Environmental Sciences from Stanford University in 1995. His dissertation title was 'Coupled Tectonic Deformation and Geomorphic Degradation along the San Andreas Fault System'. Since 1995, Dr. Arrowsmith has been a professor at Arizona State University. Prof. Arrowsmith has served in numerous leadership roles in ASU's School of Earth and Space Exploration (SESE), including Associate Director of Graduate Studies, Associate Director for Operations, Deputy Director, and Interim Director. Arrowsmith was elected a fellow of the Geological Society of America in 2009 and served on the leadership of its Structural Geology and Tectonics division in 2022.

== Awards ==
In 2009, Arrowsmith was elected a fellow of the Geological Society of America. In 2007 and 2013, he was named the Arizona State University School of Earth and Space Exploration Undergraduate Professor of the Year. In 2020, Arrowsmith was the recipient of the American Geophysical Union's Paul G. Silver Award for Outstanding Scientific Service for his significant contributions to the fields of seismology, geomorphology, and fault zone activity. In 2022, he was recognized for the Faculty Service Achievement Award, Arizona State University Founders' Day. In 2023, he received the Open Science Recognition Prize (for OpenTopography along with 3 other PIs) from the American Geophysical Union. In 2025, he was honored with the President's Medal (for OpenTopography along with 3 other PIs) by the Geological Society of America.

== Research ==
Ramon Arrowsmith's research focuses on understanding the mechanics and history of fault zones through geology, paleoseismology, and tectonic geomorphology. By combining field studies, geophysical methods, and high-resolution topographic analysis, his work provides critical insights into seismic hazards and the evolution of Earth's landscapes.

Arrowsmith's interdisciplinary approach has applications beyond Earth sciences, influencing fields including climate change research, urban planning, and disaster mitigation. Arrowsmith has made contributions towards understanding the ties between climate controlled surface processes and rapid exhumation in the Southern Himalayan Front, providing insight into the internal tectonic deformation of the Himalayas. He has also utilized LiDAR-based digital elevation models to refine estimates for the magnitude and recurrence of slip events that cause earthquakes in the San Andreas Fault system (SAF). His work in the SAF system has assisted in revealing major earthquakes in the region including the 7.9 magnitude Fort Tejon earthquake in 1857 occurred from minor slips of roughly 5 meters, contrasting with previous estimates of high slips of 10 meters or more

Arrowsmith's work with technology capturing High Resolution Topography (HRT) has provided insight into the potential uses of the technology. He is also the co-founder of OpenTopography, which provides HRT data for research. OpenTopography centralizes access to topographic data, tools and resources which are used to further our understanding of Earth's surface, vegetation and the surrounding environment.

Arrowsmith and colleagues have also worked in East Africa, in particular the Afar of Ethiopia to understand the magmatic, tectonic, and sedimentary record of rifting with major applications to the context for human origins.
