= Issues in Science and Technology =

American policy journal

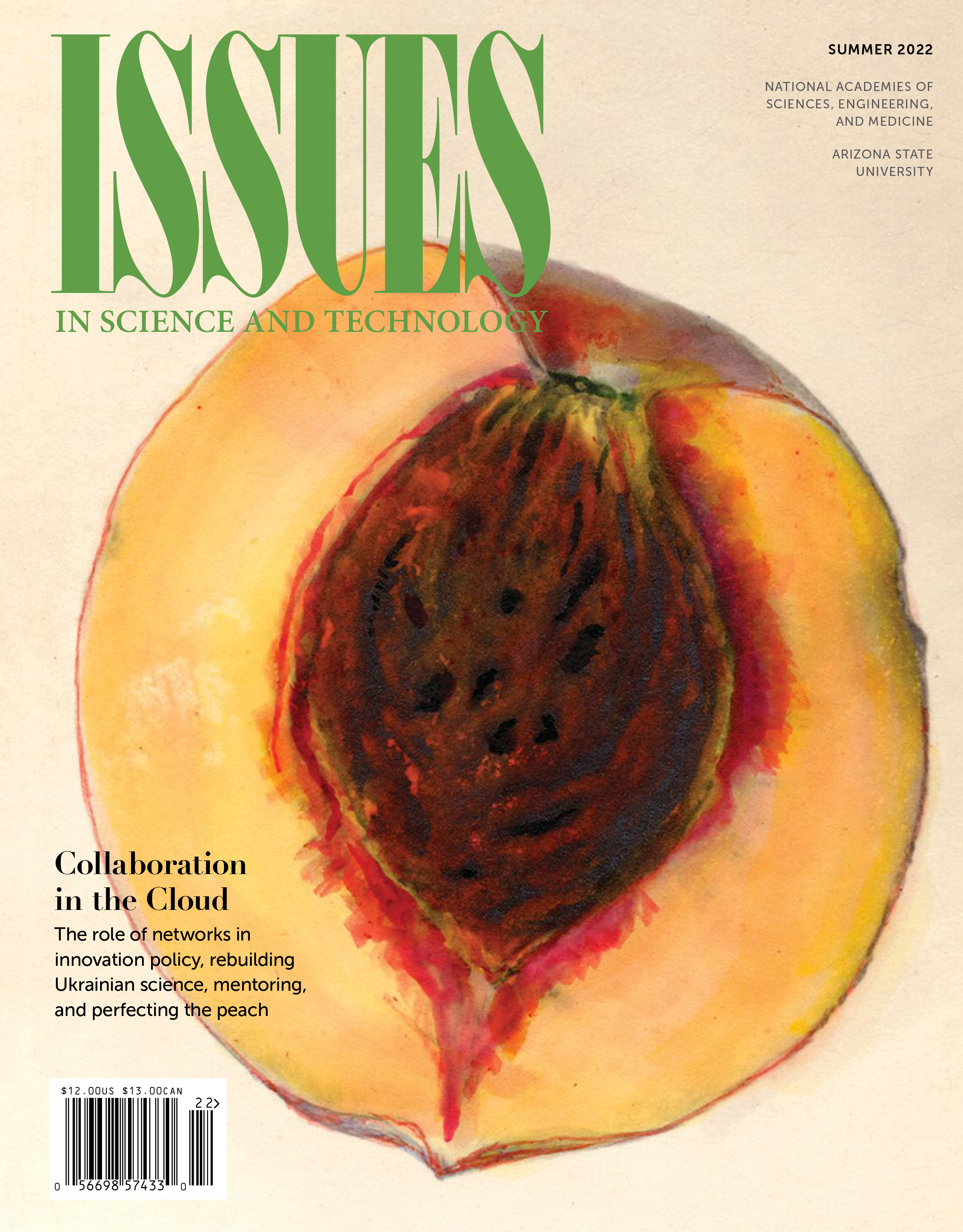
- Issues in Science and Technology
- Discipline: Public policy
- Language: English
- Edited by: Lisa Margonelli

Publication details
- History: 1984–present
- Publisher: United States National Academies of Sciences, Engineering, and Medicine and Arizona State University (United States)
- Frequency: Quarterly

Standard abbreviations
- ISO 4: Issues Sci. Technol.

Indexing
- ISSN: 0748-5492

Links
- Journal homepage

Issues in Science and Technology is a policy journal published by the United States National Academies of Sciences, Engineering, and Medicine and Arizona State University. The journal is a forum for discussion of public policy related to science, technology, engineering, and medicine. This includes policy for science (how to nurture the health of the research enterprise) and science for policy (how to use knowledge more effectively to achieve social goals), with emphasis on the latter.

According to the journal's mission statement: "Unlike a popular magazine, in which journalists report on the work of experts, or a professional journal, in which experts communicate with colleagues, Issues is a place where researchers, government officials, business leaders, and others with a stake in public policy can share ideas with a broad audience. When it comes to the relationship between society and advances in science and technology, the perspectives of the boardroom, the statehouse, the federal agency, and the community are as important as that of the laboratory."

The journal analyzes current topics in science, technology, and medicine, and seeks to provide recommendations by luminaries in government, industry, and academia to solve them. In the book review section, authors assess recent books about science and technology.

The journal also produces a podcast, The Ongoing Transformation, which features discussions with policymakers, academics, and other expert contributors.
