= New American University model =

University model

The New American University model is a concept proposed in 2014 by Michael M. Crow, the 16th president of Arizona State University (ASU). It primarily emphasizes expanding admitted class sizes and adapting teaching methods accordingly at universities.

The concept was first adopted by Arizona State University after being implemented in 2014 by the ASU Charter, and was introduced in Crow's 2015 book "Designing the New American University", in which the model was supported by former president Bill Clinton and former Florida governor Jeb Bush. The move is widely credited with boosting ASU's acceptance rate and increasing class size, making it become one of the largest public universities in the United States by enrollment. Inside Higher Ed criticized that the initiative increases the commercialization and corporatization of education, claiming that "Arizona State is indistinguishable from Amazon."

== Concept summary ==
The principles of the New American University model have been used to develop the ASU charter. The charter states: "ASU is a comprehensive public research university, measured not by whom it excludes, but by whom it includes and how they succeed; advancing research and discovery of public value; and assuming fundamental responsibility for the economic, social, cultural and overall health of the communities it serves." In his own words, Michael Crow summarizes the New American University model he proposed as:

1. "An academic platform committed to discovery and knowledge production, as with the standard model, linking pedagogy with research"
2. "Broad accessibility to students from highly diverse demographic and socioeconomic backgrounds"
3. "Through its breadth of activities and functions, an institutional commitment to maximizing societal impact commensurate with the scale of enrollment demand and the needs of our nation."

== Criticism ==
The model, though, has been criticized for decreasing the value of education, moving many in-person classes to online, and decreasing the value of academic positions such as tenure, as tenured professors are often less favored than adjunct and part-time instructors. Inside Higher Ed also criticized that the initiative increases the commercialization and corporatization of education, claiming that "Arizona State is indistinguishable from Amazon."

== External link ==
- NewAmericanUniversity.asu.edu
