= George Milner (footballer) =

Australian rules footballer

Personal information
- Full name: George Edward Milner
- Born: 17 March 1938
- Died: 6 August 2005 (aged 67)
- Original team: Ormond
- Height: 174 cm (5 ft 9 in)
- Weight: 65 kg (143 lb)

Playing career^{1}
Years	Club	Games (Goals)
1960–61	Melbourne	15 (1)
- ^{1} Playing statistics correct to the end of 1961.

George Edward Milner (17 March 1938 – 6 August 2005) was an Australian rules footballer who played with Melbourne in the Victorian Football League (VFL).
