= Victoria Reyes-García =

Spanish scientist

- Born: 2 July 1971 (age 55); Barcelona
- Education: Autonomous University of Barcelona; International University of Andalucía; University of Florida
- Scientific career
- Workplaces: Catalan Institution for Research and Advanced Studies; Heller School for Social Policy and Management
- Thesis: Indigenous people, ethnobotanical knowledge, and market economy : a case study of the Tsimane' Amerindians in lowland Bolivia (2001)

Victoria Reyes-García (born 2 July 1971) is a Spanish scientist who is a professor at the Catalan Institution for Research and Advanced Studies (ICREA). She studies ecological knowledge systems and their contributions on development.

== Early life and education ==
Reyes-García was born in Barcelona. She started her academic career at the Autonomous University of Barcelona, where she studied history. She moved to Ecuador to complete a graduate degree in Amazonian Studies. In 1995, Reyes-García returned to Spain, where she completed a Master's degree in the International University of Andalucía. She was a doctoral researcher in the United States, working on anthropology at the University of Florida. She was awarded a postdoctoral fellowship from the Wenner-Gren Foundation.

== Research and career ==
In 2002, Reyes-García was appointed to the faculty at the Heller School for Social Policy and Management. Between 1999 and 2004, Reyes-García lived among Tsimané hunter-gatherers in the Amazon rainforest. In 2006 she was made Head of the Laboratory for the Analysis of Socio-Ecological Systems in a Global World. Reyes-García moved to the Catalan Institution for Research and Advanced Studies (ICREA) as a Research Professor in 2008.

Reyes-García's research looks to better understand how climate change impacts physical, biological and social systems, as well as trying to establish how these impacts are perceived locally. In particular, she looks to learn from communities with long histories of interactions with their local environment, and involve their insight in the creation of new policies. For instance, she combines information about the physical impacts of climate change (sea level rise, glacier shrinking), with phenological studies and investigations into public perception of the physical impacts.

== Awards and honors ==
- 2009 Autonomous University of Barcelona Excellency in Research
- 2010 European Research Council Starting Grant
- 2017 European Research Council Consolidator Grant
- 2021 Elected Member of the National Academy of Sciences
- 2025 Awarded the Rei Jaume Prize in the Environmental Protection category
- 2026 Elected member of the Academia Europaea

== Selected publications ==
- L. Porter-Bolland; E. A. Ellis; M. R. Guariguata; I. Ruiz-Mallén; S. Negrete-Yankelevich; V. Reyes-García (2012). "Community managed forests and forest protected areas: An assessment of their conservation effectiveness across the tropics". Forest Ecology and Management. 268: 6–17. doi:10.1016/j.foreco.2011.05.034. Wikidata Q60047283.
- Ricardo Godoy; Reyes, Victoria E.; Elizabeth Byron; Leonard, William; Vincent Vadez (2005). "The Effect of Market Economies on the Well-Being of Indigenous Peoples and on their use of Renewable Natural Resources". Annual Review of Anthropology. 34 (1): 121–138. doi:10.1146/annurev.anthro.34.081804.120412. Wikidata Q60333266.
- Laura Calvet-Mir; Erik Gómez-Baggethun; Reyes, Victoria E. (2012). "Beyond food production: Ecosystem services provided by home gardens. A case study in Vall Fosca, Catalan Pyrenees, Northeastern Spain". Ecological Economics. 74: 153–160. doi:10.1016/j.ecolecon.2011.12.011. Wikidata Q60047281.

=== Books ===
- Hunter-gatherers in a changing world. Aili Pyhälä, Victoria Reyes-García. Cham, Switzerland. 2017. ISBN 978-3-319-42271-8. OCLC 966386335.
