= Band of Holes =

Archaeological site in Peru

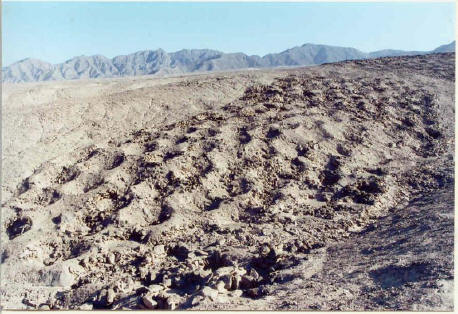
Oblique view of a small portion of the structure

The Band of Holes, also known in Spanish as Monte Sierpe (serpent mountain) or Cerro Viruela (smallpox hill), is a structure consisting of approximately 5,200 human-sized and stone-lined pits found in the Pisco Valley on the Nazca Plateau in Peru. Modern residents near the site have no knowledge of who made the pits nor how they were used. For many years, it has been speculated that they might be graves, defensive positions, or storage places. In 2015, researchers determined that the structure was built during the time of the Inca Empire (1438–1533), speculating that, because of a relationship to the Inca khipus device long-believed to be related to accounting, perhaps the structure was used to sort quantities of produce into standardized measurements using various pits that measure from 3.3 to 6.6 feet wide and 1.6 to 3.3 feet deep, and that the structure might be related to regional produce trade or to accounting for taxation using produce. In 2025, new scientific analysis suggested further support for that concept and encouraged more detailed research.

== Description ==
The structure lies between 13°42′59.9″S 75°52′28.46″W and 13°42′20″S 75°52′28.46″W. It basically extends in a north-south orientation over uneven terrain. The path of the structure ascends from the edge of a valley to the top of a hill, extending approximately 1.5 km. The stone-lined pits have raised edges and they are approximately 1 meter in diameter and 50–100 cm deep. The pits are arranged in varying blocks of distinct segments along a path that varies in width from 14 to 22 meters, with an average width of approximately 19 meters.

== Archaeological investigations ==
Modern attention was drawn to the site in 1933, when the aviator Robert Shippee published an aerial photograph in National Geographic.

Victor Wolfgang von Hagen surveyed the area in 1953. In The Royal Road of the Inca he describes these as pre-Inca graves, writing that:

These circular, stone-lined although unused graves lay in rows, seven to nine, and marched up the 50° angle to the slope called Mt. Sierpe, that is the “snaking” line of graves reminding the one who named it of a serpent. There are over 5,000 such graves; empty, graves in so far as they are circular and stone-lined, and of the same construction of those graves which are found with mummies, weavings and pottery. For years, ever since 1931 they appeared on the photographic plates of the aerial surveys of the Shippee–Johnson expedition, they were the "strange and mysterious pockmarks”, but when discovered and surveyed by the von Hagen expedition in 1953 and found to be unused graves, the mystery was compounded. The Inca engineers would have seen the same phenomena but as in the case of the equally mysterious Nasca lines, they filled in those which interfered with the road and ran it over and through them.

Other expeditions to the site were made in the early 1970s by archaeologists Dwight Wallace and Frederic Engel.

Archaeologist John Hyslop noted a relationship to other Inca structures in his 1984 book The Inka Road System that "Circular structures, sometimes semisubterranean, that may have been used for storage are also found on the Peruvian south coast in the sites Quebrada de la Vaca (Andes 1960:252, 253) and at Tambo Colorado. Hundreds of stone-lined circular holes in rows have been found on a low ridge on the north side of the Pisco Valley (Shippee 1933:93; Wallace 1971:105–106). Although their role has not been determined, a hypothesis for investigation is that they were used for storage. They are between two important Inka sites (Tambo Colorado and Lima la Vieja), and very near the point where the Inka coastal road crosses the road to the highlands. They might be one of the empire's larger storage sites."

In 2015, archaeologists from UCLA made a brief visit to the site and used photography from drone aircraft to create a detailed map of the structure. They speculated that the pits could have been used to measure produce given to the Inca state as tribute; the measurements might have been recorded on Incan khipus and reported to government officials. The archaeologists hoped to do further studies to detect pollen or phytoliths that might confirm this hypothesis.

In 2025, researchers published an article theorizing that, based on existing evidence, Monte Sierpe originally "functioned as a barter marketplace and was later used as an accounting device for tribute collection". Additional research is planned to test for evidence to support this theory.
