= Michael M. Crow =

American university president (born 1955)

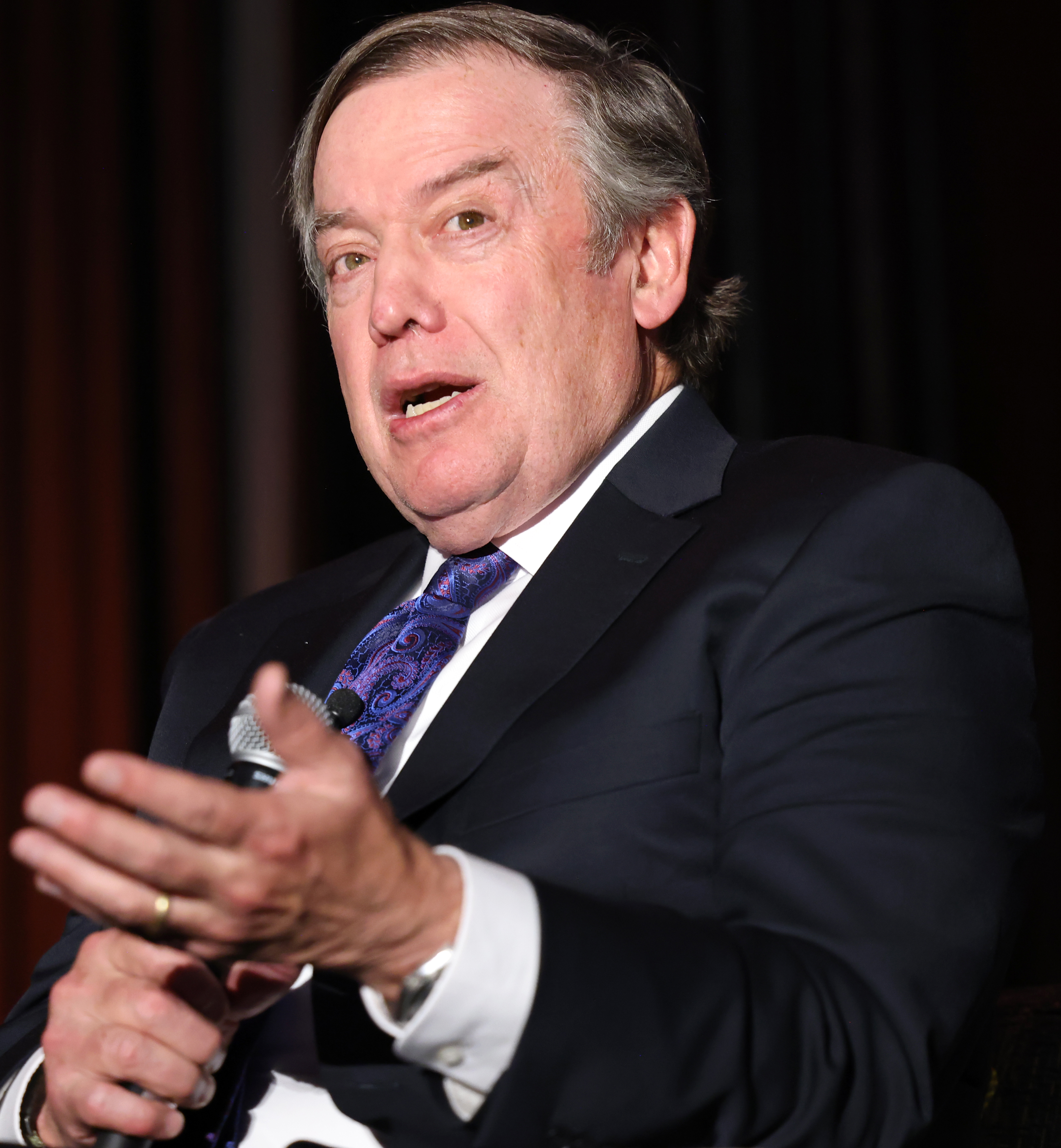
- Crow in 2025

16th President of Arizona State University
- Incumbent
- Assumed office July 1, 2002
- Preceded by: Lattie F. Coor

Personal details
- Born: October 11, 1955 (age 71) San Diego, California, U.S.
- Education: Iowa State University (BA); Southern Illinois University Carbondale (MPA); Syracuse University (PhD)

Academic background
- Thesis: The Effect of Publicness on Organizational Performance: A Comparative Study of R&D Laboratories (Theory, Science Policy, Effectiveness, Research, Development) (1985)

Academic work
- Discipline: Public administration
- Institutions: University of Kentucky; Iowa State University; Columbia University; Arizona State University

Michael Maurice Crow (born October 11, 1955) is an American academic administrator who has been serving as the 16th president of Arizona State University (ASU) since July 2002. He proposed the New American University model at ASU. He served as executive vice provost at Columbia University from 1998 to 2002.

He is also chairman of the board for In-Q-Tel, the Central Intelligence Agency's venture capital firm. In 2024 he was elected to the American Philosophical Society.

== Early life and education ==
Crow was born in San Diego, California, on October 11, 1955, the eldest of four siblings. His mother died when he was 9 leaving his widowed father, a sailor in the United States Navy, to raise the children on his own. As is common with military families, they moved many times during Crow's childhood. Crow was a Boy Scout who earned the rank of Eagle Scout in 1969. By the time he had graduated from Warren Township High School, he had attended 17 different schools.

Crow attended Iowa State University on an ROTC scholarship, graduating in 1977 with a Bachelor of Arts with majors in political science and environmental studies. Following his graduation, he worked for five years at research centers in Iowa and Illinois focusing on energy and policy research, while earning a Master of Public Administration from Southern Illinois University Carbondale. Crow received his doctoral degree in public administration with a focus on science and technology policy from Syracuse University in 1985.

== Career ==
After earning his doctorate, Crow worked as an advisor to the Office of Technology Assessment in the United States Congress and was a Research Fellow on the Technology and Information Policy Program at the Maxwell School of Citizenship and Public Affairs. He concurrently began his teaching career, first at the University of Kentucky and then at Iowa State University. He joined the Iowa State faculty in 1988 as an Associate Professor and Director of its Institute for Physical Research and Technology. By 1991, he had become an Institute Professor there and had also worked as a consultant for the United States Department of Energy and Columbia University.

Crow left Iowa State in 1991 to serve as Professor of Science and Technology Policy at the Columbia University School of International and Public Affairs. He served as executive vice provost at Columbia University from 1998 to 2002.

In 2002, Crow was appointed the 16th president of Arizona State University. In 2006, he was made a Fellow of the National Academy of Public Administration and in 2008 received an honorary doctorate from his alma mater, Iowa State University. Crow celebrated the 20th anniversary of his presidency in 2022, at which time the Arizona Board of Regents named him the inaugural Regents Distinguished President of Arizona State University. As president of ASU, Michael Crow proposed the New American University model for ASU.

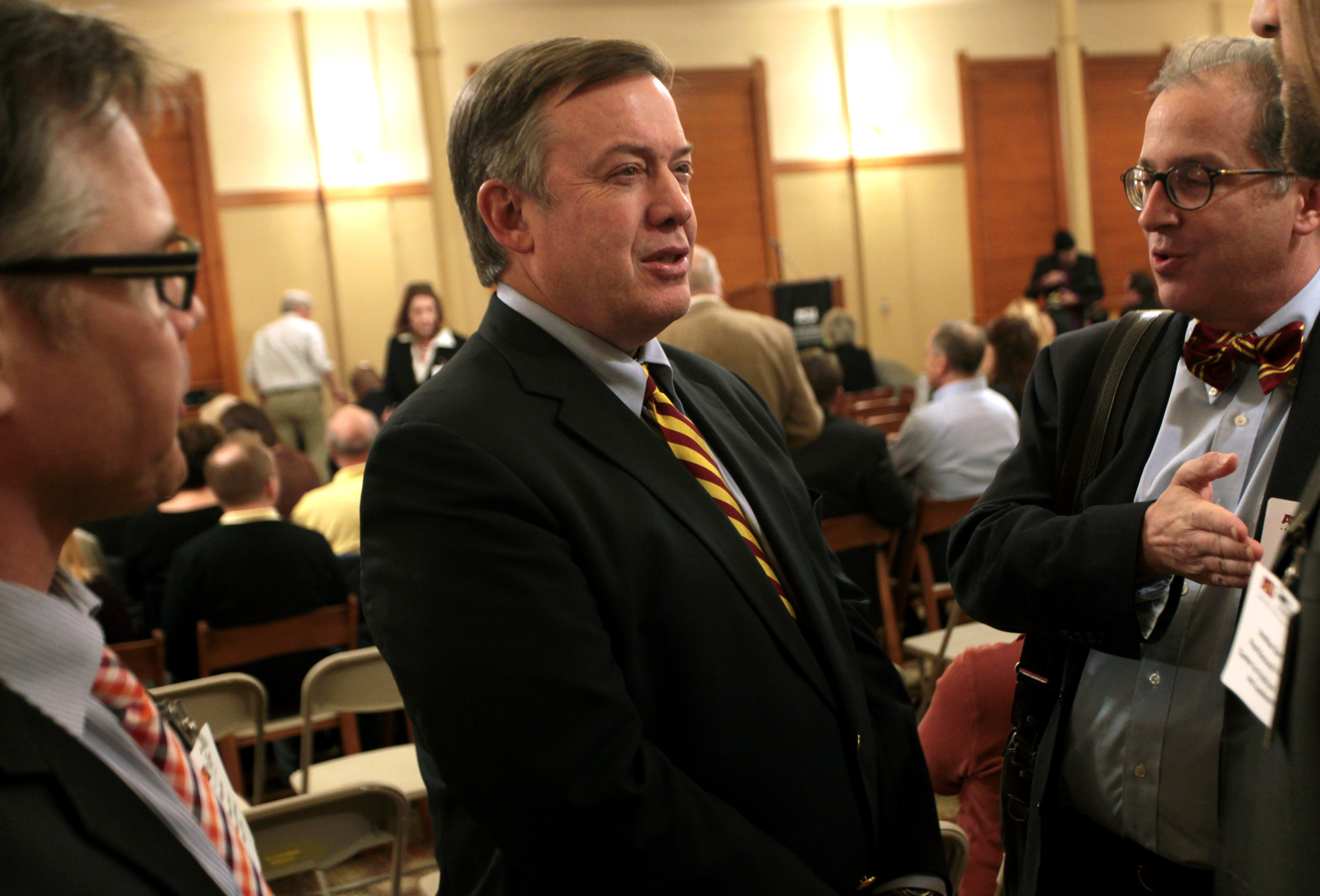
Michael M. Crow at Old Main at Arizona State University in Tempe.

== Personal life ==
Crow is married to Sybil Francis, who holds a Ph.D. in political science and government from the Massachusetts Institute of Technology and is CEO of the Center for the Future of Arizona, which she co-founded with Lattie Coor in 2002. The couple has one daughter and resides in Paradise Valley, Arizona. Crow has a son and daughter from a previous marriage.

== Selected publications ==
=== Books ===
- Artifacts of Abundance: (with Nicole K. Mayberry and Derrick M. Anderson), (Forthcoming 2026)
- Universities in Service to the Nation: Democratizing American Higher Education (with Derrick M. Anderson and William B. Dabars) (Forthcoming 2025)
- Public Values Leadership: Striving to Achieve Democratic Ideals (with Barry Bozeman) (2021) ISBN 978-1421442013
- The Fifth Wave: The Evolution of American Higher Education (with William B. Dabars) (2020) ISBN 978-1421438023
- Designing the New American University (with William Dabars) (2015) ISBN 978-1-4214-1723-3
- Limited by Design: R&D Laboratories in the United States (with Barry Bozeman) (1998) ISBN 0-231-10982-2
- Synthetic Fuels Technology Development in the United States: A Retrospective Assessment (with Barry Bozeman, Walter Meyers, and Ralph Shangraw) (1988) ISBN 0-275-93083-1

=== Articles ===
- "Academic Culture: Perspective from the Twenty-Second Century" (with William B. Dabars), Daedalus (Forthcoming 2025)
- "What a Coin from 1792 Reveals About America's Scientific Enterprise" (with Derrick M. Anderson and Nicole K. Mayberry), Issues in Science and Technology (Fall 2023).
- "The Affirmative Action Ban is Not an Insurmountable Setback for Higher Education Access", Times Higher Education (August 3, 2023).
- "Toward a Platform for Universal Learning", Not Alone Elsevier (June 22, 2022).
- "The Way We Classify College is All Wrong" (with Jeffrey J. Selingo), The Chronicle of Higher Education (October 13, 2021).
- "Improving Intellectual Infrastructure in American Higher Education" (with William H. Dabars), The Hill (July 31, 2021).
- "The Next 75 Years of US Science and Innovation Policy: An Introduction" (with Robert Conn, Cynthia Friend, and Marcia McNutt), Issues in Science and Technology (July 12, 2021).
- "The Emergence of the Fifth Wave in American Higher Education" (with William B. Dabars), Issues in Science and Technology 36, no. 3 (Spring 2020): 71–74.
- "The Arizona State University Interplanetary Initiative: Envisioning and Creating our Human Space Future" (with Lindy Elkins-Tanton and Evgenya L. Shkolnik), New Space 8, no. 3 (2020): 1–4.
- "Science Institutions for a Complex, Fast-Paced World" (with Marcia McNutt), Issues in Science and Technology 36, no. 2 (Winter 2020): 30–34.
- "Higher Logic" (with Derrick Anderson), Trusteeship (Association of Governing Boards of Colleges and Universities) 26, no. 3 (Summer 2018): 26–31.
- "Design Thinking in Higher Education: Towards Adaptive Enterprise" (with Clark Gilbert and Derrick Anderson), Stanford Social Innovation Review 16, no.1 (2017): 36–41.
- "Revisiting ‘Public Administration as a Design Science’ for the Twenty-First Century Public University" (with R.F. Shangraw), Public Administration Review 76, no. 5 (September/October 2016): 762–763.
- "Public Administration and the Imperative for Social Progress". Public Administration Review 76, no. 2 (March/April 2016): 215–216.
- "A New Model for the American Research University." Issues in Science and Technology (Spring 2015): 55–62.
- "Innovating Together: Collaboration as a Driving Force to Improve Student Success" (with Bridget Burns and Mark Becker). EDUCAUSE (March/April 2015): 10–20.
- "Look, Then Leap." Nature 499 (July 18, 2013): 275–277.
- "Citizen Science U." Scientific American (October 2012): 48–49.
- "Time to Rethink the NIH." Nature (journal)|Nature 471 (March 31, 2011): 569–571.
- "Differentiating America’s Colleges and Universities: Institutional Innovation in Arizona." Change: The Magazine of Higher Learning (September/October 2010): 34–39.
- "Organizing Teaching and Research to Address the Grand Challenges of Sustainable Development". BioScience (American Institute of Biological Sciences) 60, no. 7 (July/August 2010): 488–489.
- "Toward Institutional Innovation in America’s Colleges and Universities." Trusteeship (Association of Governing Boards of Colleges and Universities) 18, no. 3 (May/June 2010): 8–13.
- "Une nouvelle université américaine?" (with Catherine Paradeise), Le Débat: Histoire, Politique, Société 156 (September–October 2009): 117–127.
- "The Challenge for the Obama Administration Science Team." Issues in Science and Technology 25, no. 3 (2009): 29–30.
- "Overcoming Stone Age Logic." Issues in Science and Technology 24, no. 2 (2008): 25–26.
- "American Education Systems in a Global Context". Technology in Society 30, no. 3 (July 2008): 279–291.
- "Enterprise: The Path to Transformation for Emerging Public Universities." The Presidency (American Council on Education) 10, no. 2 (Spring 2007): 24–30.
- "None Dare Call It Hubris: The Limits of Knowledge." Issues in Science and Technology (Winter 2007): 1–4.
