= Abhijit Basu =

Indian geologist

Abhijit Basu is an American geologist of Indian origin. His research has focused on studying properties of rocky planetary bodies. He has been active in science education and is Class of 1948 Herman B Wells Endowed Professor (Emeritus since 2003) at Indiana University Bloomington.

== Biography ==
Basu was born in Calcutta (now Kolkata), India. He is the eldest son of painter Atul Bose. He received his B.Sc. in geology from Calcutta's Presidency College (now Presidency University, Kolkata) and M.Sc. from the Calcutta University. He worked as a geologist for the Geological Survey of India for about ten years.

A Fulbright program grant enabled him to move to the USA. He got his Ph.D. in 1975 from Indiana University Bloomington and was a post-doctoral researcher at Harvard University and NASA. He has been teaching at Indiana University since 1979 where he is an emeritus professor in Indiana University's Department of Earth and Atmospheric Sciences. He is married to Ilora Basu and is the father of musician Joy Basu.

== Career ==
Basu's academic contributions include studying differences in rock formation on Earth, the Moon, and Mars, among others. His research is widely cited. He has guided many Ph.D. dissertations and masters thesis. He has served as an officer in scholarly bodies and has been an associate editor for many scholarly publications.

The Geological Society of America (GSA) gave its highest service award to Basu in 2006. The award recognized him as a scientist who has "received many national and international awards and honors and is the creator of a large body of work and publications." The award specifically acknowledged his contributions to expansion of the society's publications program. The number of books published by the GSA has doubled during Basu's 10-year editorial term.

Basu has received Distinguished Service Awards from Indiana University Bloomington and the North American Bengali Conference.
