= Scott Atran =

American-French cultural anthropologist

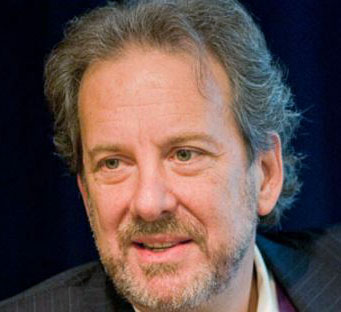
- Born: February 6, 1952 (age 74); New York City, New York
- Education: Columbia University (BA, PhD); Johns Hopkins University (MA)
- Scientific career
- Fields: Anthropology, ethnography
- Workplaces: École pratique des hautes études Cambridge University; Oxford University; Hebrew University of Jerusalem; University of Michigan; John Jay College of Criminal Justice; Centre national de la recherche scientifique École normale supérieure
- Doctoral advisor: Margaret Mead

Scott Atran (born February 6, 1952) is an American-French cultural anthropologist who is Emeritus Director of Research in Anthropology at the Centre national de la recherche scientifique in Paris, Research Professor at the University of Michigan, and cofounder of ARTIS International and of the Centre for the Resolution of Intractable Conflict at Oxford University. He has studied and written about terrorism, violence, religion, indigenous environmental management and the cross-cultural foundations of biological classification; and he has done fieldwork with terrorists and Islamic fundamentalists, as well as political leaders and Native American peoples.

== Early life and education ==
Atran was born in New York City in 1952. While a student at Columbia University, he became assistant to anthropologist Margaret Mead at the American Museum of Natural History. He received his BA from Columbia College, MA from Johns Hopkins University, and PhD in anthropology from Columbia University.

== Career ==
Atran has taught at Cambridge University, Hebrew University in Jerusalem, the École pratique des hautes études and École polytechnique in Paris, and John Jay College of Criminal Justice in New York City. He is emeritus research director in anthropology at the French National Centre for Scientific Research and member of the Jean Nicod Institute at the École normale supérieure. He is also research professor of public policy and psychology at the University of Michigan, founding fellow of the Centre for the Resolution of Intractable Conflict at Oxford University, and cofounder of ARTIS International. He was elected as a fellow of the Cognitive Science Society and a member of the U.S. National Academy of Sciences.

=== Early years ===
In 1974 he originated a debate at the Royaumont Abbey in France on the nature of universals in human thought and society. Other participants included linguist Noam Chomsky, psychologist Jean Piaget, anthropologists Gregory Bateson and Claude Lévi-Strauss, and biologists François Jacob and Jacques Monod. Howard Gardner and others consider this event a milestone in the development of cognitive science and its integration into the wider scientific community.

=== Research ===
Atran has experimented on the ways scientists and ordinary people categorize and reason about nature, on the evolutionary psychology and cognitive science of religion, and on the limits of rationality in understanding and managing deep-seated cultural and political conflict. His work has been widely published internationally in the popular press, and in scientific journals in a variety of disciplines. He has briefed members of the US Congress and the National Security Council staff with documents and presentations including "The Devoted Actor versus the Rational Actor in World Conflict", "Comparative Anatomy and Evolution of Global Network Terrorism" and "Pathways to and from Violent Extremism". He was an early critic of U.S. intervention in Iraq and of deepening involvement in Afghanistan. In April 2015, he addressed the United Nations Security Council on "Youth, Peace, and Security."

Atran has also been a staunch opponent of political attempts to eliminate government funding for social science, arguing that it is critical to the national interest, including innovation and security in business, technology, medicine and defense.

==== On conflict negotiation ====
Atran has published research on the limits of rational choice in political and cultural conflict.

He has collaborated on research on how political negotiations could be made more likely to produce agreement. Atran and the psychologists Jeremy Ginges and Douglas Medin and political scientist Khalil Shikaki conducted an experiment that surveyed "600 Jewish settlers in the West Bank, more than 500 Palestinian refugees, and more than 700 Palestinian students, half of whom identified with Hamas and Palestinian Islamic Jihad." The researchers divided the subjects into three groups, each presented with a different "hypothetical peace deal." In the basic situation, those surveyed were presented with "a two-state solution in which the Israelis would withdraw from 99 percent of the West Bank and Gaza but would not have to absorb Palestinian refugees"; the proposal "did not go over well." For the second group, the hypothetical deal "was sweetened with cash compensation from the United States and the European Union, such as a billion dollars a year for a hundred years, or a guarantee that the people would live in peace and prosperity. With these sweeteners on the table, the nonabsolutists, as expected, softened their opposition a bit. But the absolutists, forced to contemplate a taboo tradeoff, were even more disgusted, angry, and prepared to resort to violence." But for the third group, the proposed two-state solution was "augmented with a purely symbolic declaration by the enemy in which it compromised on one of its sacred values."

In the deal presented to Israeli settlers, the Palestinians "would give up any claims to their right of return" or "would be required to recognize the historic and legitimate right of the Jewish people to Eretz Israel"; in that presented to the Palestinians, Israel "would recognize the historic and legitimate right of the Palestinians to their own state and would apologize for all wrongs done to the Palestinian people," or would "give up what they believe is their sacred right to the West Bank" or would "symbolically recognize the historic legitimacy of the right of return [without in fact granting it]". In summarizing the result, cognitive psychologist Steven Pinker claims, "Unlike the bribes of money or peace, the symbolic concession of a sacred value by the enemy, especially when it acknowledges a sacred value on one's own side, reduced the absolutists' anger, disgust, and willingness to endorse violence."

In a study of Middle East leaders published in Science (journal), Atran interviewed leaders, as distinct from popular views. In the earlier responses, people rejected material concessions without symbolic concessions, but were open to negotiations that started with symbolic concessions. Leaders responded the same way, except that they saw the symbolic concession as only an introduction to significant material concessions as well.

For example, when the researchers asked Mousa Abu Marzook, deputy chairman of Hamas, about a trade-off for peace without granting a right of return, he said "No." When he was offered a trade-off with a substantial material incentive, he said "No" even more emphatically; "we do not sell ourselves for any amount." But when he was offered an apology, he said "Yes," although an apology would only be a beginning. "Our houses and land were taken away from us and something has to be done about that."

Similarly, when the researchers asked Binyamin Netanyahu (then opposition leader), "Would you seriously consider accepting a two-state solution following the 1967 borders if all major Palestinian factions, including Hamas, were to recognize the right of the Jewish people to an independent state in the region?" he said, "Yes, but the Palestinians would have to show that they sincerely mean it, change their textbooks and anti-Semitic characterizations and then allow some border adjustments so that Ben Gurion [Airport] would be out of range of shoulder-fired missiles."

Atran has worked with the United Nations Security Council and has been engaged in conflict negotiations in the Middle East.

==== Field research on terrorism ====
His work on the ideology and social evolution of transnational terrorism, which has included fieldwork with mujahedin and supporters in Europe, the Middle East, Central and Southeast Asia, and North Africa, has challenged common assumptions. Cognitive psychologist Steven Pinker summarizes some of Atran's findings thus:

Far from being ignorant, impoverished, nihilistic, or mentally ill, suicide terrorists tend to be educated, middle class, morally engaged, and free of obvious psychopathology. Atran concluded that many of the motives may be found in nepotistic altruism... [Atran shows that] Hamas and other Palestinian terrorist groups [hold] out a carrot rather than a stick to the terrorist's family in the form of generous monthly stipends, lump-sum payments, and massive prestige in the community.... Atran has [also] found that suicide terrorists can be recruited without these direct incentives. Probably the most effective call to martyrdom is the opportunity to join a happy band of brothers. Terrorist cells often begin as gangs of underemployed single young men who come together in cafes, dorms, soccer clubs, barbershops, or Internet chat rooms and suddenly find meaning in their lives by a commitment to the new platoon.... Commitment to the group is intensified by religion, not just the literal promise of paradise but the feeling of spiritual awe that comes from submerging oneself in a crusade, a calling, a vision quest, or a jihad. [Atran writes that religion] may also turn a commitment to a cause into a sacred value — a good that may not be traded off against something else, including life itself. The commitment can be further stoked by the thirst for revenge, which in the case of militant Islamism takes the form of vengeance for the harm and humiliation suffered by any Muslim anywhere on the planet at any time in history, or for symbolic affronts such as the presence of infidel soldiers on sacred Muslim soil.

Atran has summarized his work and conclusions:

When you look at young people like the ones who grew up to blow up trains in Madrid in 2004, carried out the slaughter on the London underground in 2005, hoped to blast airliners out of the sky en route to the United States in 2006 and 2009, and journeyed far to die killing infidels in Iraq, Afghanistan, Pakistan, Yemen or Somalia; when you look at whom they idolize, how they organize, what bonds them and what drives them; then you see that what inspires the most lethal terrorists in the world today is not so much the Koran or religious teachings as a thrilling cause and call to action that promises glory and esteem in the eyes of friends, and through friends, eternal respect and remembrance in the wider world that they will never live to enjoy.... Jihad is an egalitarian, equal-opportunity employer: ...fraternal, fast-breaking, thrilling, glorious, and cool.

— Scott Atran, Testimony before U.S. Senate

Regarding Atran's analysis of the Islamic State of Iraq and the Levant as a revolutionary movement of "world-historic proportions," a writer for The New York Times considers Atran:

...a top anthropologist in Paris [who has combined] his research among disaffected youth with insights from such disparate figures as Hitler, Burke, Darwin and Hobbes, as well as close observation of the Islamic State's advance into a 'globe-spanning jihadi archipelago'. He argues that we dismiss ISIS at our peril, and that in fact, we do much to promote its growth. Some of his historical conclusions will be controversial, but this is French intellectualism at its most profound — and most useful. Here's a telling anecdote: When Charlie Chaplin and the French filmmaker René Clair watched 'Triumph of the Will' (1935), Leni Riefenstahl's visual paean to National Socialism, 'Chaplin laughed but Clair was terror-stricken, fearing that, if it were shown more widely, all might be lost in the West'.

The Chronicle of Higher Education accompanied Atran to frontlines in the battle against ISIS in Iraq, where he and his research team were assessing "will to fight" among the combatants:

Atran fleshes out what he calls the 'Devoted Actor Framework' [as opposed to standard 'rational actor' frameworks], which pulls sacred values [which are immune to material trade offs] and identity fusion [complete merging of individual identity with group identity] into a single theory and offers advice for beating ISIS: 'The science suggests that sacred values are best opposed with other sacred values that inspire devotion, or by sundering the fused social networks that embed those values.' Left unspoken: How do you offer an equally inspiring alternative? By what method can those social networks be sundered? Atran doesn't pretend to know the answer, but he does think that current attempts at so-called "countermessaging" are destined to fail because those messages are 'disembodied from the social networks in which ideas are embedded and given life.' Scholarly squabbles aside, there is near-universal admiration, bordering on awe, for how Atran is able to collect data in the midst of a violent conflict."

A series of experimental studies directed by Atran and social psychologist Ángel Gómez performed with captured ISIS fighters, fighters of the Kurdistan Workers Party (PKK), Peshmerga, Iraq Army and Arab Sunni Militia in Iraq, as well as with thousands of ordinary European citizens, have further elaborated the Devoted Actor framework in an effort to "help to inform policy decisions for the common defense." According to reporting from CNN:

The researchers discovered that three crucial factors motivate both ISIS fighters and those fighting them: a deep commitment to sacred values, the readiness to forsake family for those values, and the perceived spiritual strength of the group or community that the fighter represents. [But] 'in our material world, we have underestimated or underplayed the spiritual dimension of human action,' [Atran] said. 'Doing so runs the risk of leaving ourselves open to people who are motivated by deeper spiritual and sacred values and virtues, and I think that's the greatest danger we face.'

Atran argues in an interview in The Washington Post that: "Never in history have so few people with so few means caused so much fear." He and his research colleagues at ARTIS International contend that:

Despite intense efforts by intelligence agencies and countless conferences, articles, and books, fundamental aspects of terrorism remain unclear: What identifies terrorists before they act; how do they radicalize; what motivates their violence; when do they act; what countermeasures are most effective? These efforts to find answers have fallen short in part because... policymakers tend to fit such information to prevailing paradigms in foreign policy, military doctrine, and criminal justice, each with serious drawbacks when applied to terrorism."

Atran and colleagues propose an alternative approach, driven by theoretically framed field research that ground-truths big data and informs policy-making while maintaining intellectual independence. In 2017, Atran co-authored a groundbreaking paper with Angel Gomez, Lucia Lopez-Rodriguez, Hammad Sheikh, Jeremy Ginges, Lydia Wilson, Hoshang Waziri, Alexandra Vazquez, and Richard Davis. Titled 'The Devoted Actor's Will to Fight and the Spiritual Dimension of Human Conflict', the piece focuses on the spiritual dimensions of conflict based upon field work in Iraq with combatants and lab studies, assessing non-utilitarian dimensions of conflict. Atran and his team have validated aspects of these behavioral findings in neuroimaging studies of radicalized individuals in Europe, including greater willingness to fight and die for sacred versus non-sacred values that involves inhibition of deliberative reasoning in favor of rapid, duty-bound responses.

=== Other work ===
Atran conducts ongoing research in Guatemala, Mexico, and the U.S. on universal and culture-specific aspects of biological categorization and environmental reasoning and decision making among Maya and other Native Americans. His research team has focused on immigration of Spanish-speaking Ladinos and highland Q'eqchi' people of Guatemala into the northern lowland Petén region, and their interaction with the lowland Itza whose language is near extinction but whose agro-forestry practices, including use of dietary and medicinal plants, may still tell us much about pre-colonial management of the Maya lowlands. Atran found that the Itza' rejected majority-culture offers for exploiting natural resources as violating spiritual injunctions that may represent the summary wisdom of centuries of experience; however, later follow-up studies suggest that this wisdom, and the sustainable practices it encouraged, are vanishing as the last Itza speakers die out.

Atran's debates with Sam Harris, Dan Dennett, Richard Dawkins and others during the 2006 Beyond Belief symposium on the limits of reason and the role of religion in modern society highlight the differences between these authors, who see religion as fundamentally false beliefs associated with primitive cosmology, as well as politically and socially repressive, and Atran who sees unfalsifiable but semantically absurd religious beliefs and binding ritual obligations as historically critical to the formation and social cohesion of large-scale societies and current motivators for both conflict and cooperation.

== Bibliography ==
=== As sole author ===
- Cognitive Foundations of Natural History: Towards an Anthropology of Science, Cambridge University Press, 1993; ISBN 978-0-521-43871-1
- In Gods We Trust: The Evolutionary Landscape of Religion, Oxford University Press, 2002; ISBN 978-0-19-803405-6
- Talking to the Enemy: Sacred Values, Violent Extremism, and What it Means to be Human, Penguin, 2011; ISBN 978-0241951767
- L'Etat islamique est une révolution, Les Liens qui Libèrent Editions, 2016; ISBN 979-1020903983

=== As editor or co-author ===
- Histoire du concept d'espece dans les sciences de la vie, ed. (1987)
- Folkbiology, ed. with Douglas Medin, MIT Press (1999)
- Plants of the Peten Itza' Maya, with Ximena Lois and Edilberto Ucan Ek, University of Michigan Museums Press (2004)
- The Native Mind and the Cultural Construction of Nature, with Douglas Medin, MIT Press (2008)
- "Values, Empathy, and Fairness Across Social Barriers". ed., Annals of the New York Academy of Sciences, with Oscar Vilarroya, Arcadi Navarro, Kevin Ochsner and Adolf Tobeña (2009)
