= Monique Borgerhoff Mulder =

American evolutionary anthropologist

- Born: April 1953 (age 73); Den Haag, Holland
- Spouse: Tim Caro

Academic background
- Education: B.A., M.A Hons, Social Anthropology, 1975, University of Edinburgh; Ph.D., Anthropology, 1987, Northwestern University
- Thesis: Marriage and reproduction in the Kipsigis of Kenya (1987)

Academic work
- Institutions: University of California, Davis; Max Planck Institute for Evolutionary Anthropology

Monique Borgerhoff Mulder (born April 1953) is an American evolutionary anthropologist. She is a Distinguished Research Professor in the Department of Anthropology at the University of California, Davis.

== Early life and education ==
Borgerhoff Mulder was born in April 1953 in Den Haag, Holland but was raised in Beirut and Great Britain. She completed her Bachelor of Arts and Master of Arts degrees at the University of Edinburgh and her PhD in anthropology at Northwestern University.

== Career ==
Following her PhD and post-doctoral fellowship at the University of Michigan, Borgerhoff Mulder joined the anthropology faculty at the University of California, Davis in 1990. Borgerhoff Mulder and her husband Tim Caro began conducting research in Mpimbwe, Tanzania, in 1995 which evolved to her gathering detailed economic, health and social information on the families in Kibaoni. She continued to work with members of the community as her research evolved to understanding the dynamics of polygyny. In 2015, Borgerhoff Mulder's research team compared polygynous and monogamous households in 56 villages in northern Tanzania to see how their access to food and healthier children differed.

Borgerhoff Mulder retired from UC Davis in 2019 and joined the Max Planck Institute for Evolutionary Anthropology in Germany. In August 2021, Borgerhoff Mulder became an external researcher at the Santa Fe Institute. Later that month, she was elected a Member of the National Academy of Sciences for her projects relating to life history, inequality, natural resource management and patterned cultural variation.
