= Pauline Wiessner =

American anthropologist

Pauline Wiessner (Polly W. Wiessner) is an American anthropologist who focused on cultural anthropology. She is currently a professor at University of Utah. Wiessner has held various professor positions at Universities in the United States, Denmark, and France and various positions in Universities and communities across the world. During her research she work with Ju/’hoansi Bushmen of the Kalahari in South Africa to learn about the social networks and Enga of Papua New Guinea to learn about their customs of exchange, ritual and warfare.

== Education ==
Polly Wiessner received her bachelor's degree in creative writing from Sarah Lawrence University in 1969. In 1977 she received her Ph.D. in anthropology from the University of Michigan, Ann Arbor. Her doctoral committee included Henry Wright, Richard Alexander, Kent Flannery, Richard Ford, and Aram Yengoyan.

== Career and research ==
Wiessner has conducted ethnographic research as a research associate at the Max Planck Institute in Germany. She has been a professor at the University of Utah, department of Anthropology and Arizona State University and a research professor at the University of Utah. Wiessner has previously been a visiting professor at the University of Aarhus in Denmark and Ecole des Hautes Etudes in Paris, France.

Polly Wiessner worked with the Ju/’hoansi (!Kung Bushmen). She focused on why hunters aimed to kill large game knowing the meat will feed more than enough people.

Wiessner has spent 40 years studying the effects of modern technology on traditional cultural practices, in particular the Kalahari San people of Southern Africa and the Enga of Papua New Guinea. From 1973 to 1977, her early research focused on the change in social connections and unproductive social time among the Kalahari foragers as they transition from hunter-gatherers to a mixed economy. For the past 30 years, she has studied how modern weaponry has affected the war traditions and the relationships of the Egna.

Wiessner has researched how the use of firelight in prehistoric human populations led to increased chances for socialization after dark. While researching firelight she looked at how the extended awake time shifted circadian rhythms and led to an extended work day, causing unproductive economic hours and productive social hours.

In addition to her research, Wiessner heads various philanthropic efforts, mostly to secure continued food and water resources for the cultures she has worked with. In Papua New Guinea, she founded the Tradition and Transition Centre to preserve Egna traditions and artifacts in their original context and keep the knowledge of their cultural heritage alive. The Enga Take Anda have started to integrate cultural education into all the schools of Enga Province are doing so with educational materials produced by Wiessner. She wrote an ethnography of Enga culture for schools, the public and a Teacher's Guide that provides detailed instructions for integrating cultural education into the school curriculum for grades 6–9. Cultural education is now officially a part of curriculum.

== Selected publications ==
A. Fuentes and P. Wiessner. (Editors) Reintegrating Anthropology. 2016. Special Issue of Current Anthropology Supplement 13. Vol. 57.

P, Wiessner; A. Tumu; and N. Pupu. Enga culture and Community. 2016. Birdwing Press, Port Moresby.

P. Wiessner; R. Minape; and L.M. Malala. Teacher Guide to the Enga Cultural Education Pilot Program. 2016. Brirdwing Press, Port Moresby.

Wiessner, P. and A. Tumu. Historical Vines: Enga Networks of Exchange, Ritual and Warfare in Papua New Guinea. 1998. Smithsonian Institution Press, Washington D.C.

(Edited volume) Food and the Status Quest. Edited by P. Wiessner and Wulf Schiefenhövel. 1996. Berghahn Books, Oxford.

A. Kyakas and P. Wiessner, From Inside the Women's House: The lives and traditions of Enga women. 1992. Robert Brown, Brisbane.

A. Tumu, P. Munini, A. Kyangali and P. Wiessner. A View of Enga Culture. 1989. Kristen Press, Madang.

Pupu, N. and P. Wiessner. The Challenges of Village Courts and Operation Mekim Save among the Enga of Papua New Guinea Today: A View from the Inside. Department of Pacific Affairs. Discussion Paper. 2018: Australian National University.

Wiessner, P. Taking the risk out of risky transactions: A forager's dilemma. In Risky Transactions, edited by F. Salter. 2002. Oxford: Berghahn Books.

Wiessner, P. Reconsidering the behavioral basis for style: A case study among the Kalahari San. 1984. Journal of Anthropological Archaeology 3:190-234.

== Activism ==
Wiessner established the Tradition and Transition Fund in 2006, a non-profit that addresses the current needs of the populations she has studied: food security for the Kalahari Bushman and constructing a museum/research center in Enga, the Enga Take Anda or ‘house of traditional knowledge’.

== Awards and honors ==
- University of Utah distinguished Scholarly and Creative Research Award (2010)
- Elected fellow of Wings World Quest, Women of Discovery (2011)
- Prize Winner, Spanish Geographical Society, Madrid (2014)
- Elected to the National Academy of Sciences (2014)
- Distinguished Professor, University of Utah (2015)
- Queen's Jubilee Medal from Papua New Guinea Government for service in preserving cultural knowledge through the Tradition and Transition Centre (2019)
