= Robert M. Walker (physicist) =

Robert M. Walker (February 6, 1929 – February 12, 2004) was an American physicist, a planetary scientist, the founder and director of McDonnell Center for the Space Sciences at Washington University in St. Louis, noted for his co-discovery of the etchability of nuclear particle tracks in solids, as well as his conjecture that meteorites and lunar rocks contain a record of the ancient radiation history of various stars including the Sun. Asteroid 6372 was named Walker in his honor by the International Astronomical Union. Walker was a member of the National Academy of Sciences. Walker was also a fellow of the American Physical Society, the American Geophysical Union, the Meteoritical Society and the American Association for the Advancement of Science. He was also a founder and the first president of Volunteers in Technical Assistance (VITA).

== Notable distinctions ==
- 1964 American Nuclear Society Annual Award
- 1966 Yale Engineering Association Annual Award for Contributions to Basic and Applied Science
- 1967 Doctor, honoris causa, Union College
- 1970 NASA Exceptional Scientific Achievement Award
- 1971 E. O. Lawrence Memorial Award of the U.S. Atomic Energy Commission
- 1973 Elected to the National Academy of Sciences
- 1975 Docteur, honoris causa, University of Clermont-Ferrand, France
- 1985 Antarctic Service Medal of the National Science Foundation
- 1991 J. Lawrence Smith Medal, National Academy of Sciences
- 1992 Officier de l’Ordre des Palmes Academiques
- 1993 Leonard Medal of the Meteoritical Society
- 1997 Peter Raven Lifetime Achievement Award, St. Louis Academy of Science
- 1999 Asteroid 6372 named Walker by International Astronomical Union
- 2004 Doctor, honoris causa (posthumous), Washington University in St. Louis

== Life and career ==
- February 6, 1929, born in Philadelphia, Pennsylvania
- 1950 graduated from Union College with a degree in physics
- 1954 Ph.D. in physics, Yale University
- 1966 the McDonnell Professor of Physics, Washington University in St. Louis
- February 12, 2004 died in Brussels, Belgium stomach cancer

== Personal life ==
Walker was married to the cosmochemist Ghislaine Crozaz.
