= George R. Milner =

American archaeologist

George R. Milner is an American archaeologist in the Department of Anthropology at The Pennsylvania State University. He has done archaeological research on sites encompassing a range of time periods in Illinois, Missouri, Wisconsin, and Kentucky, and has also worked in Egypt and Saipan (Micronesia). He has worked with prehistoric and historic human skeletal remains from eastern North America, Denmark, and Egypt. By using modern samples of known age from the United States, Switzerland, and Portugal, he has helped refine skeletal age estimation techniques.

== Background ==
George Milner grew up in northern Virginia and attended Beloit College in Wisconsin, graduating with a BA in anthropology in 1975. He received his MA in 1976 from Northwestern University, and PhD in 1982 (dissertation entitled Measuring Prehistoric Levels of Health: A Study of Mississippian Period Skeletal Remains from the American Bottom, Illinois).

== Career ==
Milner is a professor in the Department of Anthropology at Pennsylvania State University, where he has been employed since 1986. Earlier he worked on the FAI-270 Archaeological Project for the University of Illinois from 1978 to 1983, both as a Biological Anthropologist and an Archaeological Site Director. From 1983 to 1984, he was a Postdoctoral Fellow in the Department of Anthropology at the Smithsonian Institution, and from 1984 to 1986 he was the Director-Curator of the Museum of Anthropology at the University of Kentucky. While at The Pennsylvania State University, he was also Curator of the Anthropology Museum for several years.

== Key excavations ==
Beginning as a student in 1971, Milner has participated on many archaeological surveys and excavations in Illinois, Missouri, Wisconsin, and Kentucky. On the FAI-270 highway project, he directed major excavations at Julien, Turner-DeMange, Robinson’s Lake, and the East St. Louis Stone Quarry Cemetery. He has also studied many collections, including prehistoric and historic skeletons, from the United States, Denmark, Saipan, and Egypt.

== Awards and honors ==
In 1975, he became a member of Phi Beta Kappa (Beloit College), and in 1999 he received the Distinction in the Social Sciences for the College of Liberal Arts at The Pennsylvania State University. He has been a Fellow of American Association for the Advancement of Science since 2002.

== Research emphases ==
Milner is best known for his work on the prehistory of eastern North America and especially on the Mississippian period in the Midwest. His research on Cahokia has shown that while the site is truly impressive, the sociopolitical system was less centralized and the area was not as heavily populated as once thought. Combining archaeological site (palisaded villages) and skeletal (trauma) data, he has shown that conflict in prehistoric eastern North America, while it had a many thousand year history, varied considerably in intensity over time and space. Currently, he is working on methods to improve skeletal age estimation to refine paleodemographic estimates; one outcome of this work is that people in the past lived longer than is commonly thought.

== Selected books and monographs ==
- The Moundbuilders: Ancient Peoples of Eastern North America. 2004. Thames and Hudson, London.
- The Cahokia Chiefdom: The Archaeology of a Mississippian Society. 1998. Smithsonian Institution Press, Washington, DC.
- In the Wake of Contact: Biological Responses to Conquest. 1993. (C.S. Larsen, G.R. Milner, editors). Wiley-Liss, New York.
- The Julien Site. 1984. University of Illinois Press, Urbana.
- The East St. Louis Stone Quarry Site Cemetery. 1983. University of Illinois Press, Urbana.
- The Turner and DeMange Sites. 1983. University of Illinois Press, Urbana

== Selected papers ==
- Archaic Burial Sites in the Midcontinent. 2009. (G. R. Milner, J. E. Buikstra, M. D. Wiant). Archaic Societies: Diversity and Complexity Across the Midcontinent, T.E. Emerson, D. McElrath, and A. Fortier (eds.), pp. 115–135. State University of New York Press, Albany.
- Advances in Paleodemography. 2008. G.R Milner, J.W. Wood, J.L. Boldsen). Biological Anthropology of the Human Skeleton, 2nd ed. M.A. Katzenberg and S.R. Saunders (eds.), pp. 561–600. Wiley-Liss, New York.
- Warfare, Population, and Food Production in Prehistoric Eastern North America. 2007. Warfare and Violence Among the Indigenous Peoples of North America: Problems in Paradise. R.J. Chacon and R.G. Mendoza (eds.), pp. 182–201.University of Arizona Press, Tucson.
- A New Deal for Human Osteology. 2006. (G.R. Milner, K.P. Jacobi). Bioarchaeology: The Contextual Analysis of Human Remains. J.E. Buikstra and L. Beck (eds.), pp. 113–129. Elsevier, Amsterdam.
- Cybertools in Archaeology. 2006. (D.R. Snow, M. Gahegan, C.L. Giles, K.G. Hirth, G.R. Milner, P, Mitra, J.Z. Wang). Science 311:958-959.
- Osteological Applications of High-Resolution Computed Tomography: A Prehistoric Arrow Injury. 2006. (T.M. Ryan, G.R. Milner). Journal of Archaeological Science 33:871-879
- Skeletal Biology: Northeast. 2006. (G.R. Milner, J.E. Buikstra). Handbook of North American Indians: Environment, Origins, and Population, vol. 3, D. H. Ubelaker (ed.), pp. 630–639. Smithsonian Institution Press, Washington, DC.
- Archaic Hunter-Gatherer Landscape Use in West-Central Kentucky. 2005. (R.W. Jefferies, V.D. Thompson, G.R. Milner) Journal of Field Archaeology 30:3-23.
- Nineteenth Century Arrow Wounds and Perceptions of Prehistoric Warfare. 2005. American Antiquity 70:144-156.
- Transition Analysis: A New Method for Estimating Age from Skeletons. 2002. (J.L. Boldsen, G.R. Milner, L.W. Konigsberg, J.W. Wood) Paleodemography: Age Distributions from Skeletal Samples. R.D. Hoppa and J.W. Vaupel (eds.), pp. 73–106. Cambridge University Press, Cambridge.
- The Distribution of Eastern Woodlands Peoples at the Prehistoric and Historic Interface. 2001. (G.R. Milner, D.G. Anderson, M.T. Smith). Societies in Eclipse: Archaeology of the Eastern Woodlands Indians, A.D. 1400-1700. D. Brose, C.W. Cowan, and R.C. Mainfort (eds.), pp. 9–18. Smithsonian Institution Press, Washington, DC.
- Palisaded Settlements in Prehistoric Eastern North America. 2000. City Walls. J.D. Tracy (ed.), pp. 46–70, Cambridge University Press, Cambridge, United Kingdom.
- Warfare in Prehistoric and Early Historic Eastern North America. 1999. (G.R. Milner). Journal of Archaeological Research 7:105-151.
- The Read Archaic Shell Midden in Kentucky. 1998. (G.R. Milner, R.W. Jefferies). Southeastern Archaeology 17:119-132.
- The Osteological Paradox: Problems of Inferring Prehistoric Health from Skeletal Samples. 1992 (J.W. Wood, G.R. Milner, H.C. Harpending, K.M. Weiss). Current Anthropology. 33:343-370.
- Warfare in Late Prehistoric West-Central Illinois. 1991. (G.R. Milner, E. Anderson, V.G. Smith). American Antiquity 56:581-603.
- Carnivore Alteration of Human Bone from a Late Prehistoric Site in Illinois. 1989. (G.R. Milner, V.G. Smith). American Journal of Physical Anthropology 79:43-49.
- Pattern Matching of Age-at-Death Distributions in Paleodemographic Analysis. 1989. (G.R. Milner, D.H. Humpf, H.C. Harpending). American Journal of Physical Anthropology 80:49-58.
- Mississippian Period Population Density in a Segment of the Central Mississippi River Valley. 1986. American Antiquity 51:227-2
- Social and Temporal Implications of Variation among American Bottom Mississippian Cemeteries. 1984. American Antiquity 49:468-488
