= Robert N. Clayton =

Canadian-American chemist and academic

- Born: March 20, 1930; Hamilton, Ontario
- Died: December 30, 2017 (aged 87); Indiana
- Scientific career
- Fields: Cosmochemistry
- Institutions: University of Chicago

Robert Norman Clayton FRS (March 20, 1930 – December 30, 2017) was a Canadian-American chemist and academic. He was the Enrico Fermi Distinguished Service Professor Emeritus of Chemistry at the University of Chicago. Clayton studied cosmochemistry and held a joint appointment in the university's geophysical sciences department. He was a member of the National Academy of Sciences and was named a fellow of several academic societies, including the Royal Society.

== Biography ==
Born in Hamilton, Ontario, Clayton grew up in a working-class family that supported (but could not pay for) his pursuit of higher education. None of Clayton's close family members had ever attended college. His high school teachers encouraged him to apply to Queen's University, and he received enough scholarship funding to attend the school. Clayton said that around half of his classmates were a decade older and had served in World War II. He said that this created a serious academic environment.

After graduating from Queen's University with undergraduate and master's degrees, Clayton completed a Ph.D. in 1955 at the California Institute of Technology, where he was mentored by geochemist Samuel Epstein. His first academic appointment was at Penn State University. In 1958, he joined the chemistry faculty at the University of Chicago, where he took over the laboratory of Nobel Prize winner Harold Urey. From 1961 to his retirement in 2001, he held joint appointments in the chemistry and geophysical sciences departments. He directed the Enrico Fermi Institute at the university from 1998 to 2001.

== Research ==
Clayton worked in the field of cosmochemistry and is best known for the use of the stable isotopes of oxygen to classify meteorites. He was aided in his research by Toshiko Mayeda, who was a specialist technician familiar with the mass spectrometry equipment required. Their first joint research paper described the use of bromine pentafluoride to extract oxygen from rocks and minerals. They developed several tests that were used across the field of meteorite and lunar sample analysis.

Clayton and Mayeda studied variations in the ratio of oxygen-17 and oxygen-18 to the most abundant isotope oxygen-16, building on their surprising finding that this ratio for oxygen-17 in particular was different from that found in terrestrial rock samples. They deduced that this difference was caused by the formation temperature of the meteorite and could thus be used as an "oxygen thermometer". They also worked on the mass spectroscopy and chemistry of the Allende meteorite and studied the Bocaiuva meteorite, finding that the Eagle Station meteorite was formed due to impact heating. They also analysed approximately 300 lunar samples that had been collected during NASAs Apollo Program. In 1992, a new type of meteorite, the Brachinite, was identified. Clayton and Mayeda studied the Achondrite meteorites and showed that variations in the oxygen isotope ratios within a planet are due to inhomogeneities in the solar nebula. They analysed Shergotty meteorites, proposing that there could have been a water-rich atmosphere in the past on Mars.

== Honours and awards ==
In 1981, he received the V. M. Goldschmidt Award from the Geochemical Society. The next year, the Meteoritical Society awarded him its Leonard Medal. Clayton won the Elliott Cresson Medal from the Franklin Institute in 1985. He was the 1987 recipient of the William Bowie Medal from the American Geophysical Union. Clayton became a member of the National Academy of Sciences in 1996 and won the academy's J. Lawrence Smith Medal in 2009. Clayton has been named a fellow of the Royal Society of London (1981) and the Royal Society of Canada. He won the National Medal of Science in 2004. In 2008, the book Oxygen in the Solar System was dedicated to Clayton.

On December 30, 2017, Clayton died his sleep at his home in Indiana from complications of Parkinson's disease.
