= Toshiko Mayeda =

Japanese American chemist

- no free image available
- Born: Toshiko K. Kuki; 1923; Tacoma, Washington
- Died: 13 February 2004 (aged 78–79)
- Education: University of Chicago
- Known for: Study of meteorites and of isotopes of oxygen
- Scientific career
- Workplaces: University of Chicago
- Academic advisors: Robert N. Clayton

Toshiko K. Mayeda (née Kuki) (1923–13 February 2004) was a Japanese American chemist who worked at the Enrico Fermi Institute in the University of Chicago. She worked on climate science and meteorites from 1958 to 2004.

== Early life and education ==
Toshiko Mayeda was born in Tacoma, Washington. She grew up in Yokkaichi, Mie, and Osaka. When the United States entered World War II after the Japanese attack on Pearl Harbor, she and her father Matsusaburo Kuki were sent to the Tule Lake War Relocation Center. Whilst there she met her future husband, Harry Mayeda. After the war, she graduated with a bachelor's degree in chemistry from the University of Chicago in 1949.

== Research ==
Mayeda worked initially as a laboratory assistant to Harold Urey at the University of Chicago, where she was hired initially to wash glassware. They used mass spectrometry to measure oxygen isotopes in the shells of marine molluscs which gave information on the prehistoric temperatures of ocean waters and hence paleoclimates. Urey developed the field of cosmochemistry and with Mayeda studied primitive meteorites, also by using oxygen isotope analysis. Later, she worked with Cesare Emiliani on isotopic evaluation of the ice age. When Urey retired from the university in 1958, Mayeda was persuaded to remain there by Robert N. Clayton, and collaborate with him on applications of mass spectroscopy. She was described as an indomitable research assistant.

Mayeda and Clayton's first research paper considered the use of Bromine pentafluoride to extract Isotopes of oxygen from rocks and minerals. It remains their most cited work. From the 1970s until the late 1990s Mayeda and Clayton became famous for their use of oxygen isotopes to classify meteorites. They developed several tests that were used across the field of meteorite and lunar sample analysis. They studied variations in the abundances of the stable isotopes of oxygen, oxygen-16, oxygen-17 and oxygen-18, and deduced differences in the formation temperatures of the meteorites. They also worked on the mass spectroscopy and chemistry of the Allende meteorite. They published many scientific papers on the "oxygen thermometer" and analysed approximately 300 lunar samples that had been collected during NASAs Apollo Program. In 1992, a new type of meteorite, the Brachinite, was identified. Clayton and Mayeda studied the Achondrite meteorites and showed that variations in the oxygen-17 isotope ratios within a planet are due to inhomogeneities in the Solar Nebula. They analysed Shergotty meteorites, proposing that there could have been a water-rich atmosphere on Mars and studied the Bocaiuva meteorite, finding that the Eagle Station meteorite was formed due to impact heating.

In 2002 Mayeda was awarded the Society Merit Prize from the Geochemical Society of Japan. In the same year, an asteroid was named after her. Mayeda's husband, Harry, died in 2003. Mayeda suffered from cancer and died on February 13, 2004. In 2008, the book Oxygen in the Solar System was dedicated to Clayton and Mayeda.
