= Eagle Station group =

Small group of meteors

- — Group —
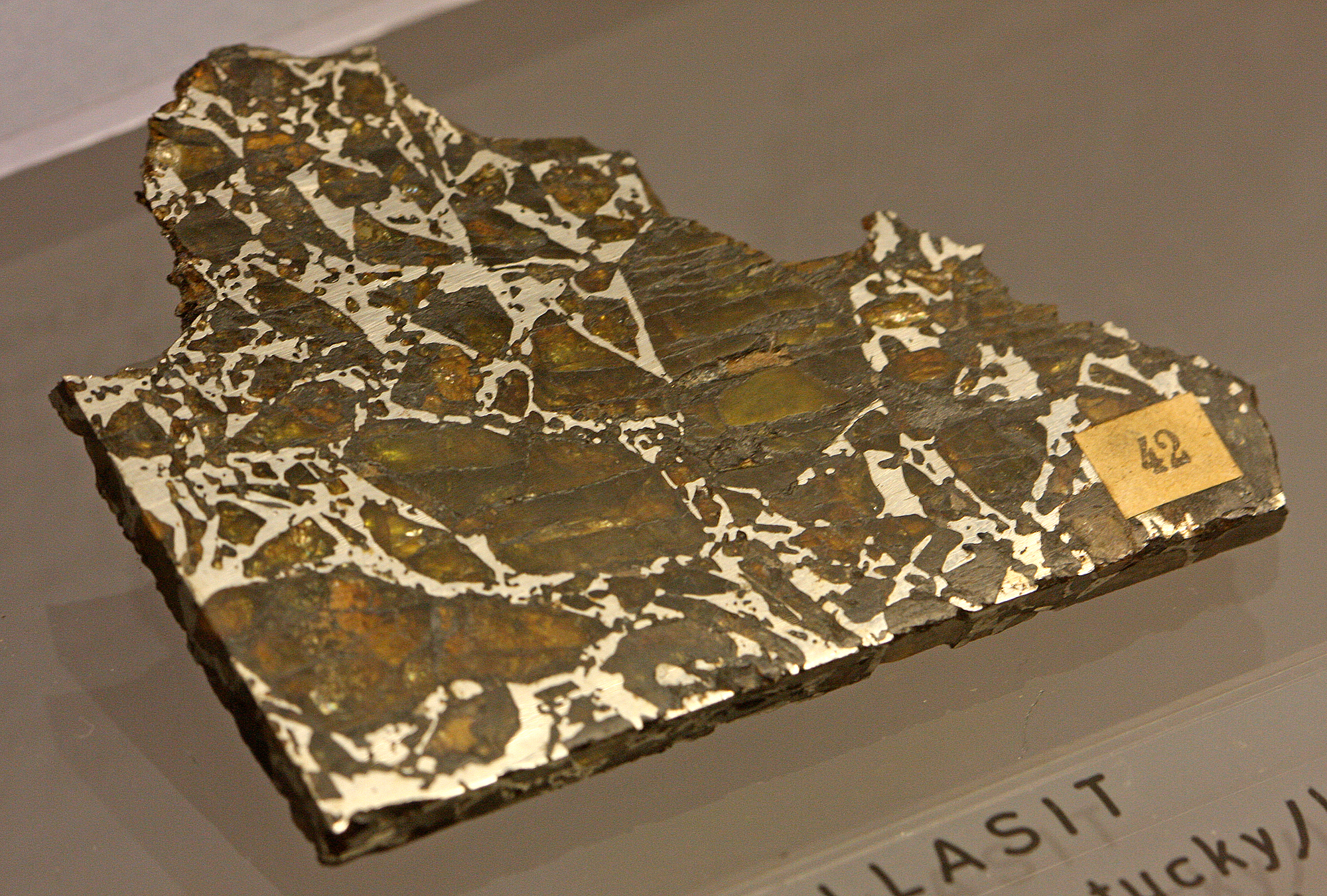
- Eagle Station meteorite, type specimen for the group
- Type: Stony-iron
- Class: Pallasite
- Composition: Meteoric iron, silicates
- Total known specimens: 5

The Eagle Station group (abbreviated PES – Pallasite Eagle Station) is a set of pallasite meteorite specimen that do not fit into any of the other defined pallasite groups. In meteorite classification, five meteorites have to be found, so they can be defined as their own group. Currently, only five Eagle Station type meteorites have been found, which is just enough for a separate group.

== Naming and history ==
The Eagle Station group is named after the Eagle Station meteorite, the type specimen of the group. It is in turn named after Eagle Station, Carroll County Kentucky where it was found.

== Description ==
The Eagle Station group has a composition similar to Main group pallasites. Diagnostic differences are that the olivine is richer in iron and calcium. The group also has a distinct oxygen isotope signature.

The meteoric iron is similar to the IIF iron meteorites. This might indicate that Eagle station group and IIF formed close to each other in the solar nebula.

== Parent body ==
The trace elements in the phosphates of the Eagle Station group are distinct from other pallasites. Most pallasites are believed to be derived from the core–mantle boundary. Trace elements indicate that the Eagle Station group came from shallower depths of their parent body.

== Notable specimen ==
Only five specimen have been found so far:

- Cold Bay meteorite
- Eagle Station meteorite (type specimen)
- Itzawisis meteorite
- Karavannoe meteorite
- Oued Bourdim 001

== See also ==
- Glossary of meteoritics
