= Bya =

Abbreviation for "billion years ago"

BYA or B.Y.A. is an abbreviation for "Billion Years Ago". It is used as a unit of time to denote length of time before the present, in 10^{9} years. This initialism is often used in the sciences of astronomy, geology, and paleontology.

The "billion" in bya is the 10^{9} "billion" of the short scale of the United States, not the long-scale 10^{12} "billion" of some European usage. Billion by this convention (10^{9}) is often called a "thousand million" in the UK and a "milliard" in some other countries. For this reason, there is potential for some confusion, and some scientists prefer the unit Gya, while others prefer Ga (Giga-annum); however, bya remains in more widespread use. In 1974, the UK switched from the long scale to the short scale.

Related units are mya ("million years ago"), and byr ("billion years"), which are traditionally written uncapitalized, while Ga or Gya starts with a capital letter.

== See also ==
- Geologic time scale
- Before Present
