= Coatlicue (star) =

Hypothetical star which gave life to the Sun

Coatlicue is a hypothetical star proposed to have induced the formation of the Sun, then exploded as a supernova, seeding the Solar System with short-lived radioisotopes. Coatlicue would have been at least thirty times the mass of the Sun, and while on the main sequence, its strong winds would have compressed the dust and gas of the local nebula and given birth to hundreds of stars, including the Sun. The existence and characteristics of this star were proposed to explain the presence of aluminium-26 in meteorites, which could have been expelled in the winds of the massive star.

Cōātlīcue is the mother of the Sun in Aztec cosmogony. This name is unofficial; it was proposed by Matthieu Gounelle and Georges Meynet.
