= Giant impacts phase of planetary formation =

Phase in planet formation with many collisions between large bodies

The giant impacts phase of planetary formation refers to the final stage of planetary formation, dominated by energetic collisions primarily driven by gravity. Planetary formation is a complex process that occurs within protoplanetary disks, where dust and gas coalesce to form celestial bodies. A critical stage in this process is the giant impacts phase, characterized by significant collisions between forming planetary bodies. These impacts play a pivotal role in shaping the structure, composition, and dynamics of planets and moons within a stellar system.

== History ==
Early theories of planet formation focused primarily on gradual accumulation of matter through processes like accretion. However, the giant impact hypothesis emerged in the following decades, proposing that substantial collisions between protoplanets could explain various planetary characteristics. Key milestones in this research include the formulation of the Giant-impact hypothesis for the Moon's formation and the development of computer simulations to model such events.

== Mechanisms of giant impacts ==
Giant impacts typically occur during the late stages of planetary formation, when protoplanets have grown large enough to exert significant gravitational influence. In a protoplanetary disk, the interplay of gravitational interactions can lead to the destabilization of orbits, resulting in collisions. These impacts can be colossal, with bodies comparable to Mars colliding with larger planets, leading to dramatic changes in structure and composition. In the event that both objects survive, they may collide again on a long enough timescale.

=== Governing Equations ===
A simple method of deriving the collisional velocity can be determined by taking the magnitudes of the original velocities and the escape velocity of the two bodies: $v_c = \sqrt{v_{esc}^2 + v_{\infty}^2}$

== Evidence and observations ==
Evidence for giant impacts is primarily derived from geological studies and isotopic analyses of planetary bodies.

=== Lunar evidence ===
The Moon, for instance, exhibits a unique composition that aligns with the giant impact hypothesis, particularly its identical isotopic ratios of oxygen to terrestrial material. Computer simulations have further substantiated this theory, demonstrating how such colossal collisions could lead to the Moon's formation from the debris generated by an impact with a Mars-sized body, dubbed Theia.According to this theory, Theia collided with the early Earth around 4.5 billion years ago, resulting in debris that eventually coalesced to form the Moon. While this hypothesis explains several lunar characteristics, it also faces challenges, such as accounting for an iron fraction in between that of Mars (13%) and Earth's mantle (18%).

=== Martian evidence ===
The Borealis Basin on Mars is a region of extreme flatness with a lack of craters. These attributes suggest formation on a short timescale, which could be explained by a single large impact. Such an impact would require an object 2-43% the mass of Mars.

=== Mercurian evidence ===
Mercury has a relatively large core compared to the other terrestrial planets. Its iron rich composition and large core are theorized to suggest that most of its mantle was stripped off in a high energy collision. Based on its proximity to the Sun, it and any objects it would have collided with would have large orbital speeds, enabling such a collision to have the velocities required for such a collision.

== Effects of giant impacts ==
Giant impacts have profound effects on the planets involved. They can lead to the formation of atmospheres and influence the chemical composition of planetary bodies. The collision can also alter a planet's rotation and axial tilt, potentially impacting climate and geological activity. For instance, the tilt of Uranus' axis has been suggested to result from such a significant impact.

== Implications for exoplanets ==
Understanding the giant impacts phase in the Solar System provides valuable insights into the formation of exoplanets. As astronomers discover more exoplanetary systems, the principles derived from giant impact studies can be applied to understand their characteristics and formation histories. Future research will likely focus on modeling impacts in diverse environments and the resulting evolutionary pathways of these distant worlds. Data from additional systems can also provide constraints for simulations of the Solar System when there are sufficient examples.
