= Eagle Station meteorite =

Meteorite found in the United States

Eagle Station
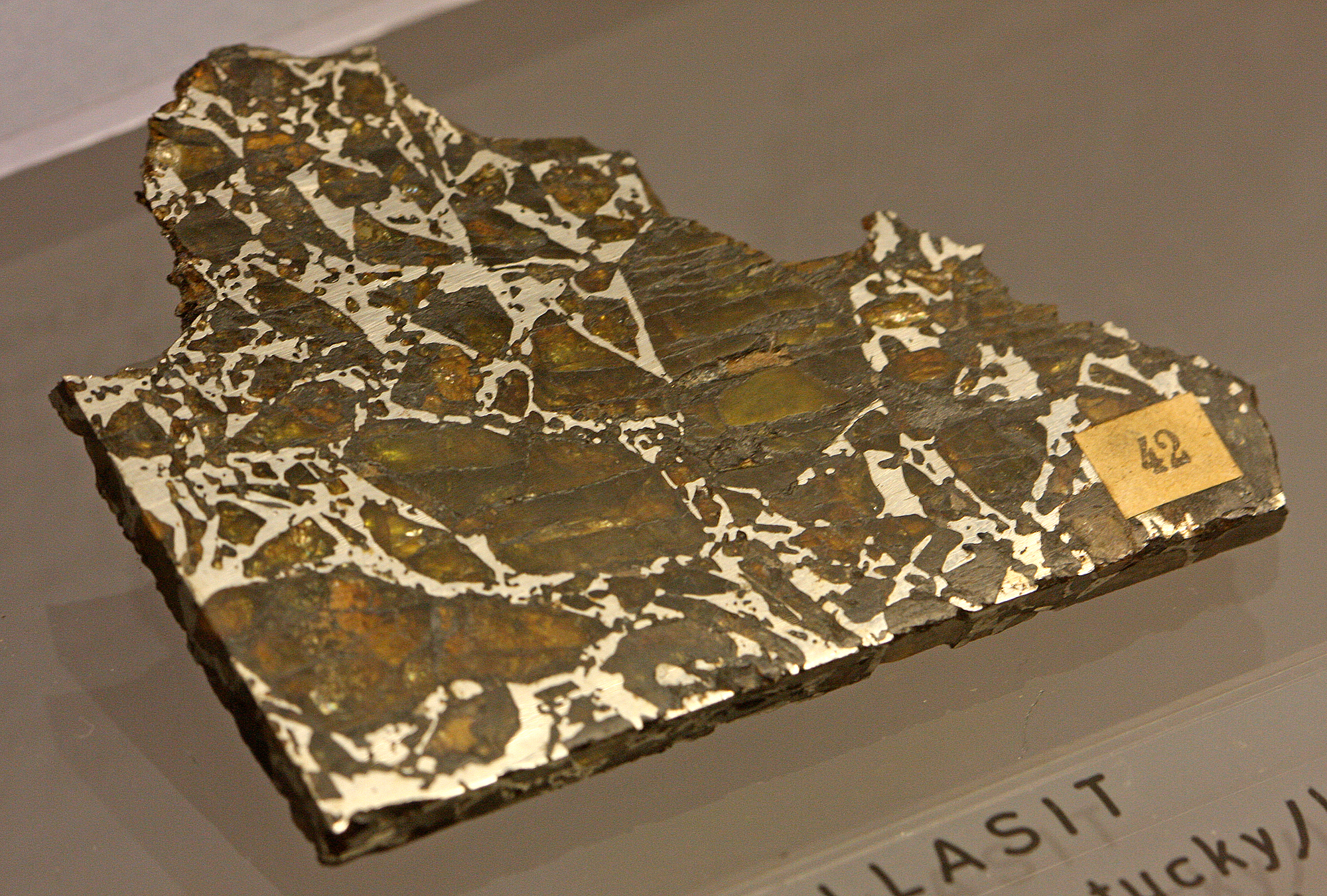
- Type: Achondrite, pallasite
- Group: PES (Eagle Station group)
- Country: United States
- Region: Kentucky
- Coordinates: 38°37′N 84°58′W
- Observed fall: No
- Found date: 1880
- TKW: 36 kg (79 lb)
- Related media on Wikimedia Commons

The Eagle Station meteorite is a pallasite and type specimen of the Eagle Station group.

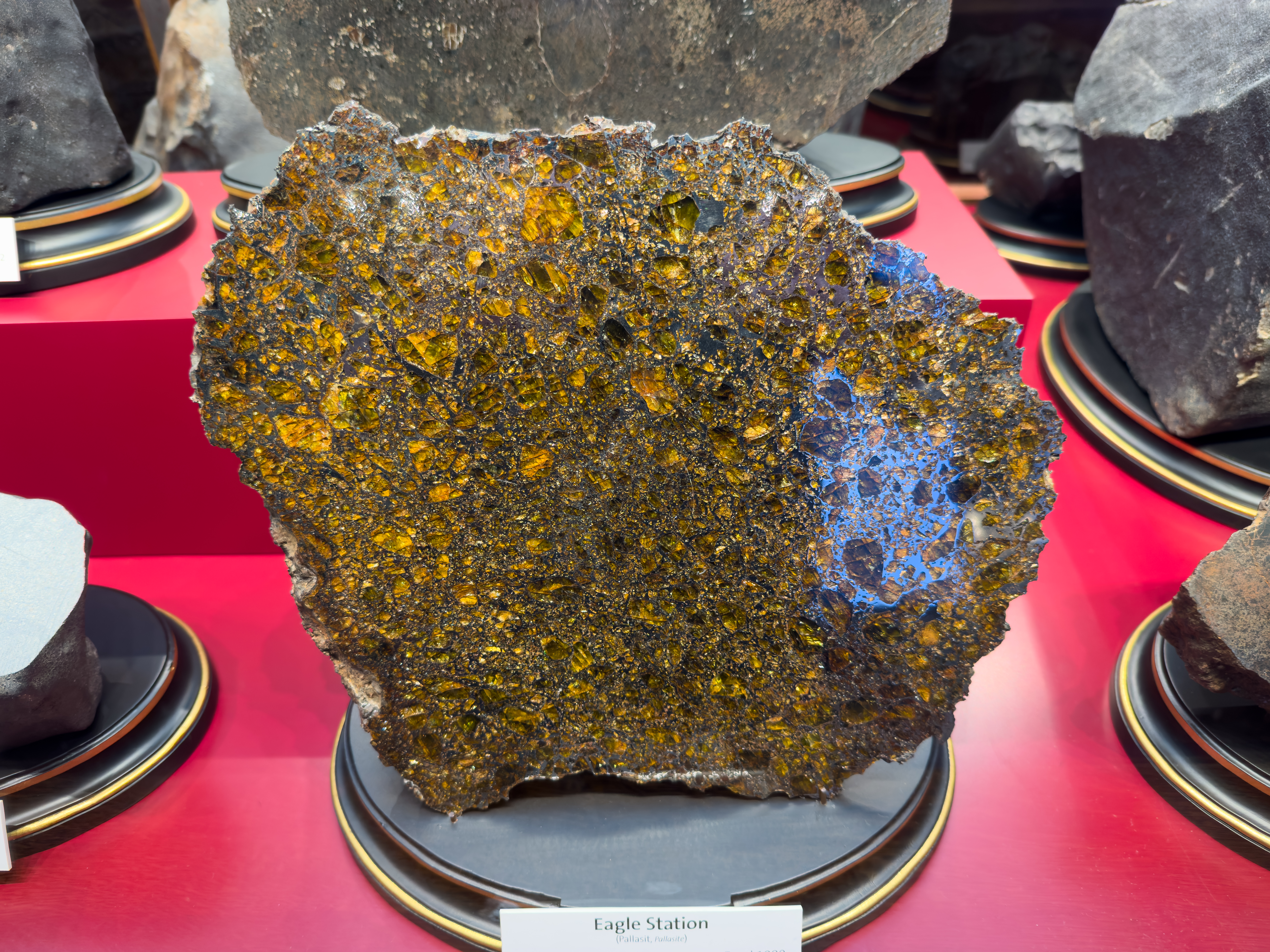
Part of the meteorite on display at Natural History Museum, Vienna

It was found in 1880 close to Eagle Station, Carroll County, Kentucky (United States). The first description was made by George F. Kunz in 1887.

== See also ==
- Glossary of meteoritics
