= Aileen Yingst =

American geologist

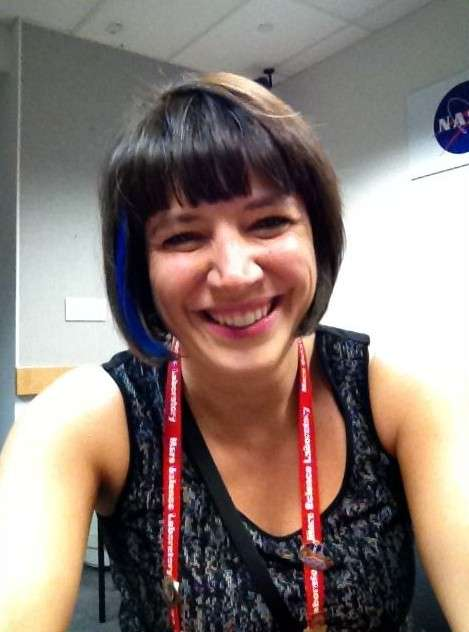
- Aileen Yingst, Investigator at NASA
- Citizenship: United States
- Education: Dartmouth College (BS); Brown University (MS and Ph.D.)
- Occupation: Geologist
- Title: Senior Scientist for the Planetary Science Institute
- Spouse: Ross Nova

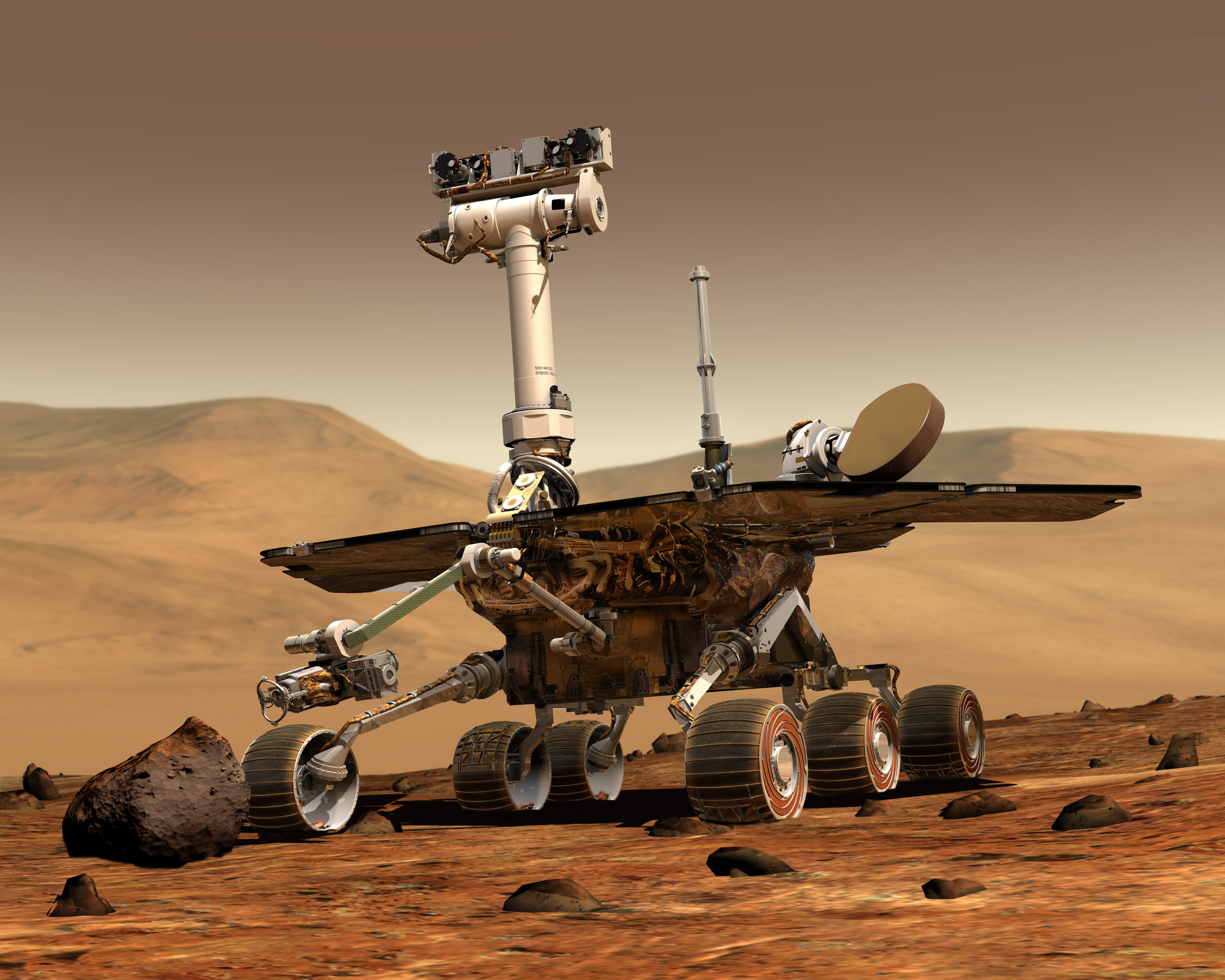
Artist's conception of MER rovers on Mars

R. Aileen Yingst is an American geologist and senior scientist for the Planetary Science Institute as well as an Investigator on the Perseverance rover's SHERLOC instrument for NASA. She has contributed to many projects including Mars Science Laboratory (MSL), Mars Exploration Rovers (Spirit and Opportunity), and Mars 2020, focusing mainly on macro/microtexture of surfaces on Mars.

== Education ==
Yingst attended Andrews Academy. She earned degrees in physics and astronomy from Dartmouth College and master and doctorate degrees in geological sciences from Brown University.

== Career ==
While in graduate school, Yingst was part of a team that received funding to work on NASA's Clementine lunar project. She also received individual NASA funding to study rock fragments.

Yingst became Director of the Wisconsin Space Grant Consortium in 2001. From 2002 to 2006, she held the roles of Secretary Treasurer, Vice-chair and Chair of the Planetary Division of the Geological Society of America. She was elected a Fellow of the Geological Society of America in 2015.

Yingst has served as Associate Principal Investigator on NASA's Mars Exploration Rover program.

As of June 6, 2019 R. Aileen Yingst became the Mars Exploration Program Analysis Group (MEPAG) Chair. The MEPAG is a scientific community-based group that helps to analyze and determine Mars exploration supporting NASA's interplanetary travel initiatives.

As of February 2021, she is Principal Investigator for the lunar Heimdall camera system, and Principal Investigator on the Mars Hand Lens Imager.

She is a geologist and senior scientist at the nonprofit Planetary Science Institute, an organization that partners with NASA.

Her research focuses on the texture of surfaces on Mars, the Moon and other planets.

== Personal life ==
Yingst resides in Brunswick, Maine. She is from Berrien Springs, Michigan. She is married to Ross Nova and together they have two children Joshua and Rebecca. Between 2018 and 2021 R. Aileen Yingst and her husband Ross Nova were donors supporting the Chamberlain Exterior Restoration for Joshua L. Chamberlain Museum.

== Honors and awards ==
- International Space Ops Award for Outstanding Achievement (2010)
- AIAA Haley Space Flight Award (2012)
- NASA Group Achievement Award for the MER 3rd and 4th, and 5th Extended Missions (2008, 2014)
- NASA Group Achievement Award for the Mars Science Laboratory MMM Camera Team (2013)
- NASA Group Achievement Award for the Prime Mission Science and Operations Team (2015)
- NASA Group Achievement Award for the Desert RATS Team (2011)
- National Space Club Distinguished Science Award (2015)
- NASA Distinguished Service Award (2014)
