= Planetary Science Institute =

Research institute in Tucson, Arizona

Coordinates: 32.2643°N 110.9464°W

- Logo of the Planetary Science Institute
- Abbreviation: PSI
- Formation: 1972
- Founders: William Kenneth Hartmann
- Type: Nonprofit 501(c)(3)
- Purpose: Planetary science
- Headquarters: Tucson, Arizona, United States
- Location: 1700 East Fort Lowell, Suite 106
- Official language: English
- Director: Mark V. Sykes
- Website: psi.edu

The Planetary Science Institute (PSI) is a 501(c)(3) non-profit research institute based in Tucson, Arizona, focusing on planetary science. As of 2025, its director and CEO is Dr. Amanda Hendrix. PSI, along with Space Science Institute (SSI) Southwest Research Institute (SwRI), and Eureka Scientific, were listed as 501(c)(3) organizations in the US in a special report by Nature in 2007, which facilitate federal grant applications of non-tenure-track astronomers.

== Description ==
Founded in 1972 by William Kenneth Hartmann, PSI is involved in many NASA missions, the study of Mars, asteroids, comets, interplanetary dust, the formation of the Solar System, extrasolar planets, the origin of life, and other scientific topics. It actively participated in the Dawn mission, which explored Vesta between 2011 and 2012, and Ceres between 2015 and 2018. It managed the GRaND a Gamma Ray and Neutron Detector spectrometer, which mapped the surfaces of the two minor planets to determine how they were formed and evolved.

PSI's orbit@home was a distributed computing project through which the public could help in the search for near-Earth objects. The institute is also involved in science education through school programs, popular science books and art.

From 2004 to 2025 the Mark V. Sykes served as director of PSI.

== Notable people ==
- Aileen Yingst, geologist and senior scientist for the Planetary Science Institute
- Pamela L. Gay, Senior Education and Communication Specialist and Senior Scientist

== See also ==
- Space Science Institute
- Space Studies Institute
- Southwest Research Institute
