= Mars 2020 =

Astrobiology Mars rover mission by NASA

- Self-portrait of Perseverance and Ingenuity (left) at Wright Brothers Field, 2021
- Mission type: Mars exploration
- Operator: NASA; JPL
- COSPAR ID: 2020-052A
- SATCAT no.: 45983
- Mission duration: Planned: 1 Mars year (668 sols, 687 Earth days); Perseverance: 5 years, 8 months and 22 days (since landing); Ingenuity: 2 years, 9 months and 22 days (final)

Spacecraft properties
- Manufacturer: JPL
- Launch mass: 4,060.5 kg (8,952 lb)

Start of mission
- Launch date: 30 July 2020, 11:50:00 UTC
- Rocket: Atlas V 541 (AV-088)
- Launch site: Cape Canaveral, SLC-41
- Contractor: United Launch Alliance

Mars rover
- Spacecraft component: Perseverance
- Landing date: 18 February 2021
- Landing site: Octavia E. Butler Landing, Jezero; 18.4447°N 77.4508°E
- Distance driven: 43.61 km (27.10 mi) as of 18 July 2026

Mars aircraft
- Spacecraft component: Ingenuity
- Landing date: 3 April 2021 (Deployed from Perseverance)
- Landing site: Helipad at Wright Brothers Field near Octavia E. Butler Landing, Jezero; 18.44486°N 77.45102°E
- Distance flown: 17.242 km (10.714 mi) in 72 flights
- NASA and JPL insignias (Perseverance) JPL mission insignia (Ingenuity) Large Strategic Science Missions; Planetary Science Division Mars Exploration Program

Mars 2020 is a NASA mission that includes the rover Perseverance, the now-grounded small robotic helicopter Ingenuity, and associated delivery systems, as part of the Mars Exploration Program. Mars 2020 was launched on an Atlas V rocket at 11:50:01 UTC on July 30, 2020, and landed in the Martian crater Jezero on February 18, 2021, with confirmation received at 20:55 UTC. On March 5, 2021, NASA named the landing site Octavia E. Butler Landing. As of 9 November 2026, Perseverance has been on Mars for 2033 sols (2090 total days; 5 years, 264 days). Ingenuity operated on Mars for 1042 sols (1071 total days; 2 years, 341 days) before sustaining serious damage to its rotor blades, possibly all four, causing NASA to retire the craft on January 25, 2024.

Perseverance is investigating an astrobiologically relevant ancient environment on Mars for its surface geological processes and history, and assessing its past habitability, the possibility of past life on Mars, and the potential for preservation of biosignatures within accessible geological materials. It will cache sample containers along its route for retrieval by a potential future Mars sample-return mission. The Mars 2020 mission was announced by NASA in December 2012 at the fall meeting of the American Geophysical Union in San Francisco. Perseverance's design is derived from the rover Curiosity, and it uses many components already fabricated and tested in addition to new scientific instruments and a core drill. The rover also employs nineteen cameras and two microphones, allowing for the audio recording of the Martian environment. On April 30, 2021, Perseverance became the first spacecraft to hear and record another spacecraft, the Ingenuity helicopter, on another planet.

The launch of Mars 2020 was the third of three space missions sent toward Mars during the July 2020 Mars launch window, with missions also launched by the national space agencies of the United Arab Emirates (the Emirates Mars Mission with the orbiter Hope on July 19, 2020) and China (the Tianwen-1 mission on July 23, 2020, with an orbiter, deployable and remote cameras, lander, and Zhurong rover).

== Conception ==
The Mars 2020 mission was announced by NASA on December 4, 2012, at the fall meeting of the American Geophysical Union in San Francisco. The selection of Mars as the target of NASA's flagship mission elicited surprise from some members of the scientific community. Some criticized NASA for continuing to focus on Mars exploration instead of other Solar System destinations in constrained budget times. Support came from California U.S. Representative Adam Schiff, who said he was interested in the possibility of advancing the launch date, which would enable a larger payload. Science educator Bill Nye endorsed the Mars sample-return role, saying this would be "extraordinarily fantastic and world-changing and worthy."

== Objectives ==
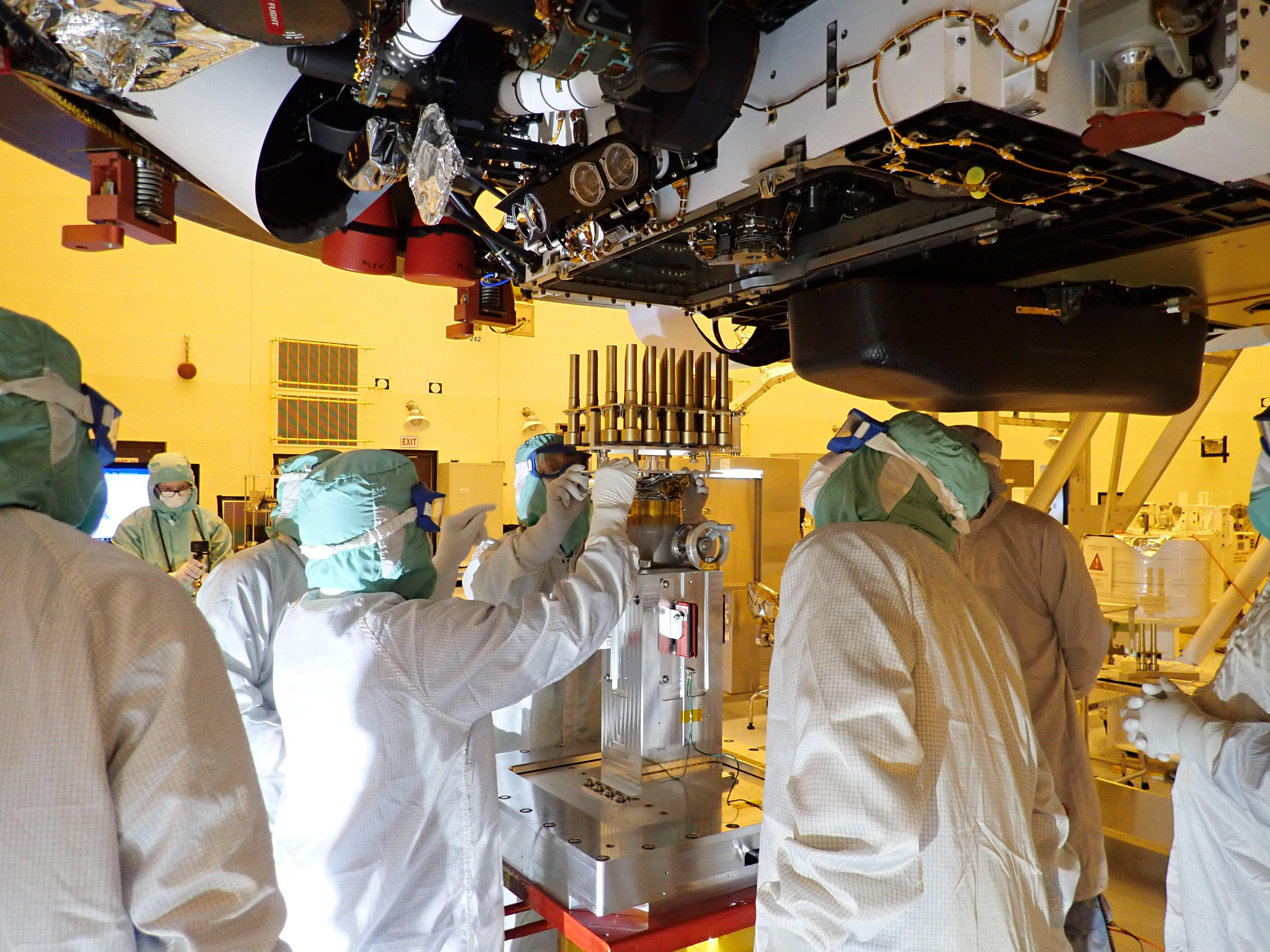
Sample tubes being loaded into the Perseverance rover

The mission is aimed at seeking signs of habitable conditions on Mars in the ancient past, and also at searching for evidence—or biosignatures—of past microbial life, and water. The mission was launched July 30, 2020, on an Atlas V-541, and the Jet Propulsion Laboratory manages the mission. The mission is part of NASA's Mars Exploration Program. The Science Definition Team proposed that the rover collect and package as many as 31 samples of rock cores and surface soil for a later mission to bring back for definitive analysis on Earth. In 2015, they expanded the concept, planning to collect even more samples and distribute the tubes in small piles or caches across the surface of Mars.

In September 2013, NASA launched an Announcement of Opportunity for researchers to propose and develop the instruments needed, including the Sample Caching System. The science instruments for the mission were selected in July 2014 after an open competition based on the scientific objectives set one year earlier. The science conducted by the rover's instruments will provide the context needed for detailed analyses of the returned samples. The chairman of the Science Definition Team stated that NASA does not presume that life ever existed on Mars, but given the recent Curiosity rover findings, past Martian life seems possible.

The Perseverance rover will explore a site likely to have been habitable. It will seek signs of past life, set aside a returnable cache with the most compelling rock core and soil samples, and demonstrate the technology needed for the future human and robotic exploration of Mars. A key mission requirement is that it must help prepare NASA for its long-term Mars sample-return mission and crewed mission efforts. The rover will make measurements and technology demonstrations to help designers of a future human expedition understand any hazards posed by Martian dust, and will test technology to produce a small amount of pure oxygen (O_{2}) from Martian atmospheric carbon dioxide (CO_{2}).

Improved precision landing technology that enhances the scientific value of robotic missions also will be critical for eventual human exploration on the surface. Based on input from the Science Definition Team, NASA defined the final objectives for the 2020 rover. Those became the basis for soliciting proposals to provide instruments for the rover's science payload in the spring of 2014. The mission will also attempt to identify subsurface water, improve landing techniques, and characterize weather, dust, and other potential environmental conditions that could affect future astronauts living and working on Mars.

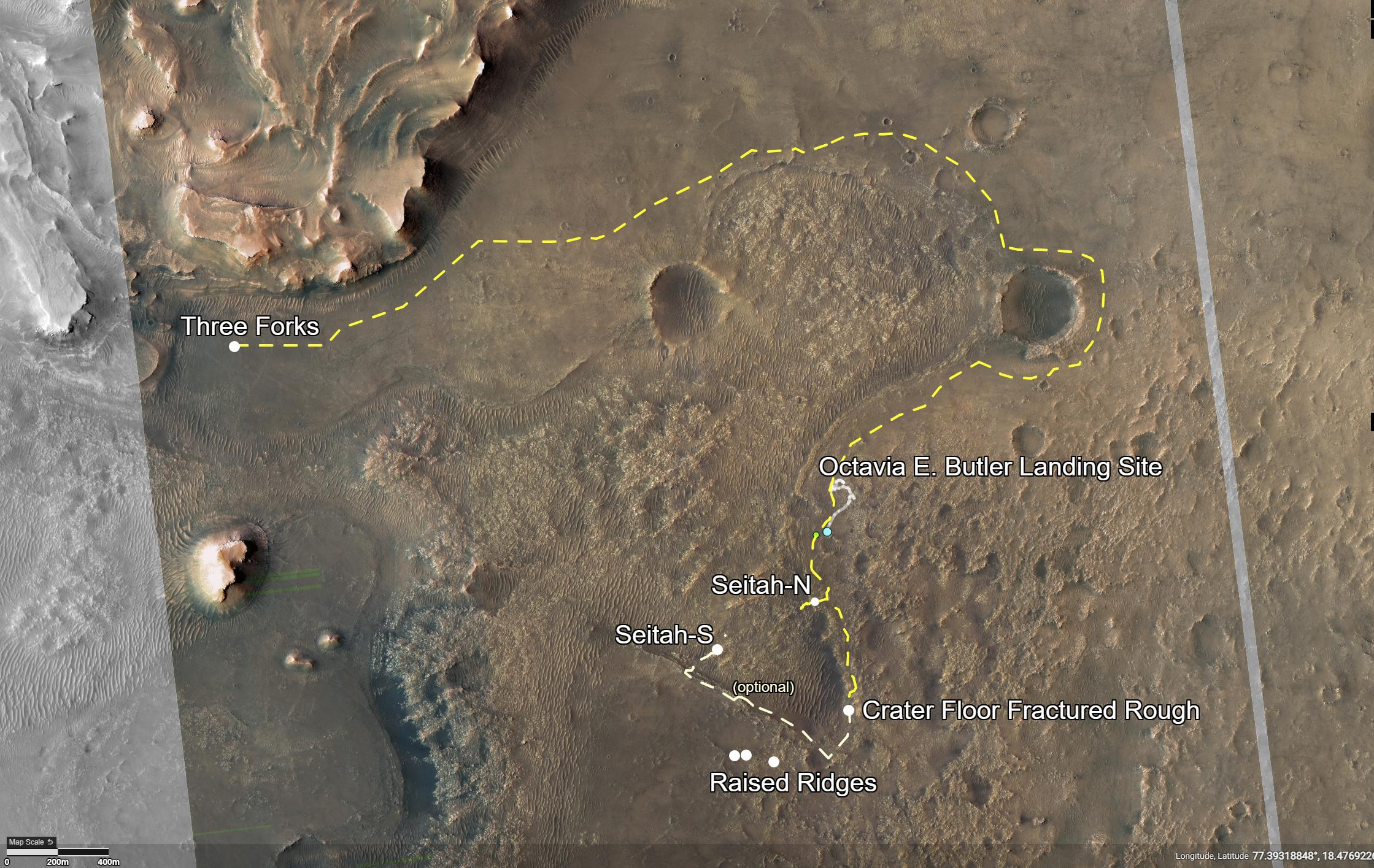
Campaign plans for 2021–2022

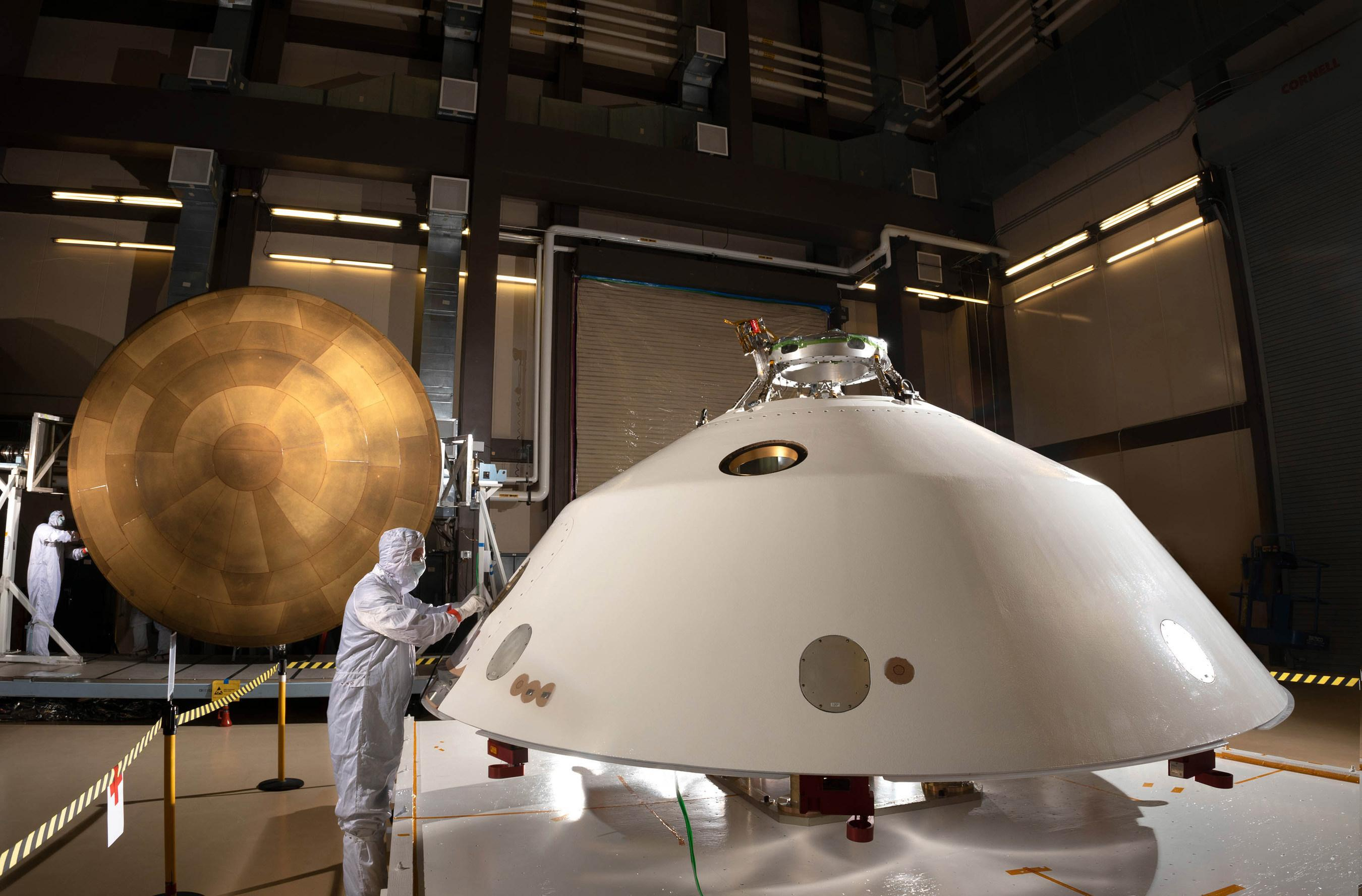
The heat shield (left) and back shell (right) together make up the aeroshell for NASA's Mars 2020 mission. The diameter of each part is about 15 feet (4.5 metres). The rover and its descent stage were enclosed and shielded by the aeroshell during their deep space voyage to Mars and upon entry into the Martian atmosphere, which generated intense heat. The aeroshell was made by Lockheed Martin Space in Denver, Colorado, where the photo was taken.

A key mission requirement for this rover is that it must help prepare NASA for its Mars sample-return mission (MSR) campaign, which is needed before any crewed mission takes place. Such effort would require three additional vehicles: an orbiter, a fetch rover, and a two-stage, solid-fueled Mars ascent vehicle (MAV). Between 20 and 30 drilled samples will be collected and cached inside small tubes by the Perseverance rover, and will be left on the surface of Mars for possible later retrieval by NASA in collaboration with ESA. A "fetch rover" would retrieve the sample caches and deliver them to a two-stage, solid-fueled Mars ascent vehicle (MAV). In July 2018, NASA contracted Airbus to produce a "fetch rover" concept study. The MAV would launch from Mars and enter a 500 km orbit and rendezvous with the Next Mars Orbiter or Earth Return Orbiter. The sample container would be transferred to an Earth entry vehicle (EEV) which would bring it to Earth, enter the atmosphere under a parachute and hard-land for retrieval and analyses in specially designed safe laboratories.

In the first science campaign Perseverance performs an arching drive southward from its landing site to the Séítah unit to perform a "toe dip" into the unit to collect remote-sensing measurements of geologic targets. After that she will return to the Crater Floor Fractured Rough to collect the first core sample there. Passing by the Octavia B. Butler landing site concludes the first science campaign.

The second campaign shall start with several months of travel towards the "Three Forks" where Perseverance can access geologic locations at the base of the ancient delta of Neretva river, as well as ascend the delta by driving up a valley wall to the northwest.

=== Results ===
The scientific results, as of 2025, are as follows. According to NASA, the mission has made "discoveries about the volcanic history, habitability, and role of water in Jezero Crater." Specifically, they reported that instead of all the rocks in Jezero crater being sedimentary, being "transported into the crater by wind or water," "several types of igneous rock" were discovered, which "showed evidence of interaction with water." Additionally,

At a rock named "Wildcat Ridge" located within Jezero's well-preserved sedimentary fan deposit, Perseverance found evidence for an ancient lake environment. Not only were these sediments likely deposited in a standing body of water, but they also continued to interact with water long after they were formed. The environments recorded within the rocks at Wildcat Ridge would have been habitable for ancient microbial life, and this type of rock is ideal for preserving possible signs of ancient life.

They also found that "sediments entering Jezero's lake were deposited in a delta" and "evidence for late-stage, high-energy flooding that carried large boulders into the crater." The MOXIE experiment produced 122 grams of oxygen from carbon dioxide. The microphone studies showed that the speed of sound is slower and the volumes of sounds transmitted through the atmosphere is lower, than on Earth. PIXL found that the Seitah formation and a rock at "Otis Peak" contained olivine, phosphates, sulfates, clays, carbonate minerals, silicate minerals, "augite pyroxene, feldspathic mesostasis, various Fe,Cr,Ti-spinels, and merrillite", perchlorate, feldspar, magnesite, siderite, oxides, as well as minerals with composition including magnesium, iron, chlorine, and sodium. SHERLOC revealed findings of high concentrations of macromolecules filled with carbon on the Cheyava Falls and Apollo Temple rocks, though it was incapable of determining whether they were of biotic origin or not. RIMFAX revealed findings "consistent with a subsurface dominated by solid rock and mafic material" and that "the crater floor experienced a period of erosion before the deposition of the overlying delta strata. The regularity and horizontality of the basal delta sediments observed in the radar cross sections indicate that they were deposited in a low-energy lake environment."

== Spacecraft ==
=== Cruise stage and EDLS ===
Animation of Mars 2020's trajectory from 30 July 2020 to 20 February 2021: Mars 2020; Sun; Earth; Mars

The three major components of the Mars 2020 spacecraft are the 539 kg (1,188 lb) cruise stage for travel between Earth and Mars; the Entry, Descent, and Landing System (EDLS) that includes the 575 kg (1,268 lb) aeroshell descent vehicle + 440 kg (970 lb) heat shield; and the 1,070 kg (2,360 lb) (fueled mass) descent stage needed to deliver Perseverance and Ingenuity safely to the Martian surface. The Descent Stage carries 400 kg (880 lb) landing propellant for the final soft landing burn after being slowed down by a 21.5 m (71 ft)-wide, 81 kg (179 lb) parachute. The 1,025 kg (2,260 lb) rover is based on the design of Curiosity. While there are differences in scientific instruments and the engineering required to support them, the entire landing system (including the descent stage and heat shield) and rover chassis could essentially be recreated without any additional engineering or research. This reduces overall technical risk for the mission, while saving funds and time on development.

One of the upgrades is a guidance and control technique called "Terrain Relative Navigation" (TRN) to fine-tune steering in the final moments of landing. This system allowed for a landing inside 7.7 km × 6.6 km (4.8 mi × 4.1 mi) wide ellipse with a positioning error within 40 m (130 ft) and avoided obstacles. This is a marked improvement from the Mars Science Laboratory mission that had an elliptical area of 7 by 20 km (4.3 by 12.4 mi). In October 2016, NASA reported using the Xombie rocket to test the Lander Vision System (LVS), as part of the Autonomous Descent and Ascent Powered-flight Testbed (ADAPT) experimental technologies, for the Mars 2020 mission landing, meant to increase the landing accuracy and avoid obstacle hazards.

== Perseverance rover ==
Spacecraft of Mars 2020

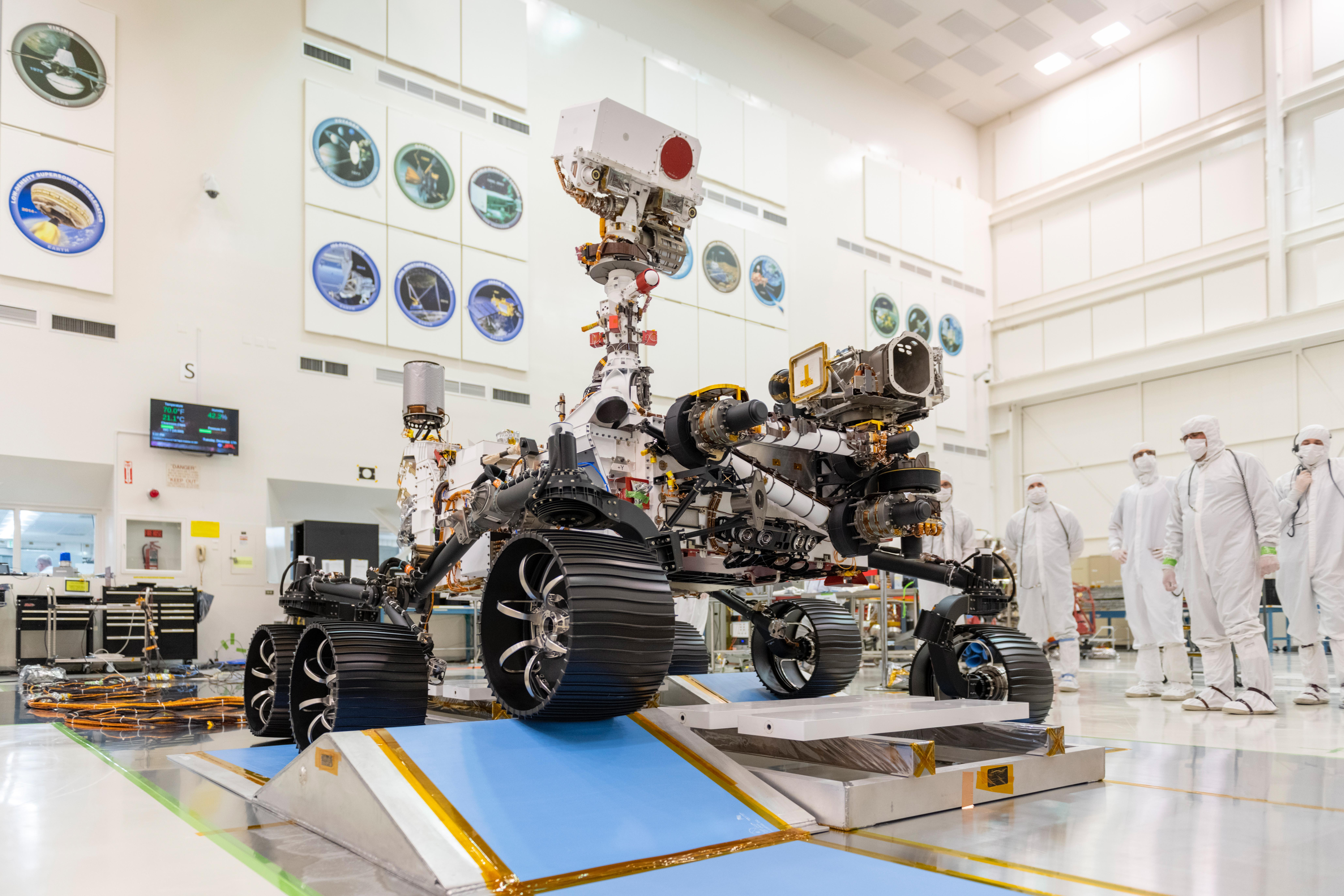
Perseverance rover at JPL

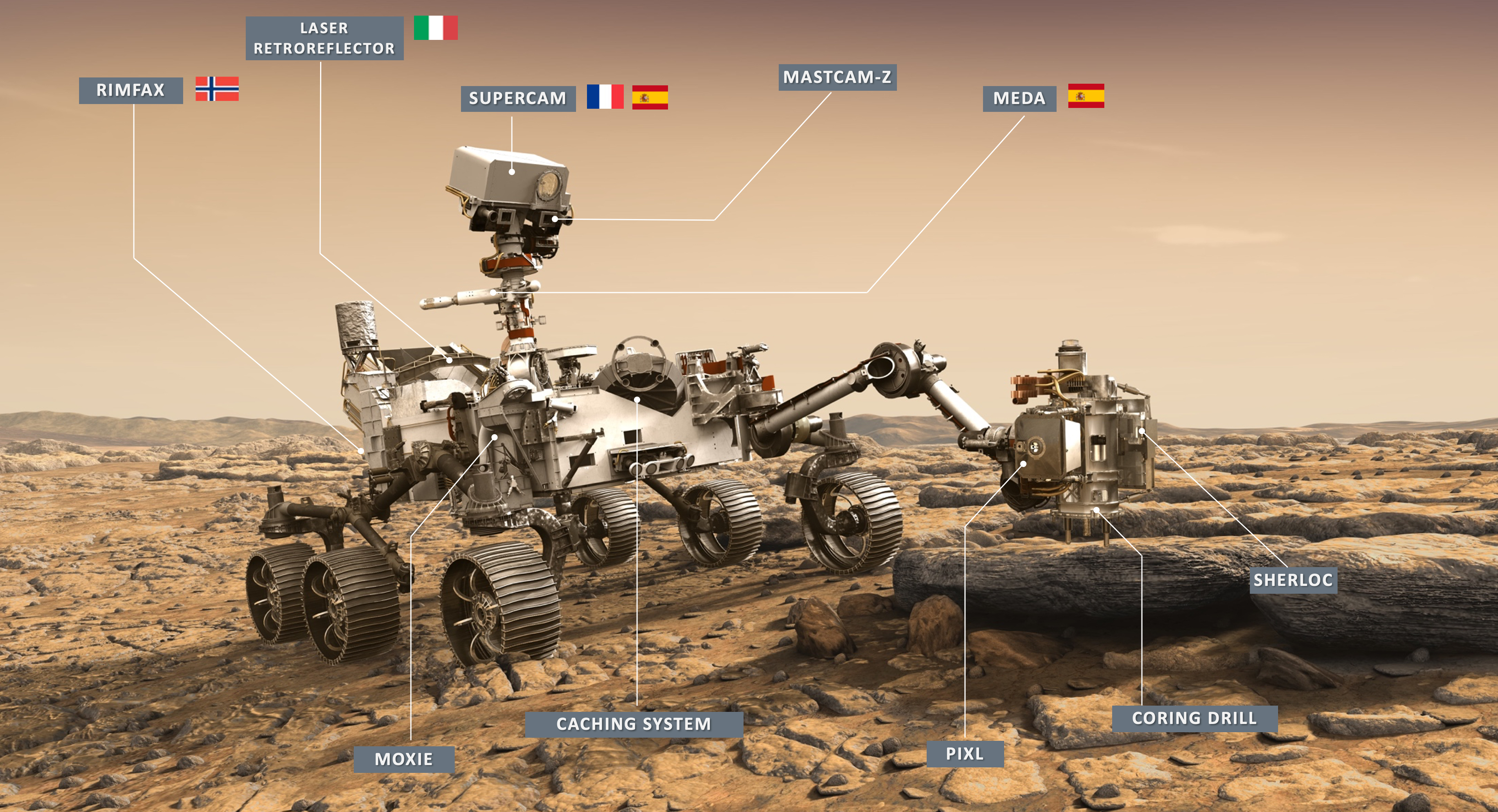
Seven scientific instruments aboard Perseverance

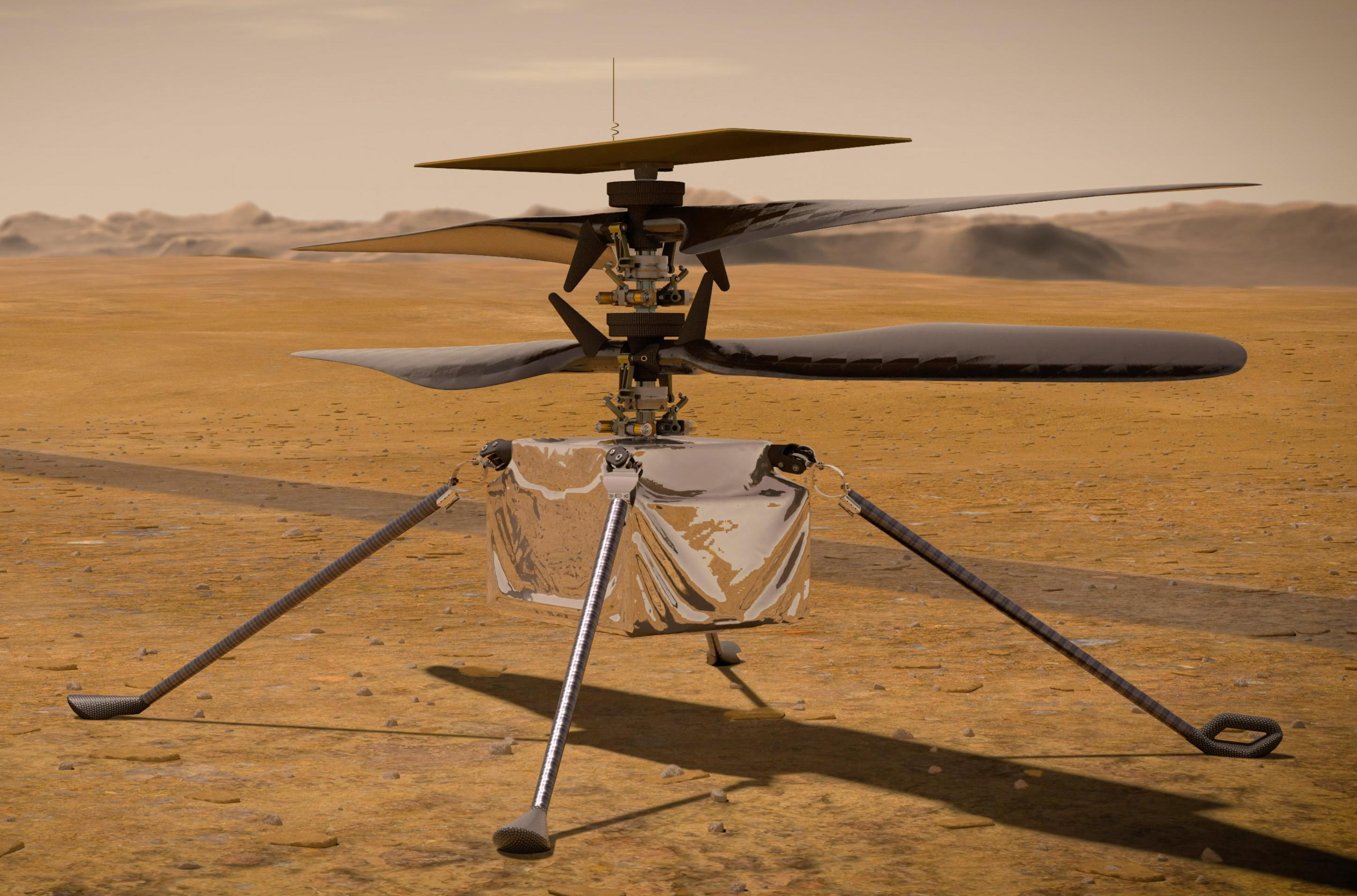
Ingenuity helicopter

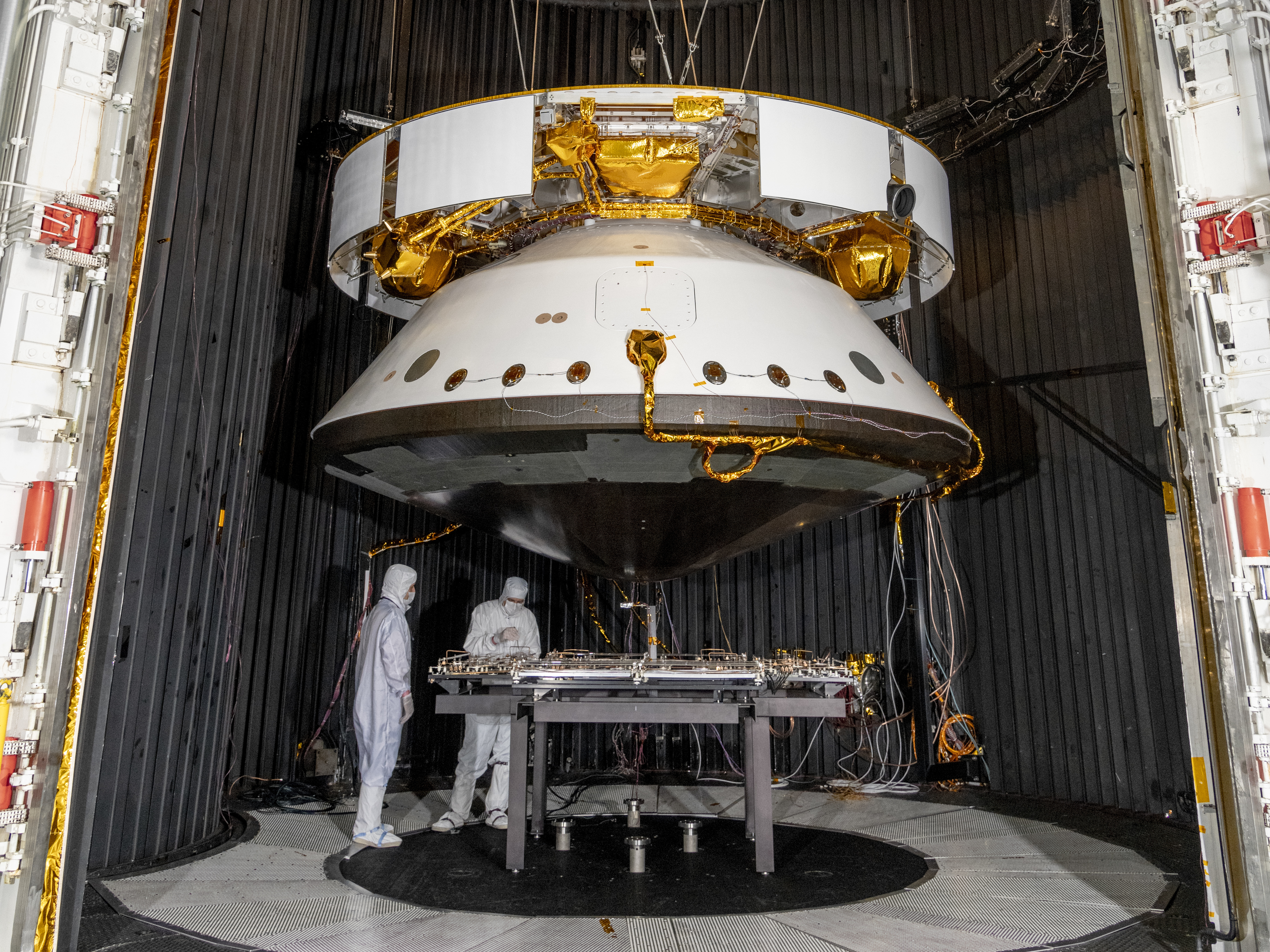
The cruise stage and EDLS carried both spacecraft to Mars.

Perseverance was designed with help from Curiosity's engineering team, as both are quite similar and share common hardware. Engineers redesigned Perseverance's wheels to be more robust than Curiosity's, which, after kilometres of driving on the Martian surface, have shown progressed deterioration. Perseverance will have thicker, more durable aluminium wheels, with reduced width and a greater diameter, 52.5 cm (20.7 in), than Curiosity's 50 cm (20 in) wheels. The aluminium wheels are covered with cleats for traction and curved titanium spokes for springy support. The combination of the larger instrument suite, new Sampling and Caching System, and modified wheels makes Perseverance 14 percent heavier than Curiosity, at 1,025 kg (2,260 lb) and 899 kg (1,982 lb), respectively. The rover will include a five-jointed robotic arm measuring 2.1 m (6 ft 11 in) long. The arm will be used in combination with a turret to analyze geologic samples from the Martian surface.

A Multi-Mission Radioisotope Thermoelectric Generator (MMRTG), left over as a backup part for Curiosity during its construction, was integrated onto the rover to supply electrical power. The generator has a mass of 45 kg (99 lb) and contains 4.8 kg (11 lb) of plutonium dioxide as the source of steady supply of heat that is converted to electricity. The electrical power generated is approximately 110 watts at launch with little decrease over the mission time.

Two lithium-ion rechargeable batteries are included to meet peak demands of rover activities when the demand temporarily exceeds the MMRTG's steady electrical output levels. The MMRTG offers a 14-year operational lifetime, and it was provided to NASA by the United States Department of Energy. Unlike solar panels, the MMRTG does not rely on the presence of the Sun for power, providing engineers with significant flexibility in operating the rover's instruments even at night and during dust storms, and through the winter season.

The Norwegian-developed radar RIMFAX is one of the seven instruments that have been placed on board. The radar has been developed together with FFI (Norwegian Defence Research Establishment), led by Principal Investigator Svein-Erik Hamran of FFI, the Norwegian Space Center, and a number of Norwegian companies. Space has also been found for the first time for an uncrewed helicopter, which will be controlled by NTNU (Norwegian University of Science and Technology) trained cybernetics engineer Håvard Fjær Grip and his team at NASA's Jet Propulsion Laboratory in Los Angeles.

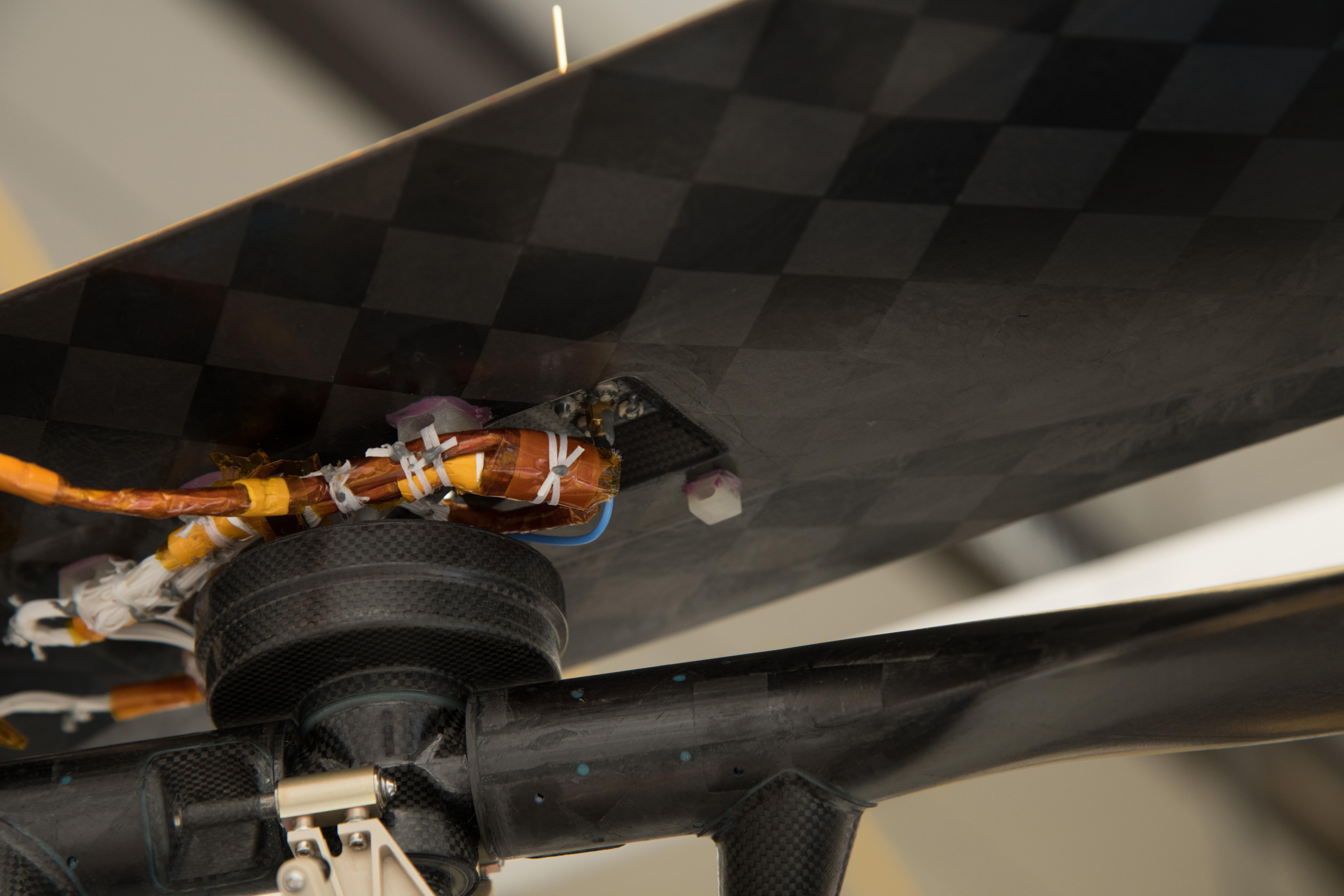
A piece of fabric from the wing of the 1903 Wright Flyer airplane of the Wright brothers is attached under the solar panel of the Ingenuity helicopter.

=== Ingenuity helicopter ===
Ingenuity was the robotic coaxial helicopter that made the first aircraft flights on another planet. It was deployed from the underside of Perseverance and used autonomous control guided by flight plan instructions uploaded from mission control.

After each landing, it transmitted photographs and other data to Perseverance, which relayed the information to Earth. The program was originally designed to perform only five hops, but the helicopter flew 72 times over three years until NASA ended its mission on January 25, 2024. NASA has plans to build on the helicopter's design for future Mars missions.

== Mission ==
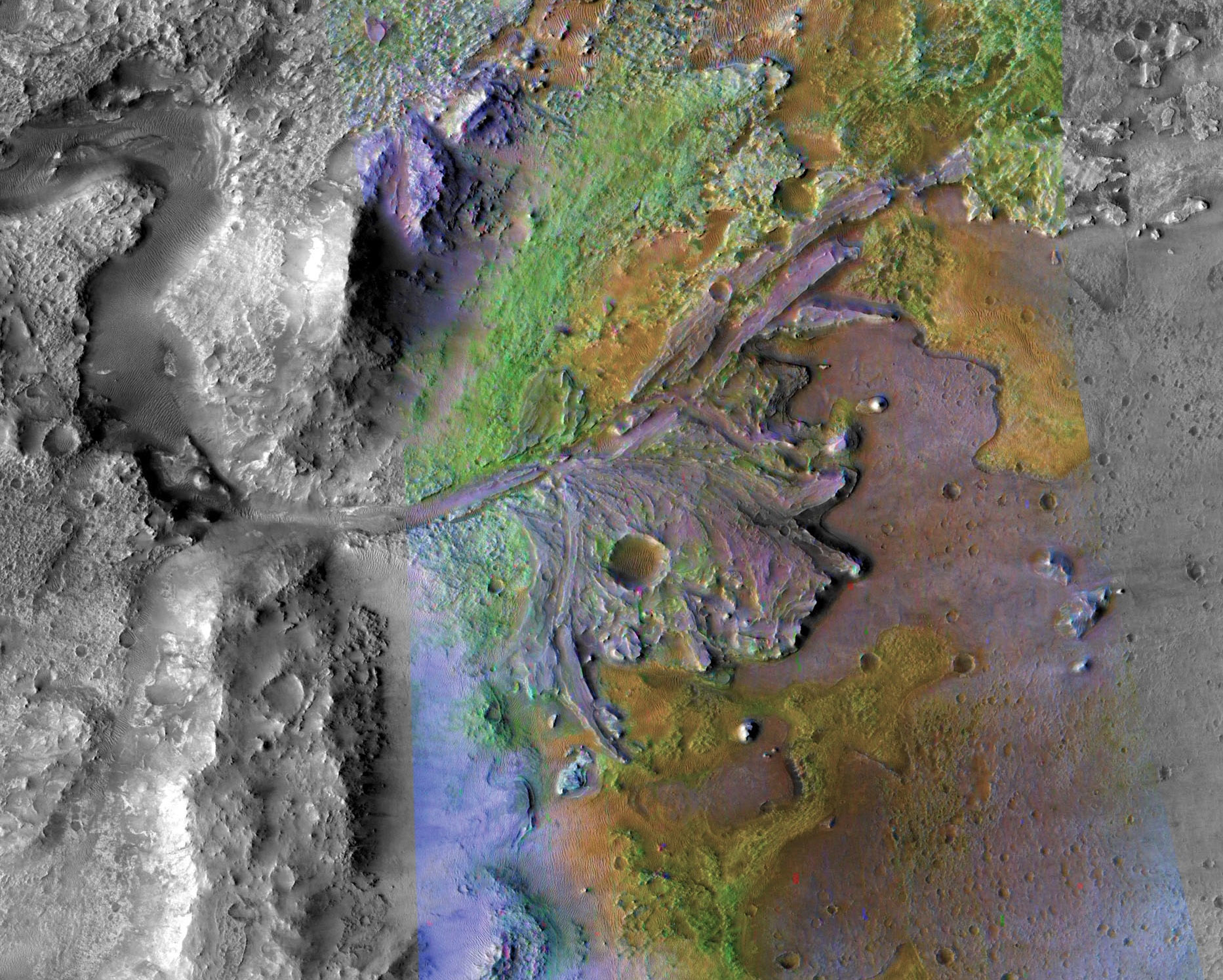
The Jezero crater delta on Mars, where the Perseverance rover and Ingenuity helicopter landed. Clays are visible as green in this false color CRISM / CTX image.

Jezero Crater Formation by asteroid impact

The mission is centered around exploring Jezero crater, which scientists speculate was a 250 m (820 ft) deep lake about 3.9 billion to 3.5 billion years ago. Jezero today features a prominent river delta where water flowing through it deposited much sediment over the eons, which is "extremely good at preserving biosignatures". The sediments in the delta likely include carbonates and hydrated silica, known to preserve microscopic fossils on Earth for billions of years. Prior to the selection of Jezero, eight proposed landing sites for the mission were under consideration by September 2015; Columbia Hills in Gusev crater, Eberswalde crater, Holden crater, Jezero crater, Mawrth Vallis, Northeastern Syrtis Major Planum, Nili Fossae, and Southwestern Melas Chasma.

A workshop was held on February 8–10, 2017, in Pasadena, California, to discuss these sites, with the goal of narrowing down the list to three sites for further consideration. The three sites chosen were Jezero crater, Northeastern Syrtis Major Planum, and Columbia Hills. Jezero crater was ultimately selected as the landing site in November 2018. The "fetch rover" for returning the samples is expected to launch in 2026. The landing and surface operations of the "fetch rover" would take place early in 2029. The earliest return to Earth is envisaged for 2031.

== Launch and cruise ==
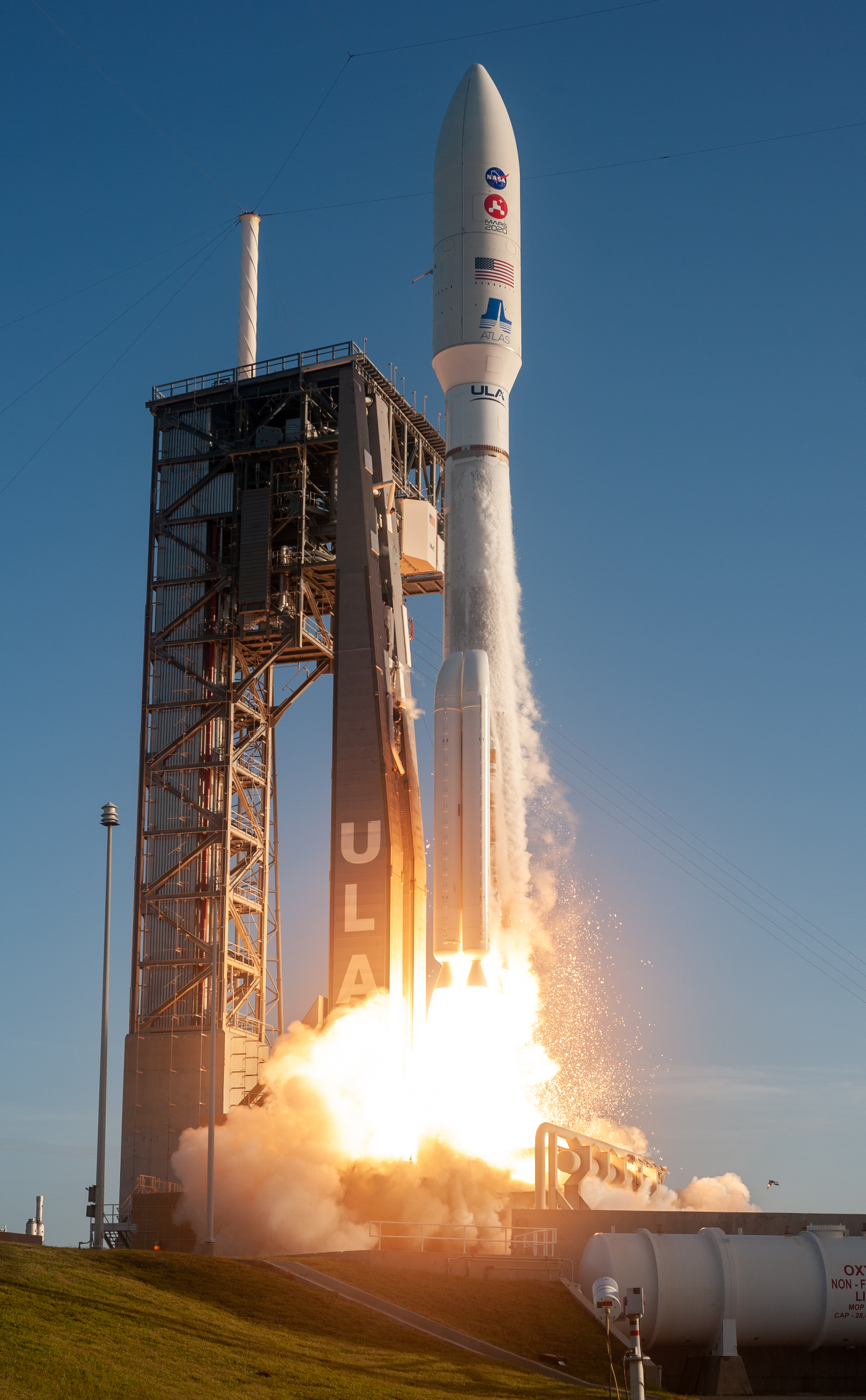
Mars 2020 launching from Cape Canaveral Space Force Station, Florida, at 11:50 UTC on 30 July 2020

The launch window, when the positions of Earth and Mars were optimal for traveling to Mars, opened on July 17, 2020 and lasted through August 15, 2020. The rocket was launched on July 30, 2020, at 11:50 UTC, and the rover landed on Mars on February 18, 2021, at 20:55 UTC, with a planned surface mission of at least one Mars year (668 sols or 687 Earth days).

Two other missions to Mars were launched in this window: the United Arab Emirates Space Agency launched its Emirates Mars Mission with the Hope orbiter on July 20, 2020, which arrived in Mars orbit on February 8, 2021, and China National Space Administration launched Tianwen-1 on July 23, 2020, arriving in orbit on February 10, 2021, and successfully soft landed with the Zhurong rover on May 14, 2021.

NASA announced that all of the trajectory correction maneuvers (TCM) were a success. The spacecraft fired thrusters to adjust its course toward Mars, shifting the probe's initial post-launch aim point onto the Red Planet.

== Entry, descent, and landing (EDL) ==
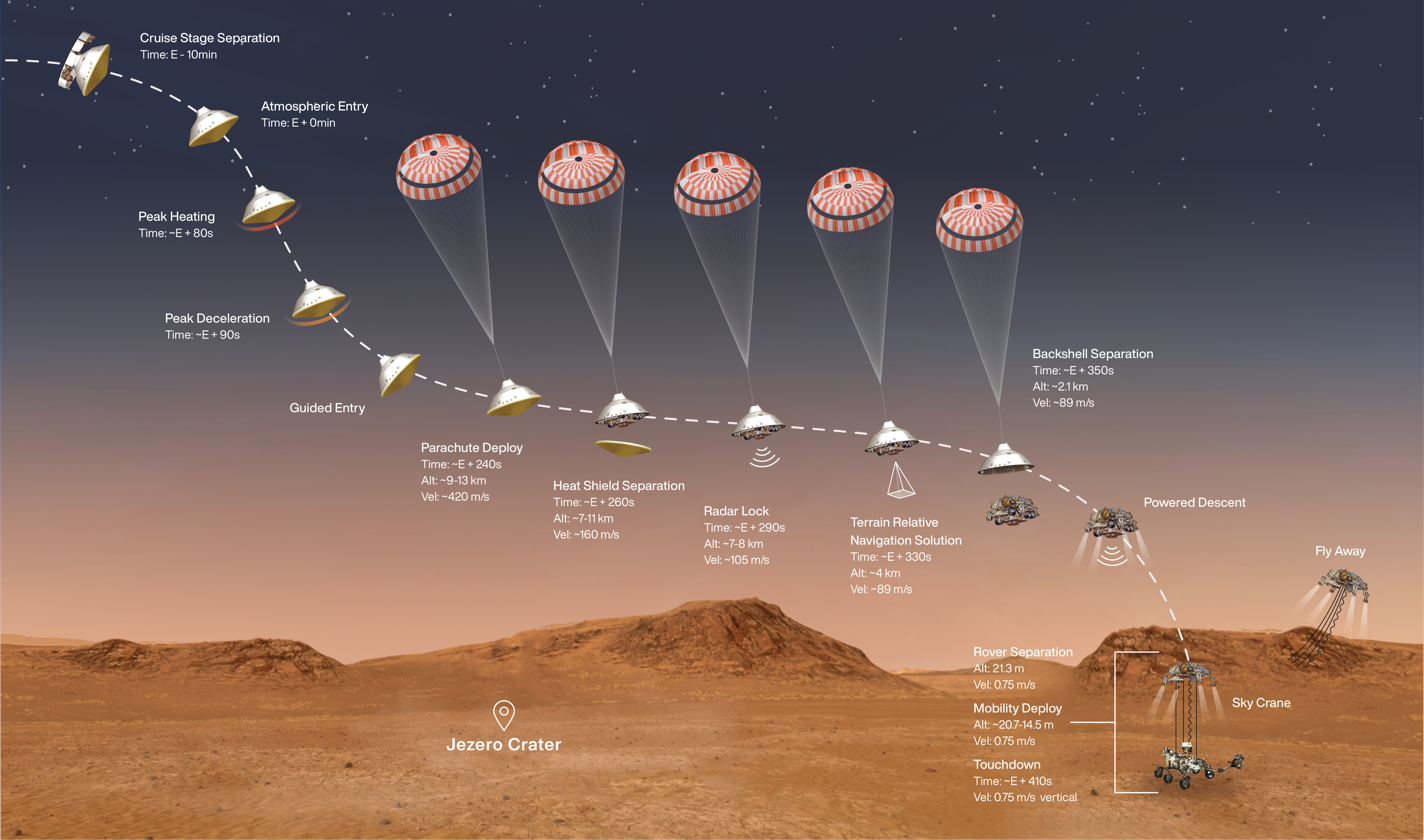
Diagram of the various stages of the EDL process for Perseverance

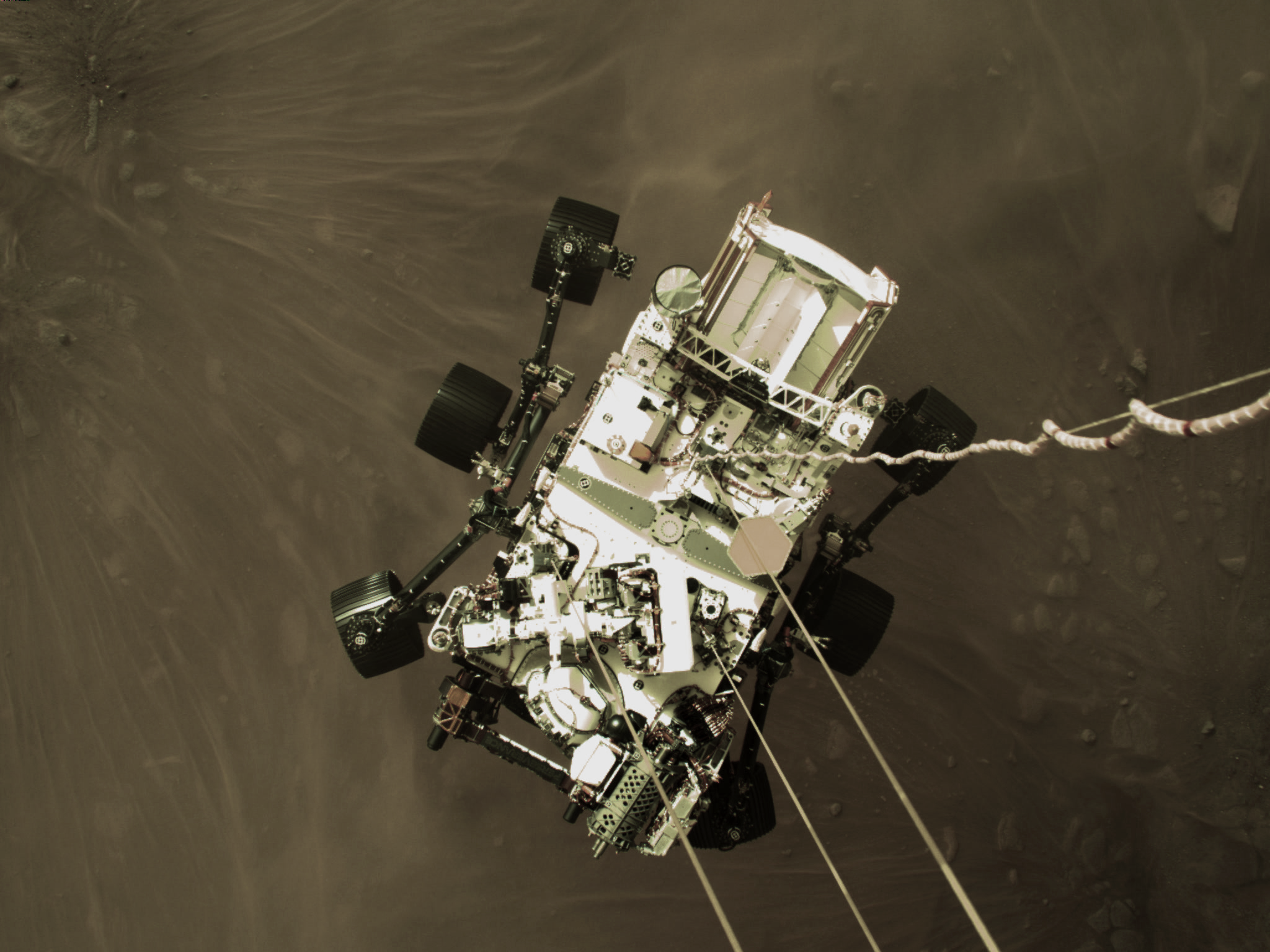
The rover photographed from the sky crane during descent

Prior to landing, the Science Team from an earlier NASA lander, InSight, announced that they would attempt to detect the entry, descent and landing (EDL) sequence of the Mars 2020 mission using InSight's seismometers. Despite being more than 3,400 km (2,100 mi) away from the Mars landing site, the team indicated that there was a possibility that InSight's instruments would be sensitive enough to detect the hypersonic impact of Mars 2020's cruise mass balance devices with the Martian surface.

The rover's landing was planned similar to the Mars Science Laboratory used to deploy Curiosity on Mars in 2012. The craft from Earth was a carbon fiber capsule that protected the rover and other equipment from heat during entry into the Mars atmosphere and initial guidance towards the planned landing site. Once through, the craft jettisoned the lower heat shield and deployed a parachute from the backshell to slow the descent to a controlled speed. With the craft moving under 320 km/h (200 mph) and about 1.9 km (1.2 mi) from the surface, the rover and sky crane assembly detached from the backshell, and rockets on the sky crane controlled the remaining descent to the planet. As the sky crane moved closer to the surface, it lowered Perseverance via cables until it confirmed touchdown, detached the cables, and flew a distance away to avoid damaging the rover.

Perseverance recording of the ambient noise on Mars, modified to remove the background sounds of the rover

Perseverance successfully landed on the surface of Mars with help of the sky crane on February 18, 2021, at 20:55 UTC, to begin its science phase, and began sending images back to Earth. Ingenuity reported back to NASA via the communications systems on Perseverance the following day, confirming its status. The helicopter was not expected to be deployed for at least 60 days into the mission. NASA also confirmed that the on-board microphone on Perseverance had survived entry, descent and landing (EDL), along with other high-end visual recording devices, and released the first audio recorded on the surface of Mars shortly after landing, capturing the sound of a Martian breeze as well as a hum from the rover itself. On May 7, 2021, NASA confirmed that Perseverance managed to record both audio and video from Ingenuity's fourth flight which took place on April 30, 2021.

== Major mission milestones and works ==
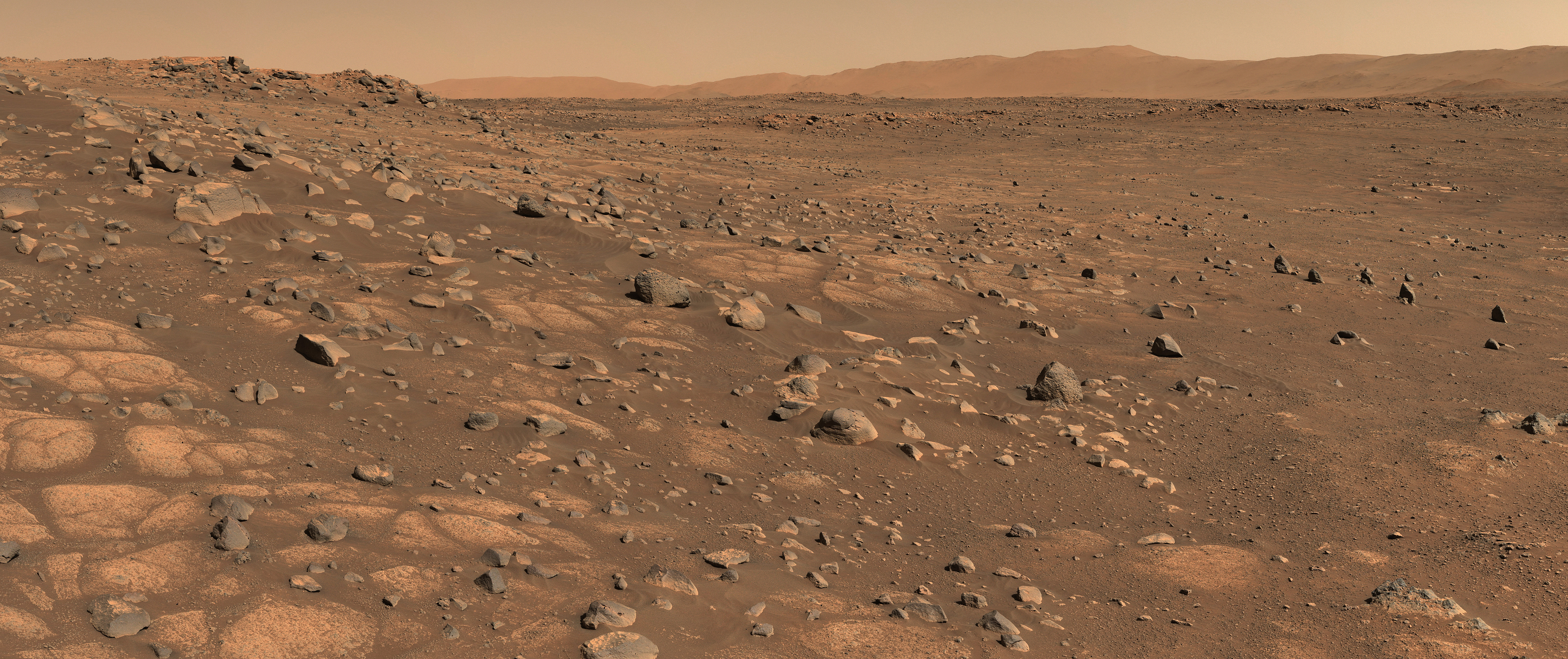
"Crater Floor Fractured Rough" is the area from which the first rock sample shall be collected.

- February 18, 2021 – Landing of Perseverance on Mars surface
- March 4, 2021 – First major test of Perseverance drive functions
- April 3, 2021 – Deployment of Ingenuity
- April 3–4, 2021 – Mars Environmental Dynamics Analyzer (MEDA) recorded the first weather report on Mars
- April 19, 2021 – First flight of Ingenuity
- April 20, 2021 – Mars Oxygen ISRU Experiment (MOXIE) generated 5.37 g (0.189 oz) of oxygen gas from carbon dioxide on its first test on Mars.
- June 1, 2021 – Perseverance begins its first science campaign.
- June 8, 2021 – Seventh flight of Ingenuity.
- June 21, 2021 – Eighth flight of Ingenuity. The "watchdog issue", a recurring issue which occasionally prevented Ingenuity from taking flight, is fixed.
- July 5, 2021 – Ninth flight of Ingenuity. This flight is the first to explore areas only an aerial vehicle can, by taking a shortcut over the Séítah unit. The sandy ripples of the Séítah unit would prove too difficult for Perseverance to travel through directly.
- August 6, 2021 – Perseverance acquired its first sample from the ancient lakebed.
- May 3, 2022 – After 27 flights of Ingenuity, the rover lost contact with the helicopter. By suspending scientific operations on the rover to listen for signals from the helicopter, NASA was able to regain contact and resume flights.
- January 25, 2024 – NASA announces end of mission for Ingenuity. Engineers determined that the helicopter sustained damage after a communications blackout with Perseverance just before the landing of flight 72. Photos taken by Ingenuity showed that its rotor blades, possibly all four, were damaged, resulting in the decision not to fly again. The helicopter had been struggling to fly for several missions before this, due to deterioration of onboard navigation systems. The Ingenuity Team have named the final landing spot and resting place of Ingenuity in Airfield Chi (χ) as "Valinor Hills", after the fictional location in J.R.R. Tolkien's fantasy novels.
- July 25, 2024 - NASA's Perseverance rover discovered "leopard spots" on a reddish rock nicknamed "Cheyava Falls" in Mars' Jezero Crater, that has some indications it may have hosted microbial life billions of years ago, but further research is needed.

== Gallery ==
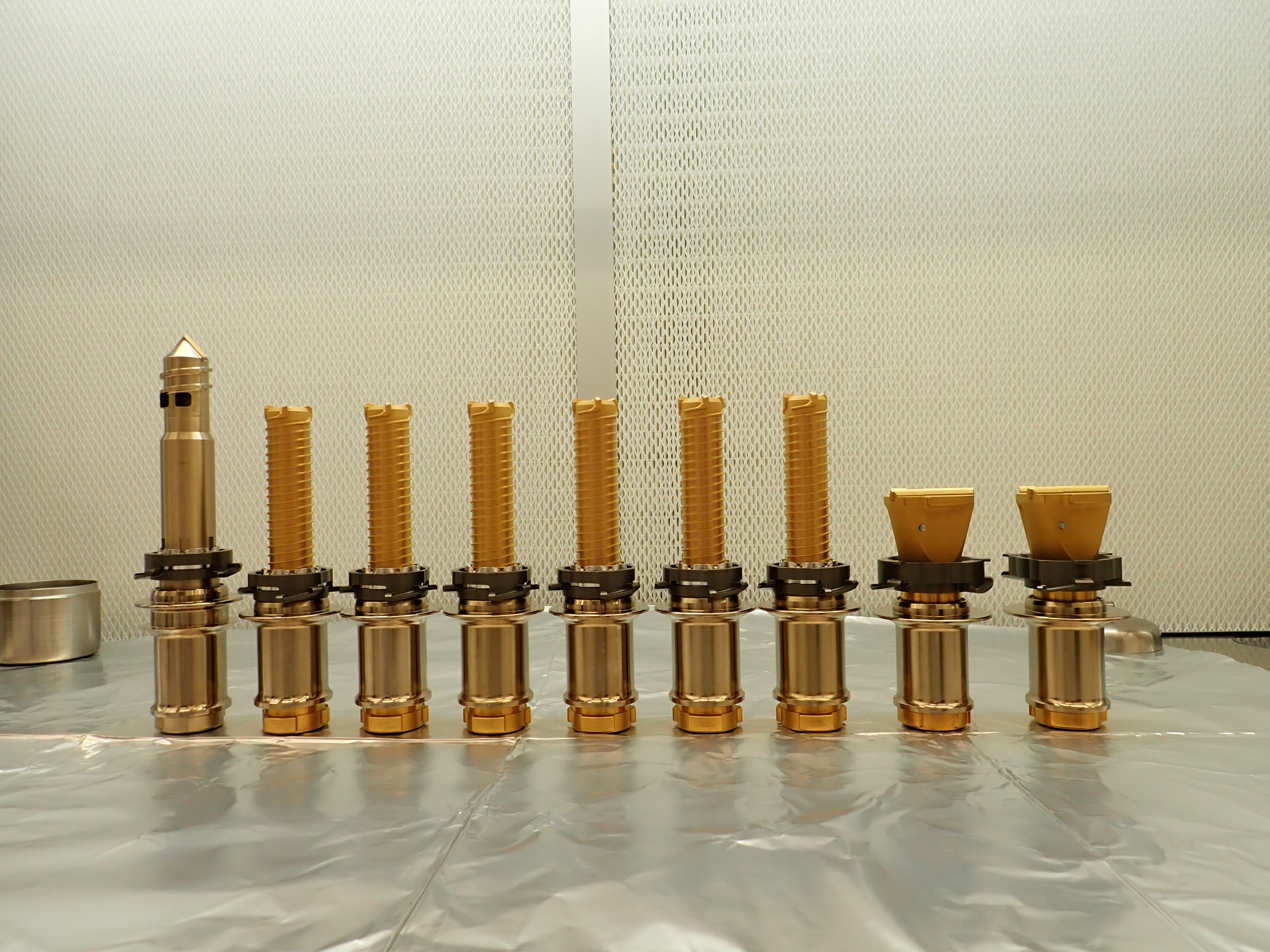
Perseverance rover's sampling bits: The pointed one with two windows on the left is the regolith drill; the two shorter ones on the right are abrasion tools; the others in the center are rock drills

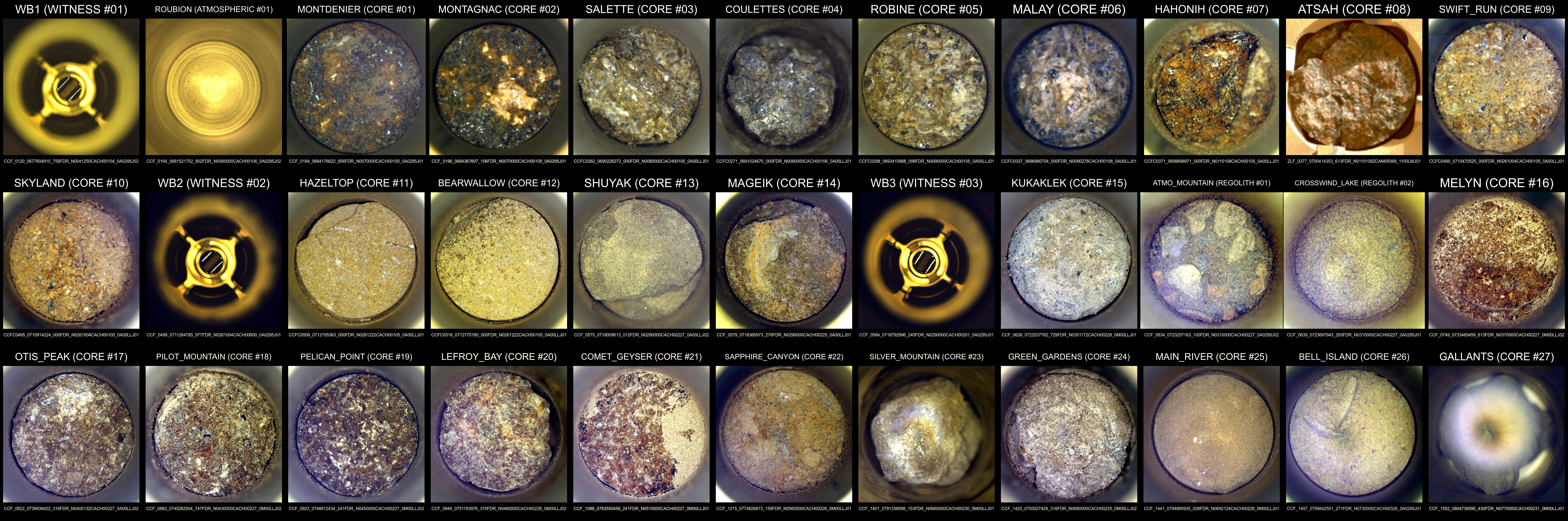
Perseverance rover - cored rock sample collection at 1574 sols (July 24, 2025)

In support of the NASA-ESA Mars Sample Return, rock, regolith (Martian soil), and atmosphere samples are being cached by Perseverance. As of July 2025, 33 out of 43 sample tubes have been filled, including 8 igneous rock samples, 13 sedimentary rock sample tubes, 3 Igneous/Impactite rock sample tubes, a Serpentinite rock sample tube, a Silica-cemented carbonate rock sample tube, two regolith sample tubes, an atmosphere sample tube, and three witness tubes. Before launch, 5 of the 43 tubes were designated "witness tubes" and filled with materials that would capture particulates in the ambient environment of Mars. Out of 43 tubes, 3 witness sample tubes will not be returned to Earth and will remain on rover as the sample canister will only have 30 tube slots. Further, 10 of the 43 tubes are left as backups at the Three Forks Sample Depot.

However, after a project review critical of its cost and complexity, NASA announced that the Mars Sample Return project was "paused" as of November 13, 2023. In a teleconference on April 15, 2024, NASA Administrator Bill Nelson emphasized continuing the commitment to retrieving the samples. However, the $11 billion cost was deemed infeasible. NASA turned to industry and the Jet Propulsion Laboratory (JPL) to form a new, more fiscally feasible mission profile to retrieve the samples.

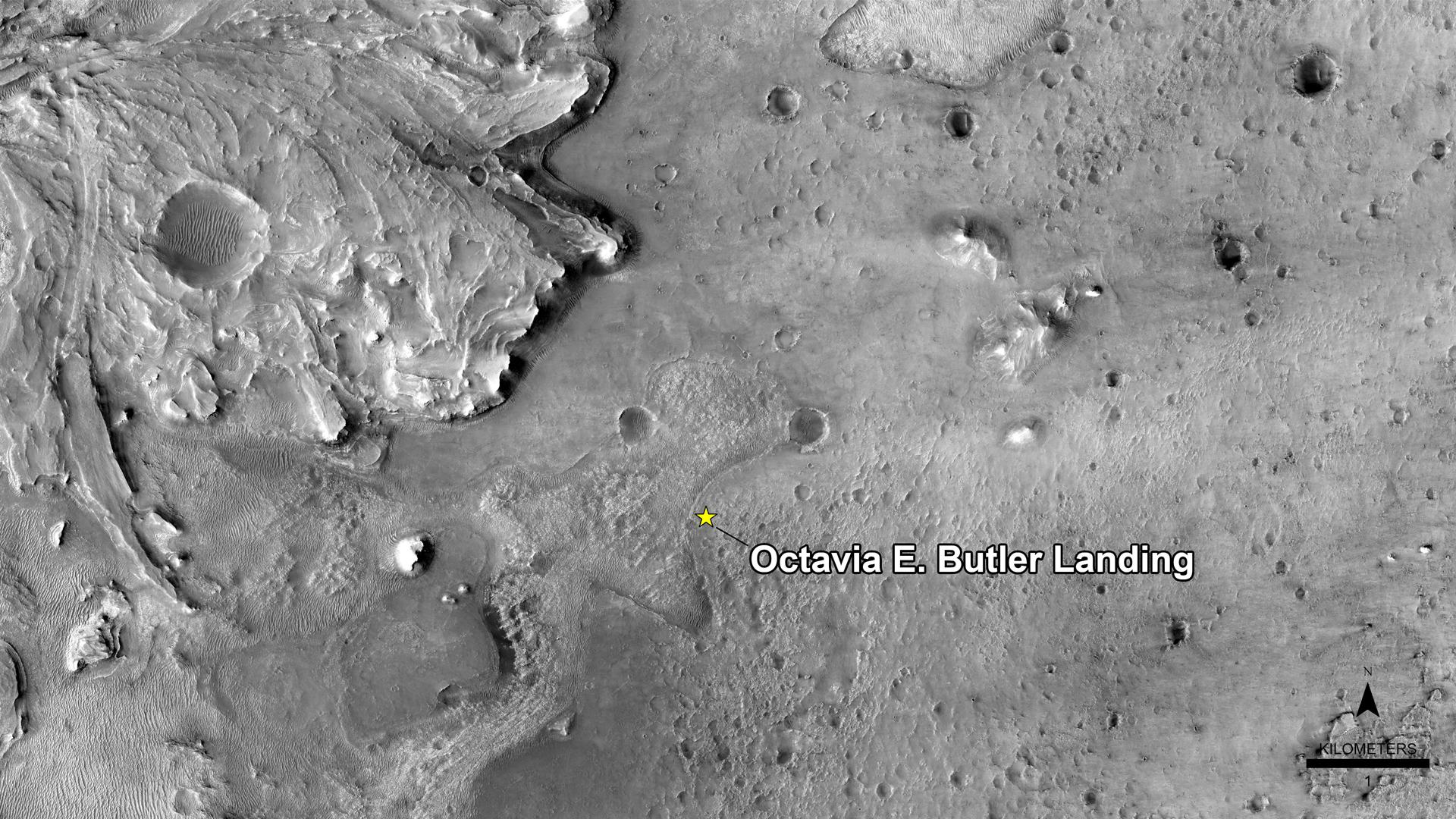
Mars Perseverance rover – Octavia E. Butler Landing Site in the Jezero crater (5 March 2021)

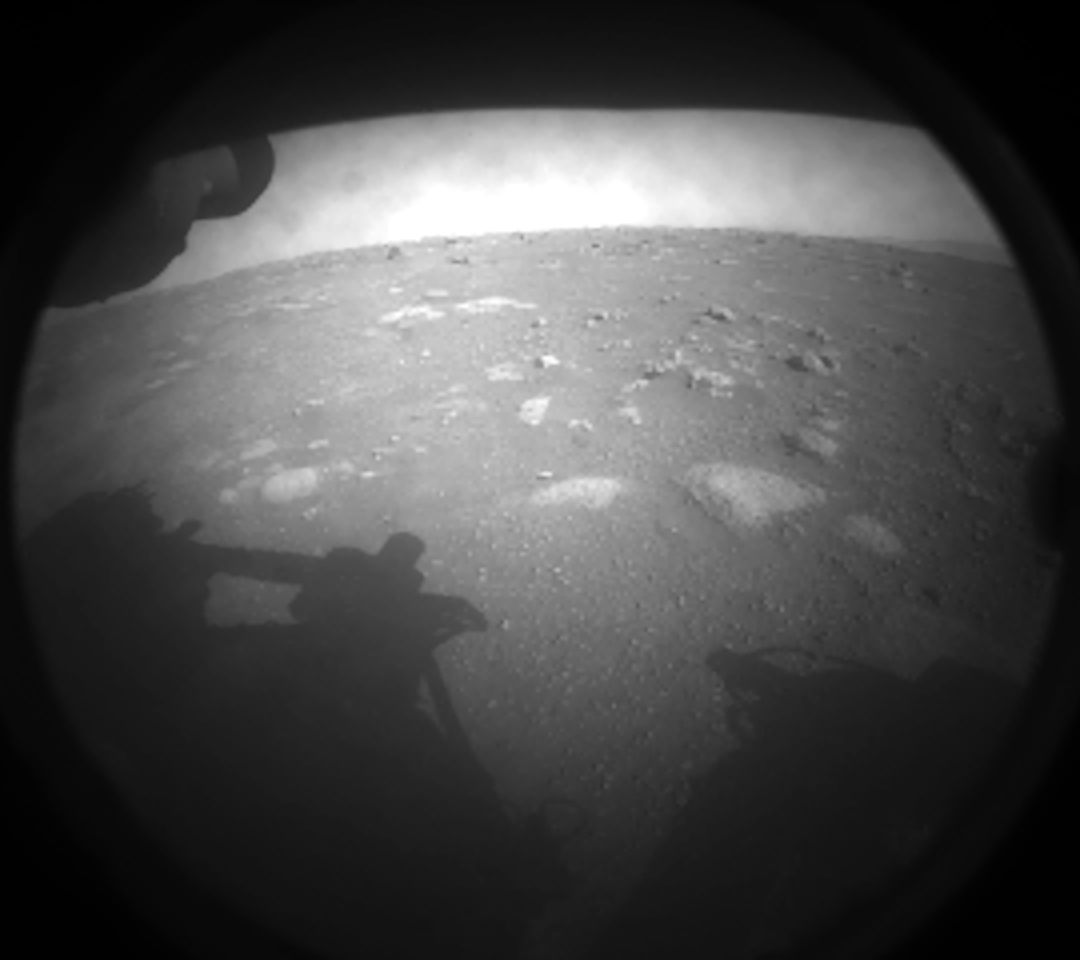
First image taken by the rover after its successful landing

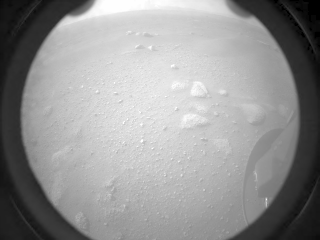
Second Perseverance rover image on Mars

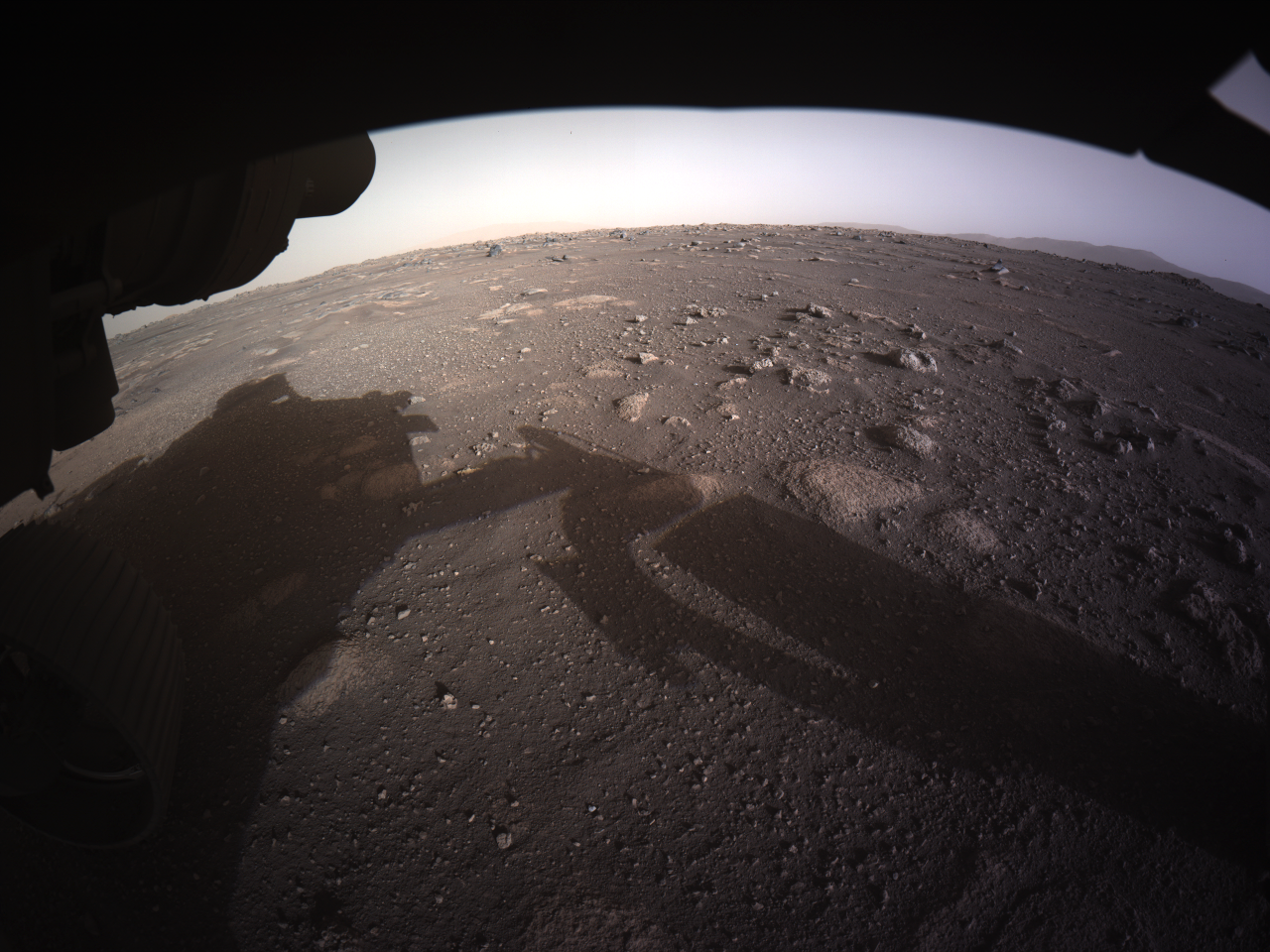
First color image from Perseverance rover after landing

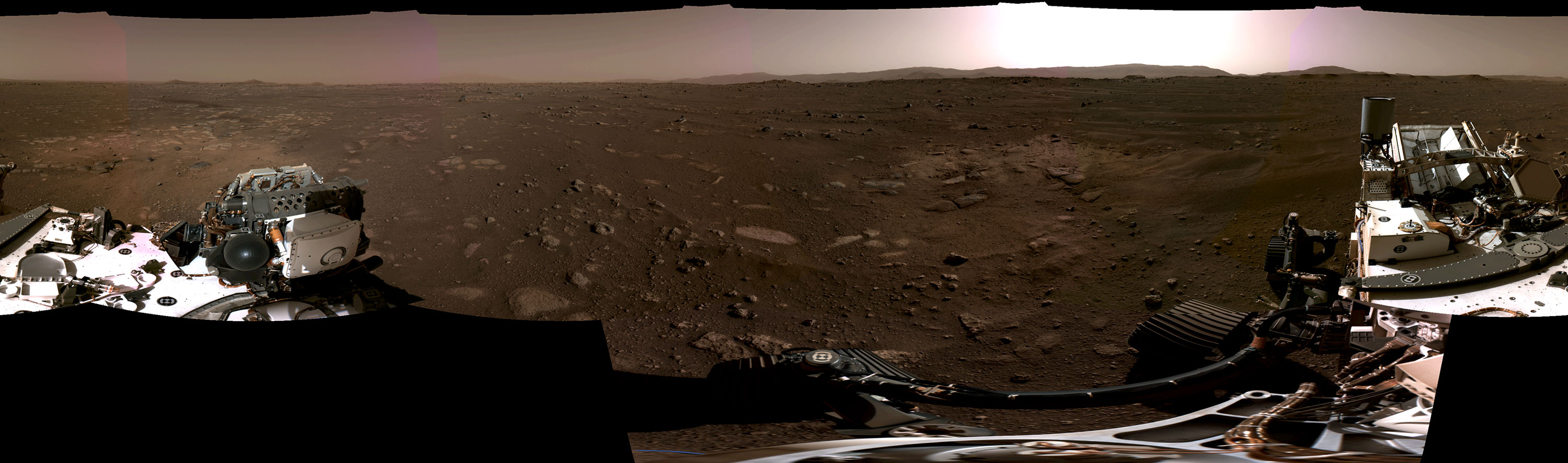
Mars Perseverance rover – Panoramic view of landing site (18 February 2021)

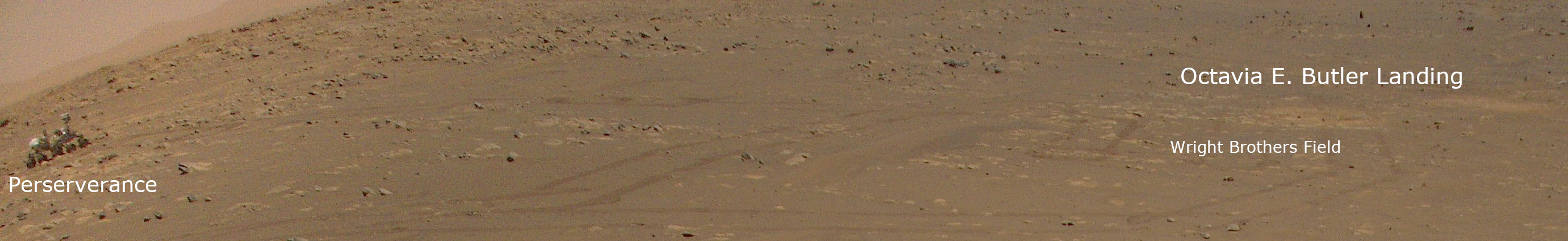
The Ingenuity helicopter views the Perseverance rover (left) about 85 m (279 ft) away from 5.0 m (16.4 ft) in the air (25 April 2021)

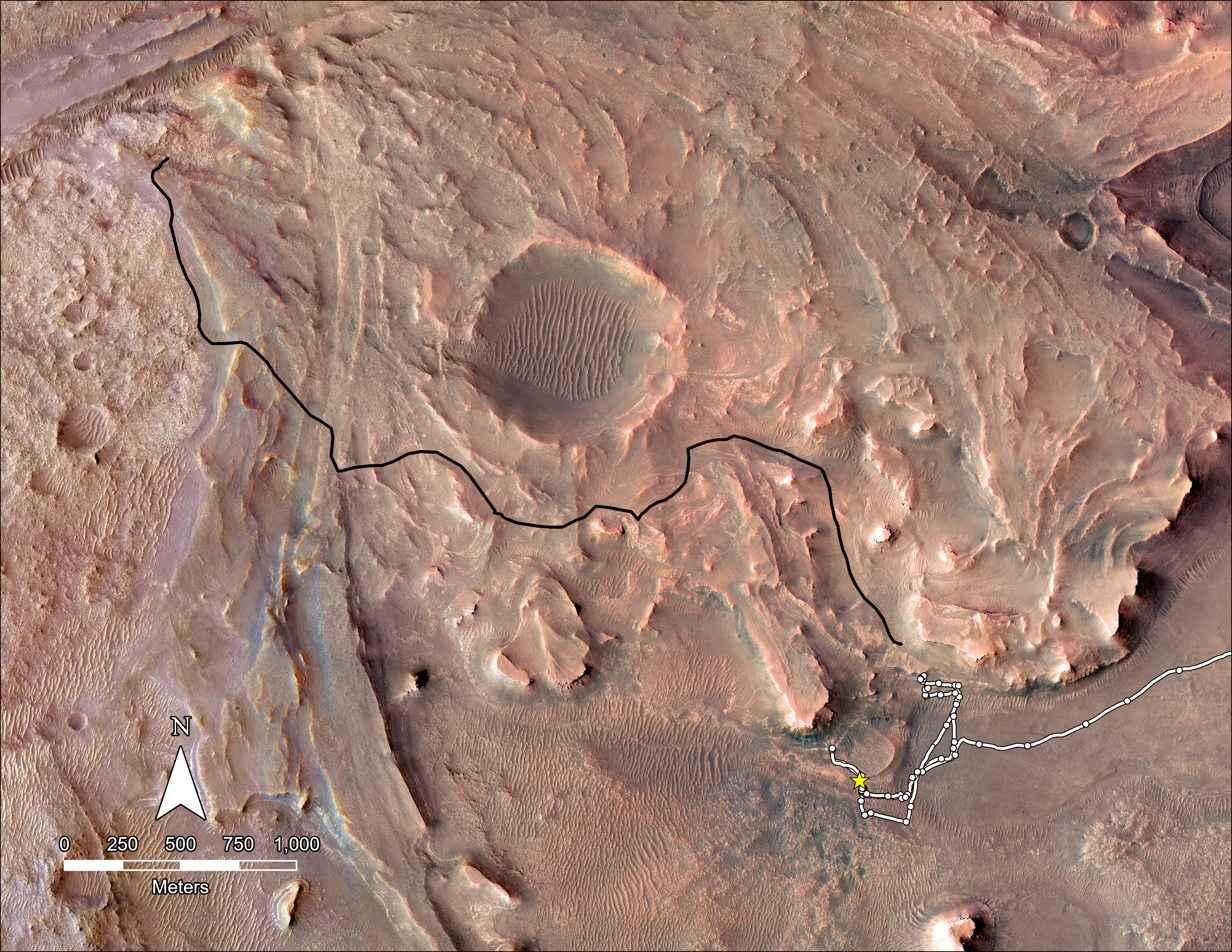
Mars Perseverance rover – Possible route for exploration and study

Ingenuity helicopter

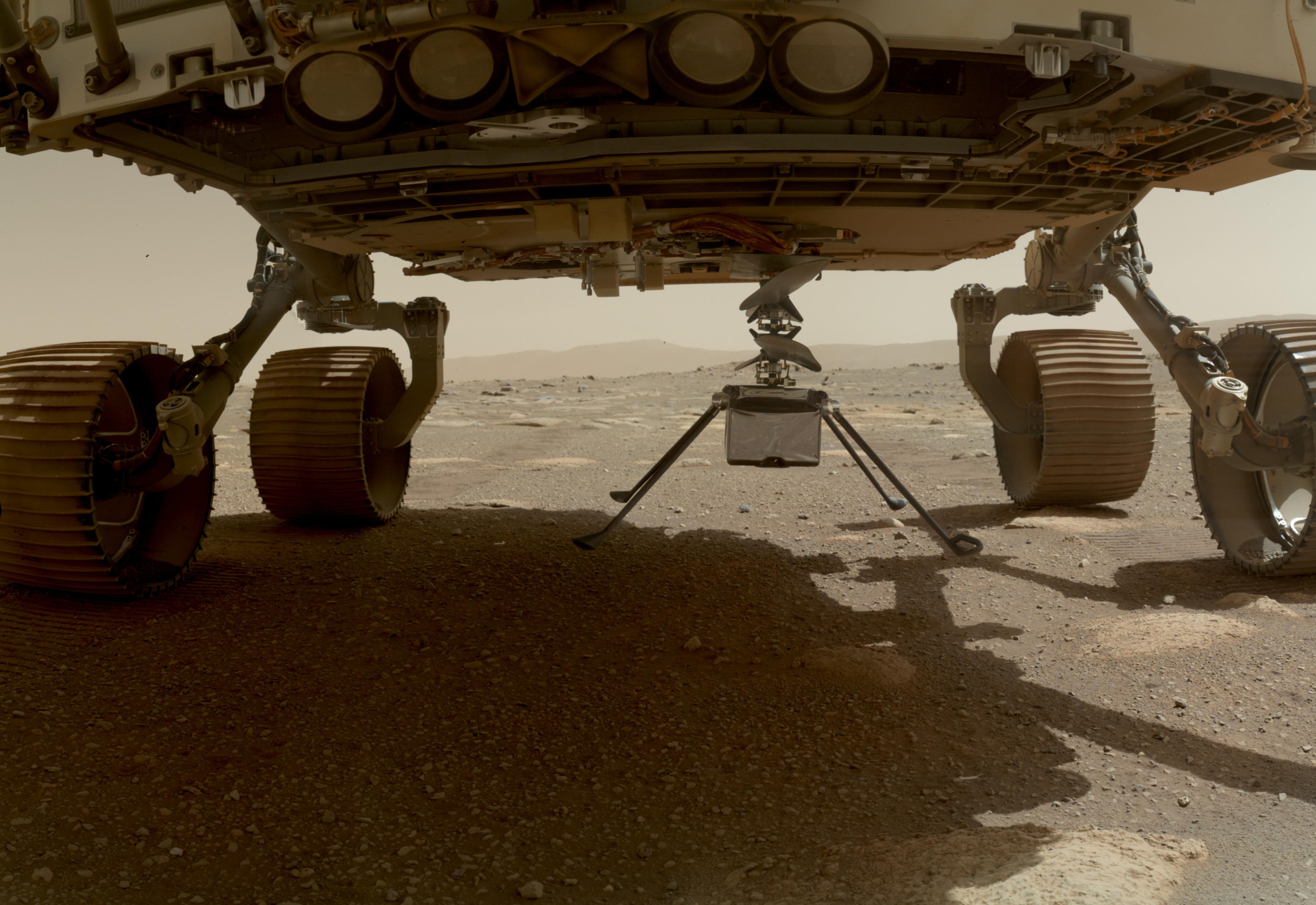
Ingenuity being deployed from under Persevervence

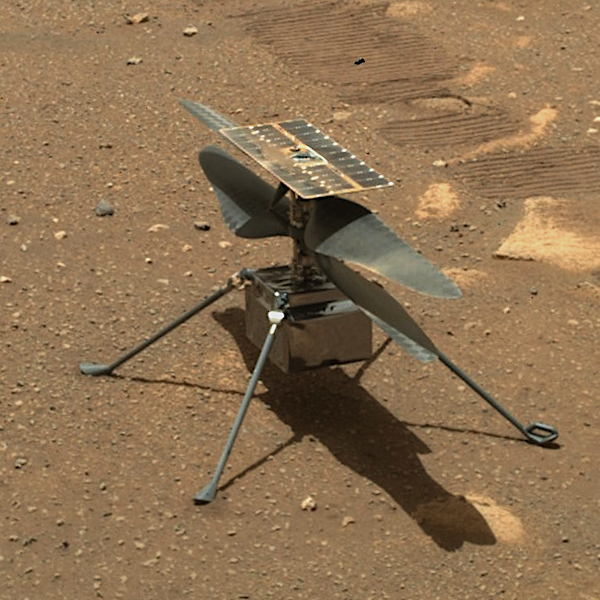
The deployed Ingenuity on Sol 46

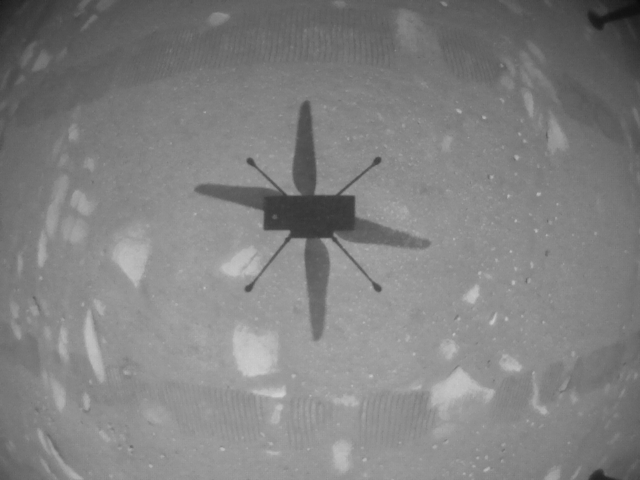
Black-and-white photo from Ingenuity during its first test flight at an altitude of 1.2 m (3 ft 11 in), showing its shadow on the ground

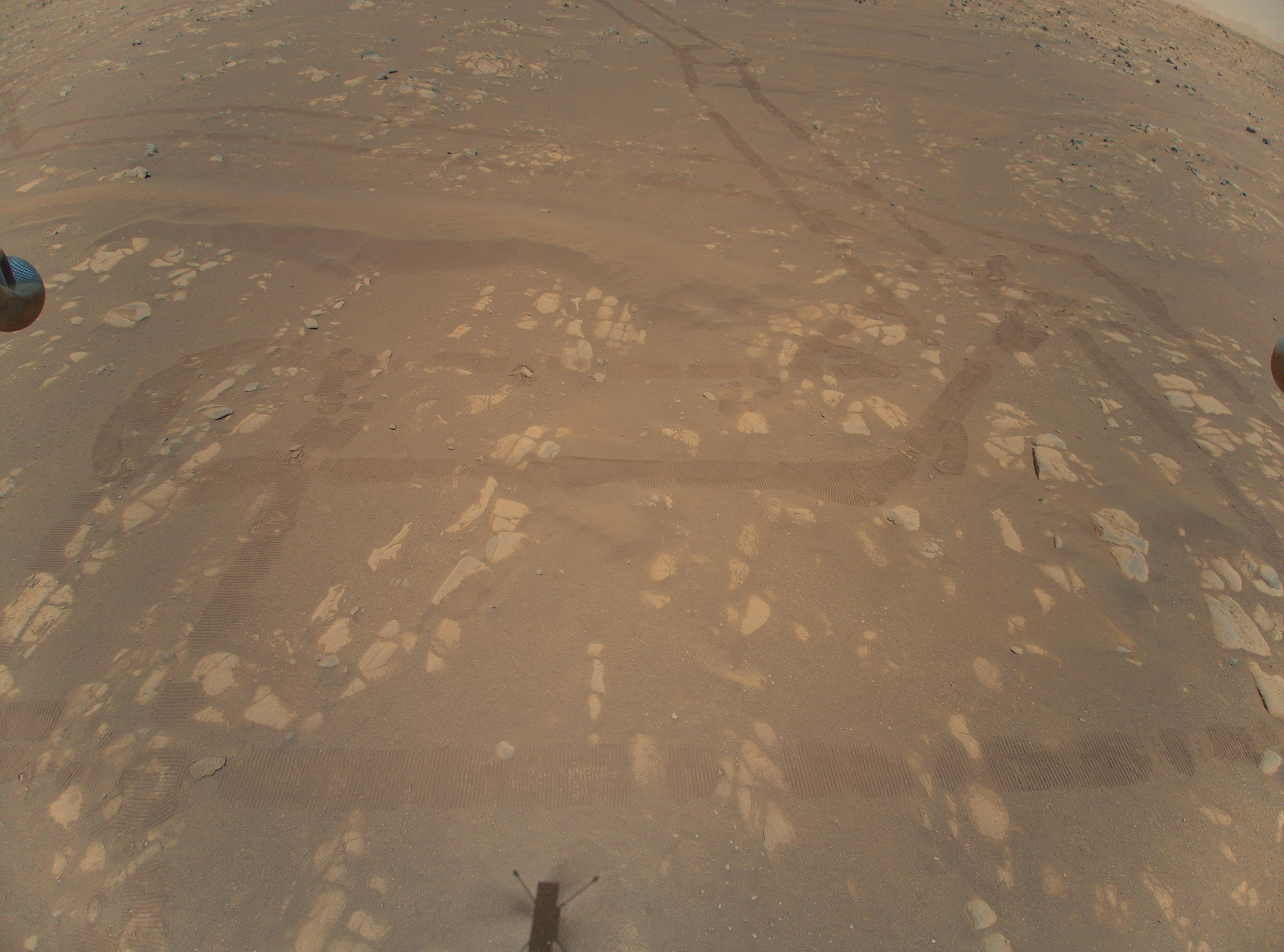
First color aerial image on Mars taken by Ingenuity, at around 5.2 m (17 ft) high in flight

Perseverance captures video, audio of fourth Ingenuity flight
(video; 02:44; 30 April 2021)

Ingenuity after its fifth flight landing on Airfield B (7 May 2021)

Entry-descent-landing debris
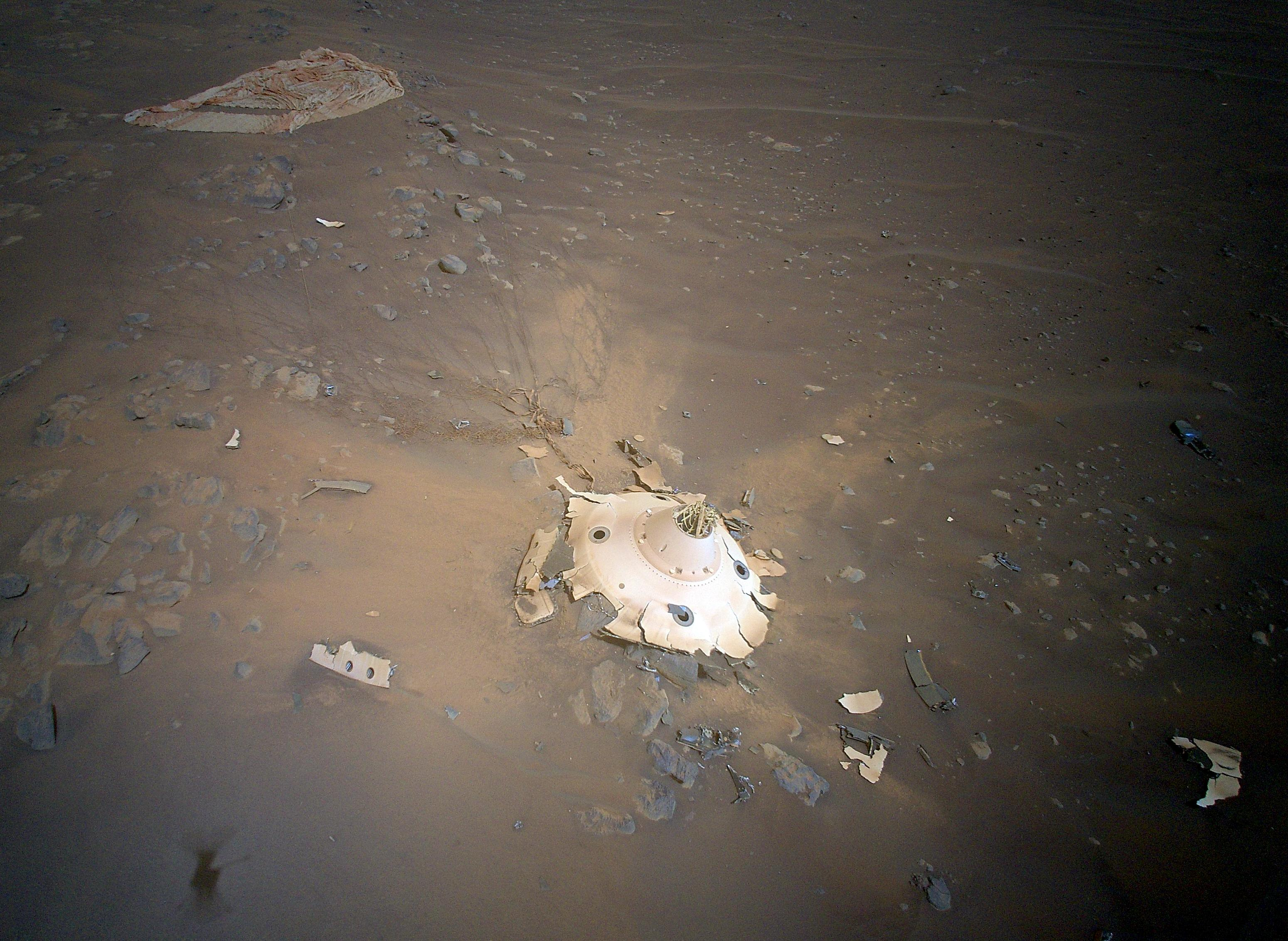
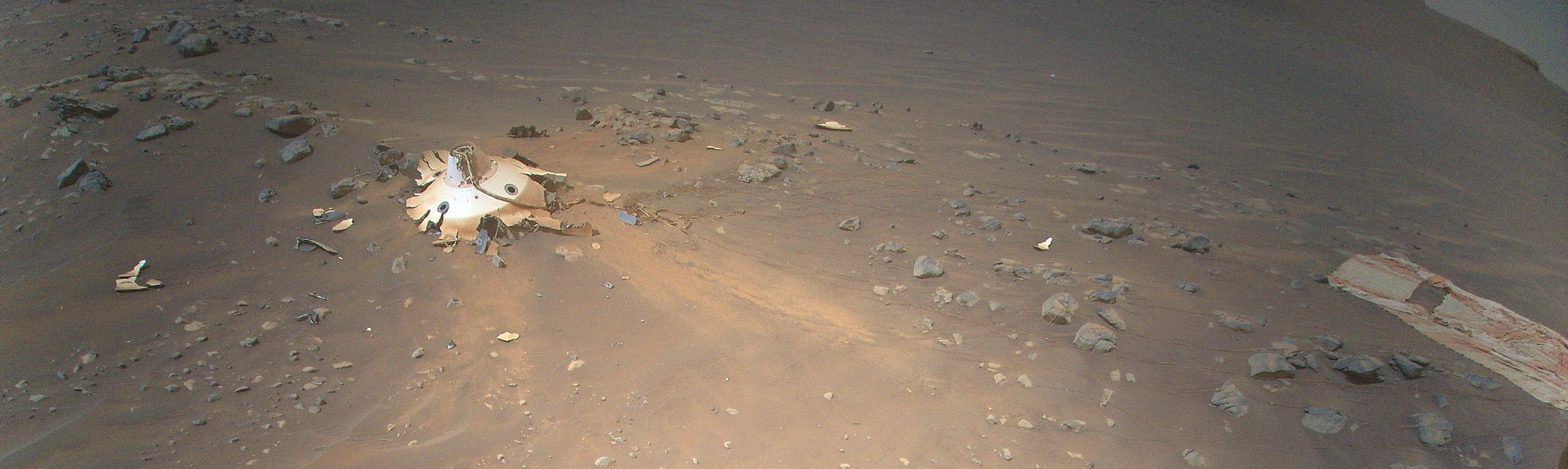
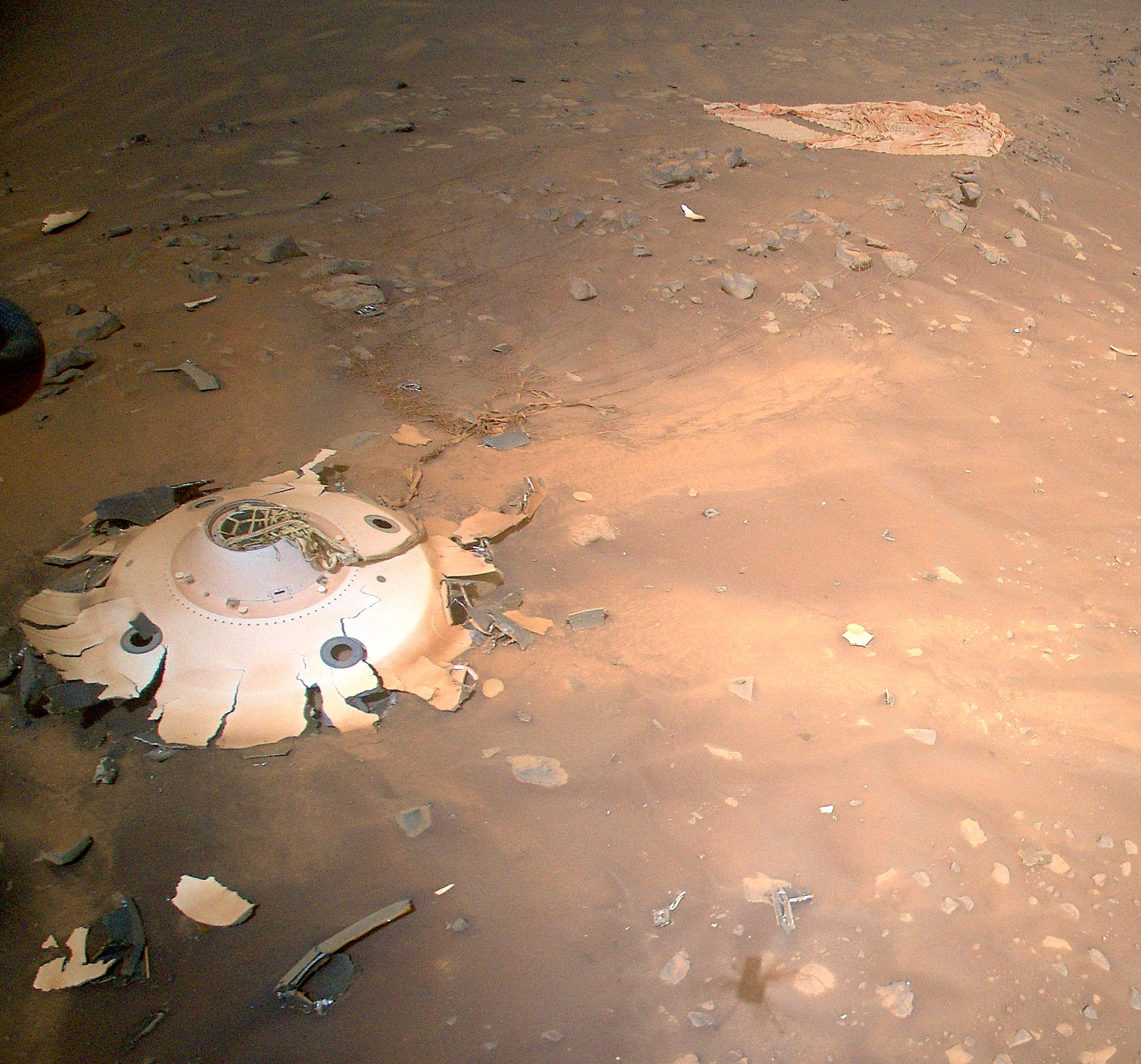
Ingenuity photographed the spacecraft backshell and parachute (April 19).

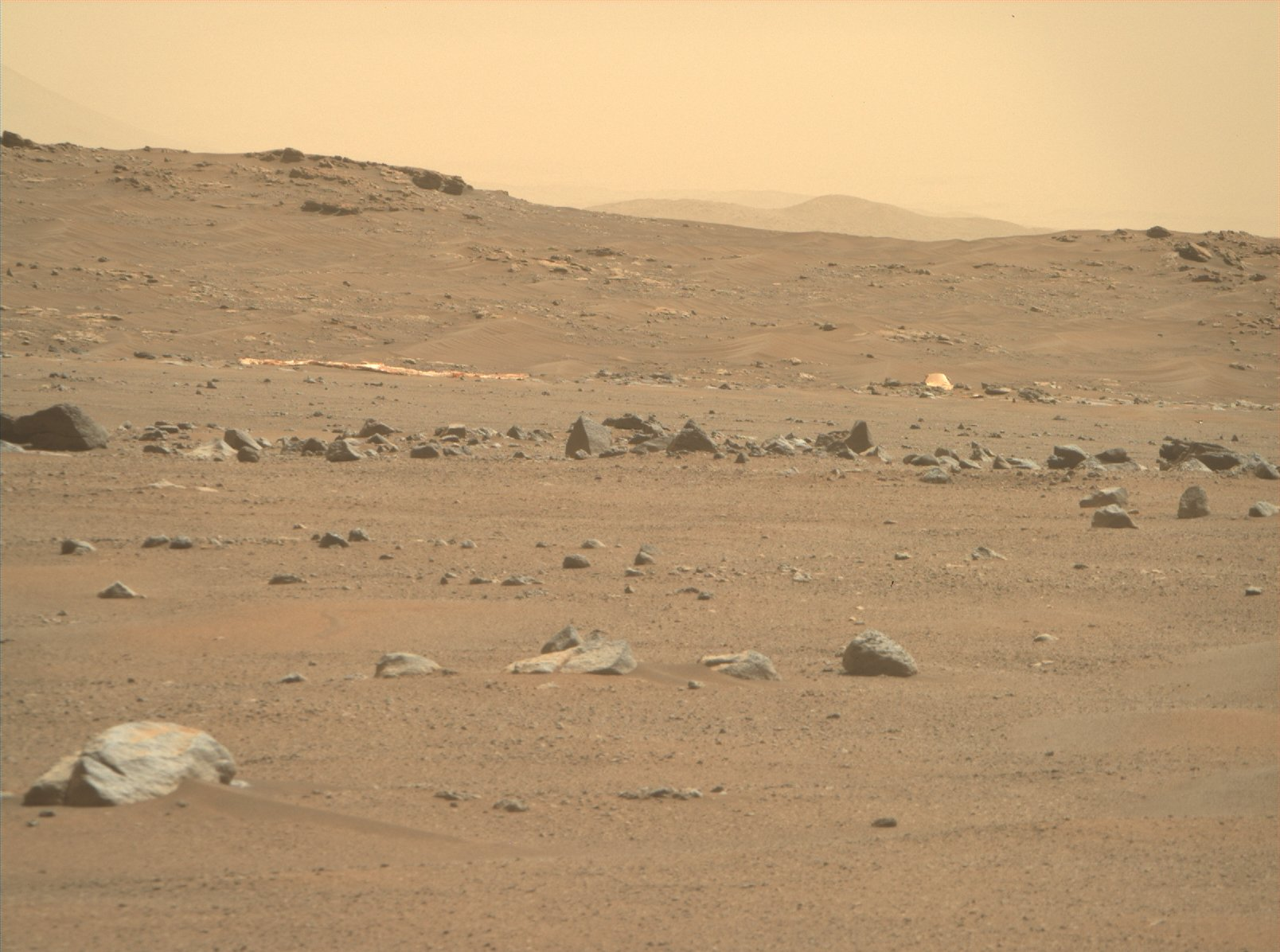
Perseverance photographed the spacecraft backshell and parachute (April 14).

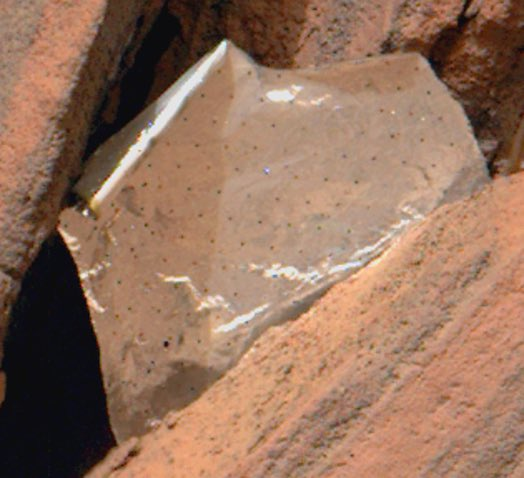
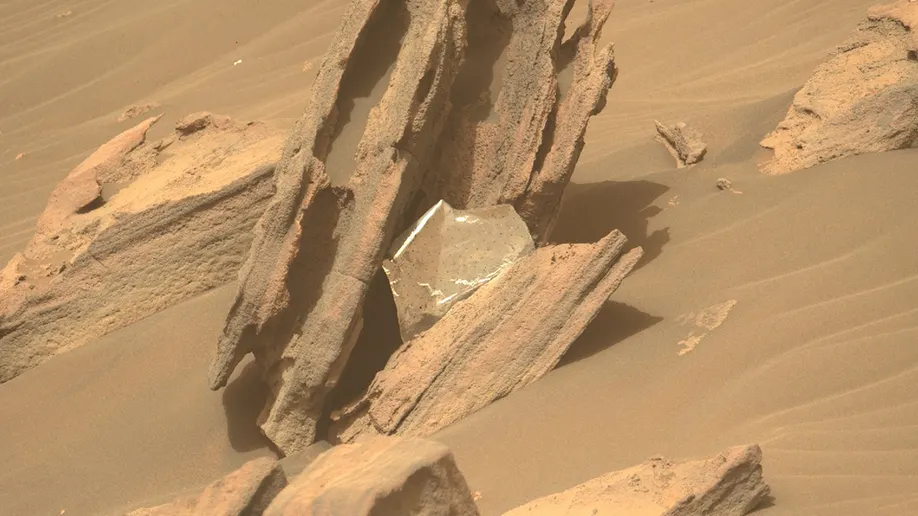

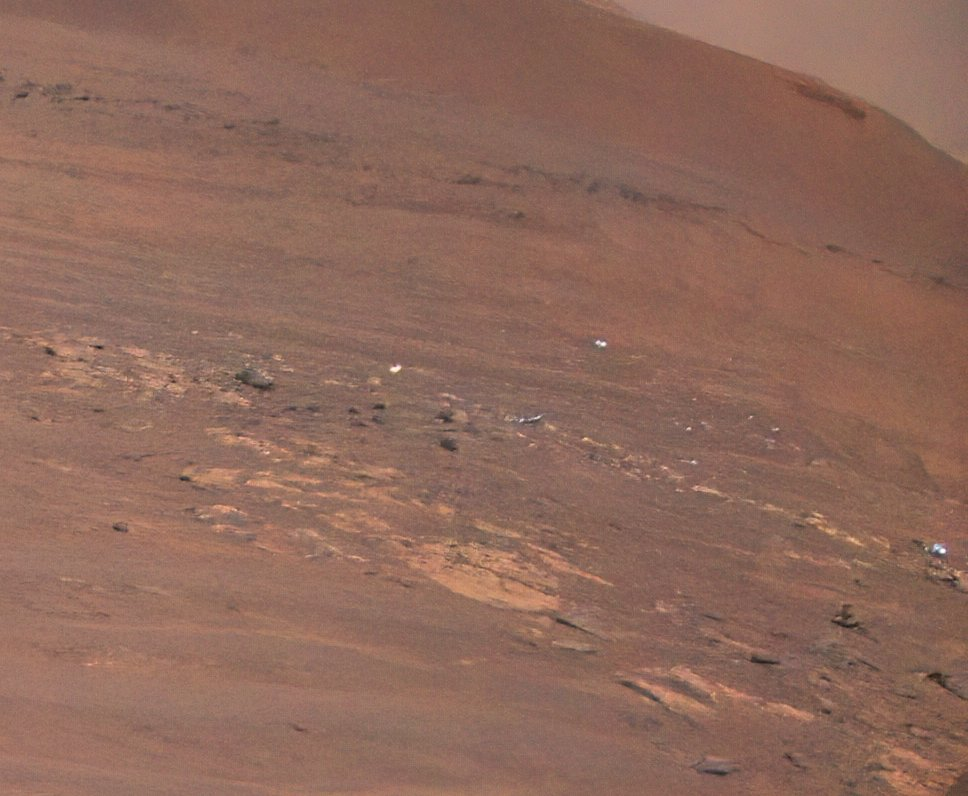
Ingenuity photographed an apparent EDL debris (April 3).

Perseverance photographed a thermal blanket from the skycrane 2 km (1.2 mi) away from its crash site.
Perseverance Rover instruments

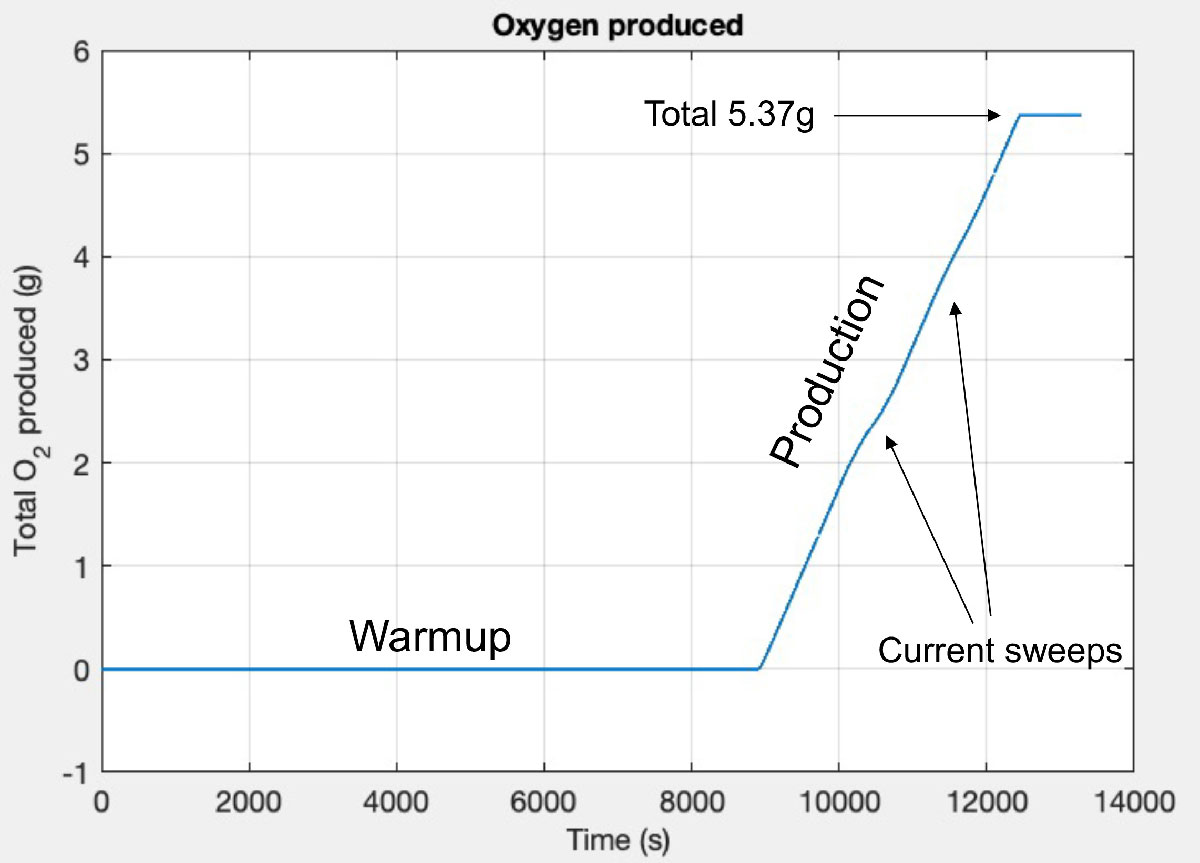
Graph of MOXIE's first martian oxygen production test, 20 April 2021

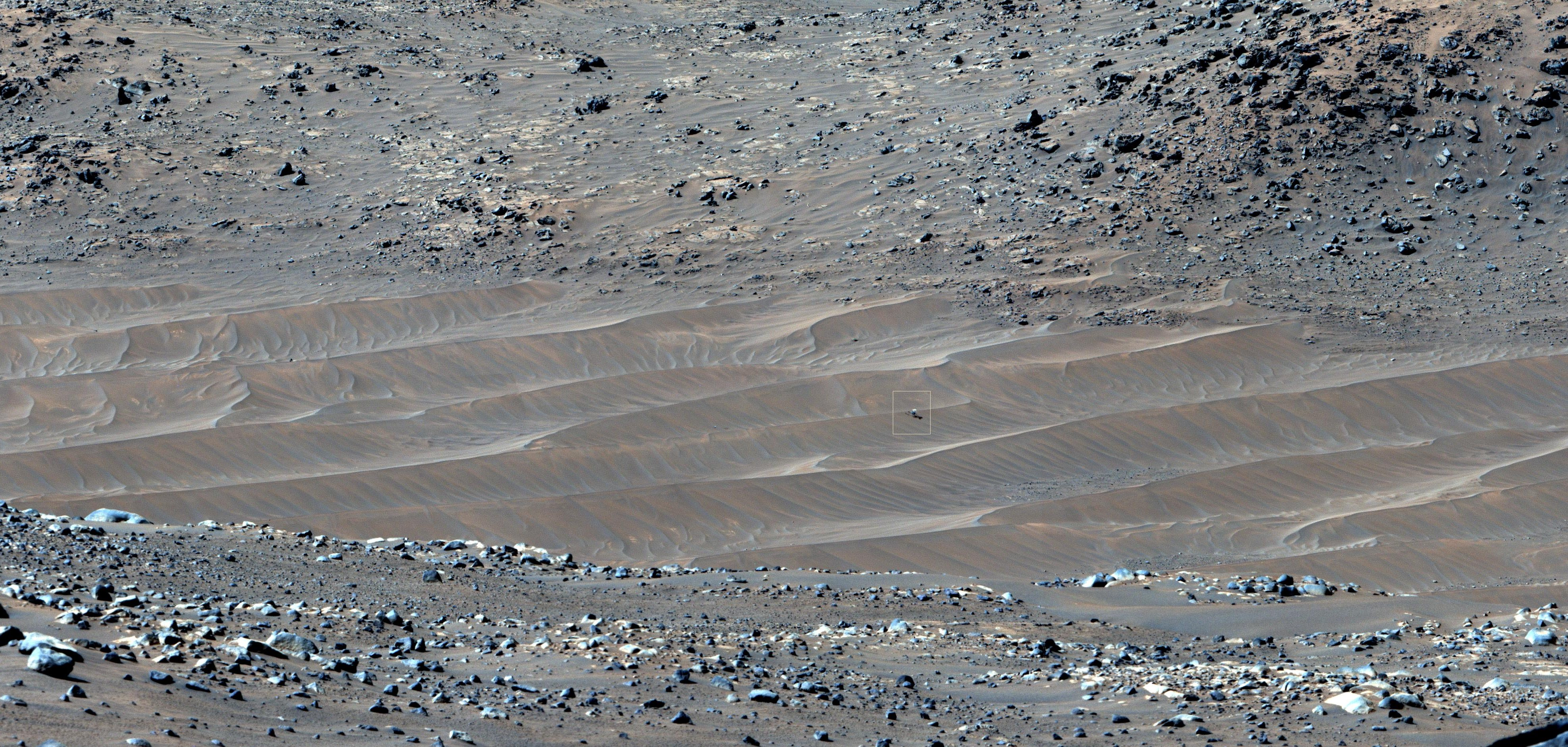
Valinor Hills in the Airfield Chi (χ), Mars, Ingenuity's final airfield (see SQUARE near off-center right of image) as viewed by the Perseverance rover on February 4, 2024

== Cost ==
NASA plans to expend roughly US$2.8 billion on the Mars 2020 mission over 10 years: almost $2.2 billion on the development of the Perseverance rover, $80 million on the Ingenuity helicopter, $243 million for launch services, and $296 million for 2.5 years of mission operations. Adjusted for inflation, Mars 2020 is the sixth-most expensive robotic planetary mission made by NASA and is cheaper than its predecessor, the Curiosity rover. As well as using spare hardware, Perseverance also used designs from Curiosity's mission without needing to redesign them, which helped save "probably tens of millions, if not 100 million dollars" according to Mars 2020 Deputy Chief Engineer Keith Comeaux.

== Public outreach ==
To raise public awareness of the Mars 2020 mission, NASA undertook a "Send Your Name To Mars" campaign, through which people could send their names to Mars on a microchip stored aboard Perseverance. After registering their names, participants received a digital ticket with details of the mission's launch and destination. There were 10,932,295 names submitted during the registration period. In addition, NASA announced in June 2019 that a student naming contest for the rover would be held in the fall of 2019, with voting on nine finalist names held in January 2020. Perseverance was announced to be the winning name on March 5, 2020.

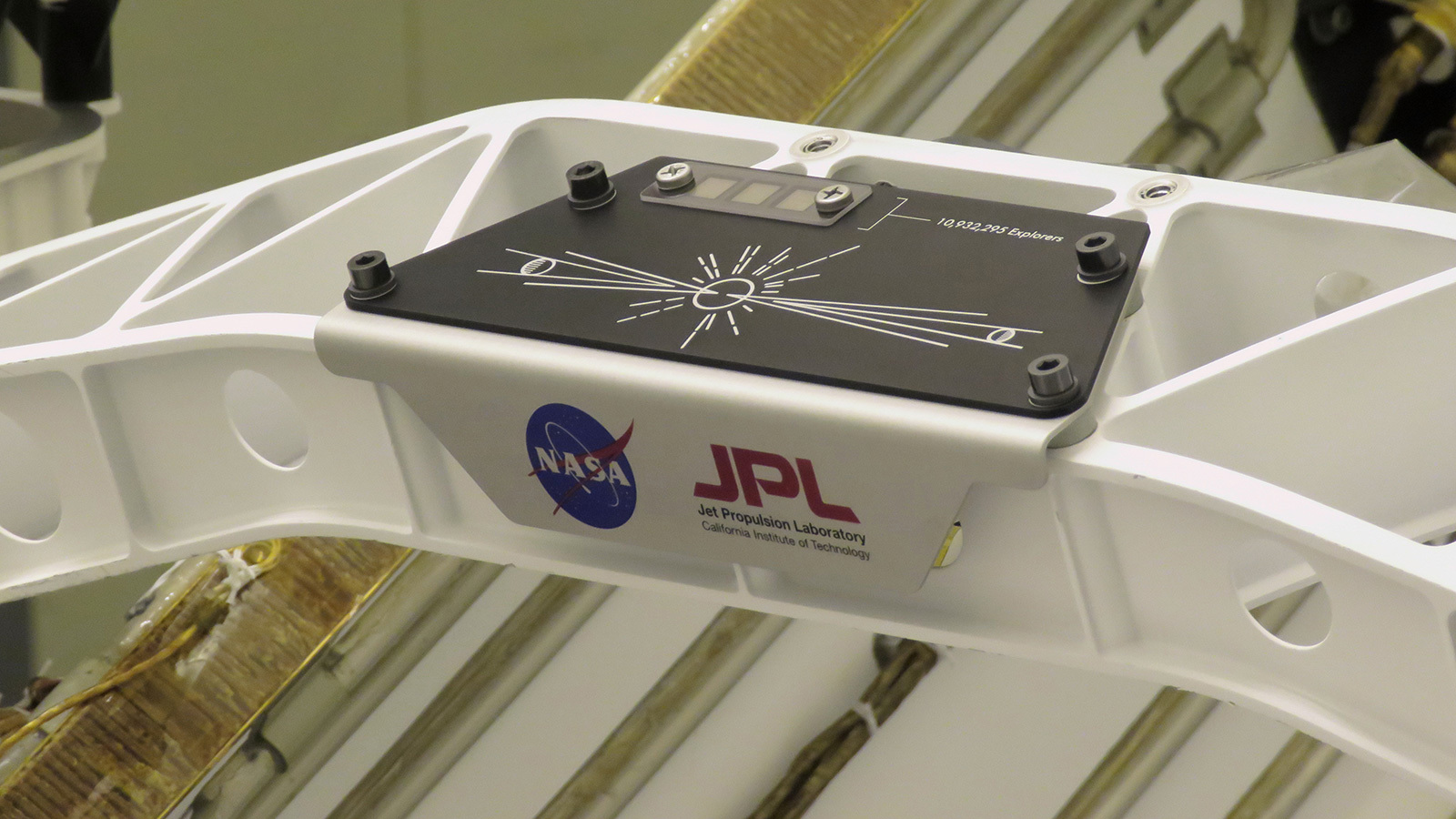
"Send Your Name" placard attached to Perseverance

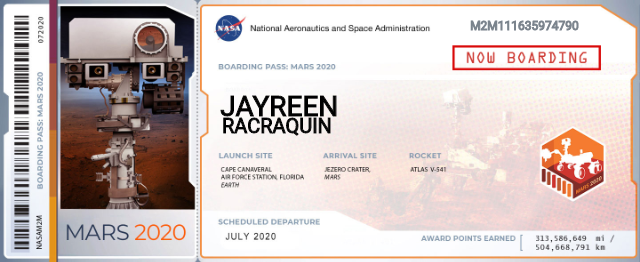
Sample souvenir boarding pass for those who registered their names to be flown aboard the Perseverance rover

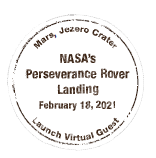
NASA Eventbrite Virtual Guest Program Post flight mission patch given to Eventbrite subscribers

In May 2020, NASA attached a small aluminum plate to Perseverance to commemorate the impact of the COVID-19 pandemic and pay "tribute to the perseverance of healthcare workers around the world". The COVID-19 Perseverance Plate features planet Earth above the Rod of Asclepius, with a line showing the trajectory of the Mars 2020 spacecraft departing Earth.

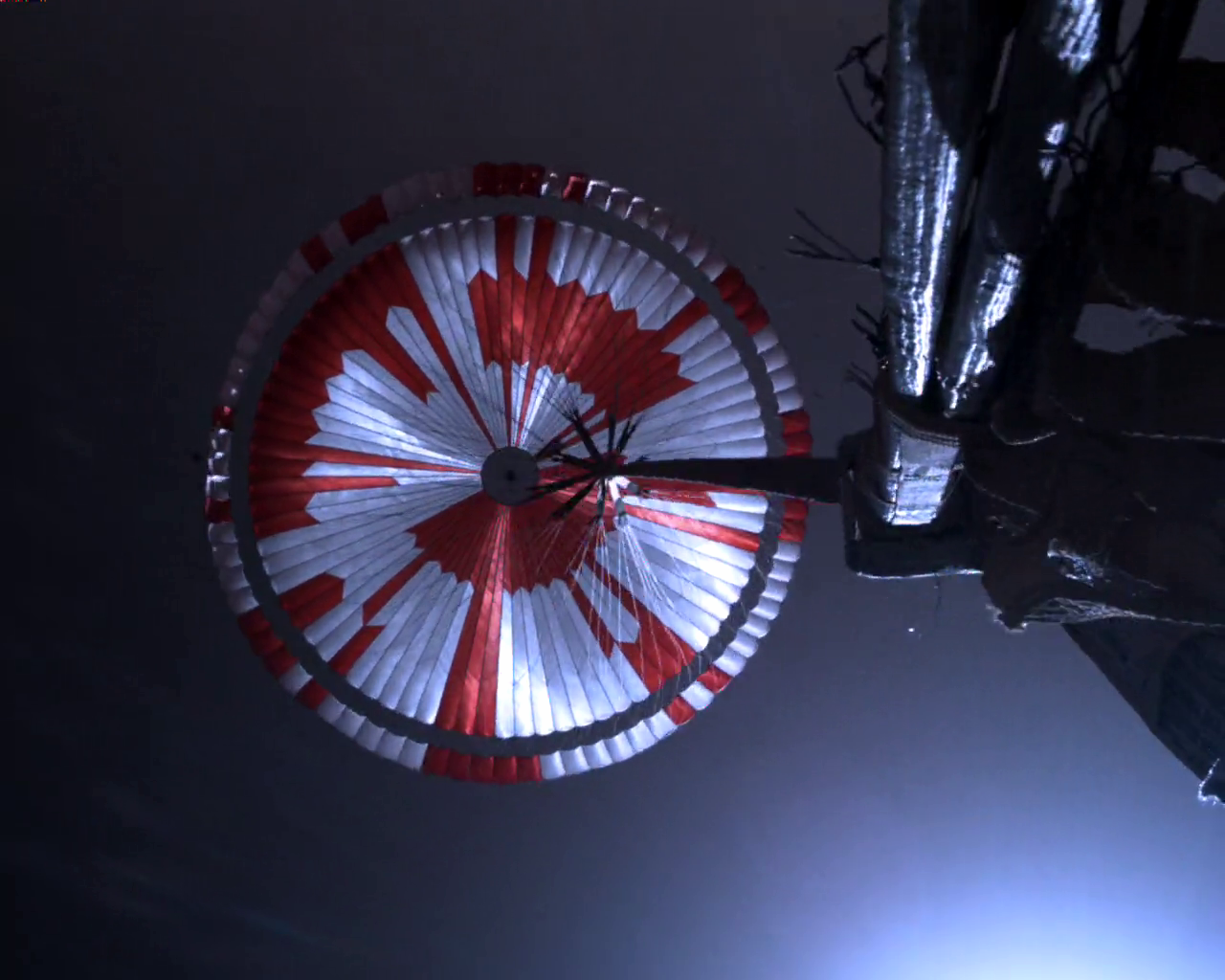
The supersonic parachute that helped decelerate Perseverance carried an Easter egg along with it.

On February 22, 2021, NASA released uninterrupted footage of the landing process of Mars 2020 from parachute deployment to touchdown in a livestream broadcast. Upon release of this footage, engineers revealed that the rover's parachute contained a puzzle; Internet users had solved it within six hours. The parachute's pattern was based on binary code and translated to the motto of JPL (Dare Mighty Things) and the coordinates of its headquarters. Irregular patterns are frequently used on spacecraft parachutes to better determine the performance of specific parts of the parachute.

A small piece of the wing covering from the Wright brothers' 1903 Wright Flyer is attached to a cable underneath Ingenuity's solar panel.

NASA scientist Swati Mohan delivered the news of the successful landing.

== See also ==
- ExoMars, European-Russian Mars exploration program
- Exploration of Mars
- List of missions to Mars
- Mars Astrobiology Explorer-Cacher
