= Britt (name) =

Britt is both a given name and a surname. Notable people with the name include:

== Given name ==
- Britt Allcroft (1943–2024), English producer, writer, director and voice actress
- Britt Arenander (1941–2022), Swedish translator, writer and journalist
- Britt Bager (born 1976), Danish politician
- Britt Baron (born 1991), American actress
- Britt Baker (born 1991), American professional wrestler
- Britt Bohlin Olsson (born 1956), Swedish politician
- Britt Brøndsted (born 1981), Danish ten-pin bowler
- Britt Damberg (1937–2019), Swedish singer and actress
- Britt-Marie Danestig (born 1940), Swedish politician
- Britt Daniel (born 1971), American musician (Spoon)
- Britt Dekker (born 1992), Dutch actress and television presenter
- Britt Edwall (1935–2025), Swedish television and radio presenter and author
- Britt Ekland (born 1942), Swedish actress
- Britt-Marie Ericson (born 1950), Swedish curler
- Britt Hagedorn (born 1972), German television presenter
- Britt G. Hallqvist (1914–1997), Swedish hymnwriter, poet, and translator
- Britt Harkestad (born 1946), Norwegian politician
- Britt Hildeng (1943–2022), Norwegian politician
- Britt Holmquist, Swedish racewalker
- Britt Irvin (born 1984), Canadian actress, singer and voice-over artist
- Britt Johansen (born 1954), Norwegian handball player
- Britt Synnøve Johansen (born 1970), Norwegian singer
- Britt Langlie (born 1945), Norwegian actress
- Britt Karin Larsen (born 1945), Norwegian poet, author and government scholar
- Britt Lindeborg (1928–1998), Swedish lyricist
- Britt Love, British singer (Mini Viva)
- Britt Olauson (born 1945), Swedish politician
- Britt Mjaasund Øyen (born 1944), Norwegian Paralympic cross-country skier and ice sledge hockey player
- Britt McKillip (born 1991), Canadian actress, singer and voice-over-artist
- Britt Mogård (1922–2012), Swedish politician
- Britt Nicole (born 1984), American Christian pop singer
- Britt Ingunn Nydal (born 1989), Norwegian cross-country skier and orienteer
- Britt Raaby (born 1978), Danish freestyle swimmer
- Britt Robertson (born 1990), American actress
- Britt Schultz (born 1945), Norwegian politician
- Britt Strandberg (born 1934), Swedish cross-country skier
- Britt Tully (born 1993), Australian rules footballer
- Britt Walford (born 1970), American rock drummer
- Britt Weerman (born 2003), Dutch high jumper

== Surname ==
- B. J. Britt (born 1982), American actor
- Brian A. Britt, American music professor
- Catherine Britt (born 1984), Australian country music artist
- Charles Robin Britt (born 1942), U.S. Representative from North Carolina
- Chris Britt, editorial cartoonist
- Con Britt (1947–2022), Australian rules footballer
- Dan Britt (born 1950), American astrogeologist
- Darren Britt (born 1969), Australian cricketer
- Donna Britt (news anchor) (1958–2021), American journalist
- Eddie Britt (American football) (1912–1978), American football player
- Eddie Britt (politician) (1926–2013), Australian politician
- Edgar Britt (1913–2017), Australian jockey
- Eileen Britt, New Zealand professor of psychology
- Elton Britt (1913–1972), American country music yodeler and singer
- Fay Britt (1890–1980), American politician
- George Britt (1895–1981), American baseball player
- Glenn Britt (1949–2014), American businessman
- Gwendolyn T. Britt (1941–2008), Maryland state senator
- Harry Britt (1938–2020), American civil rights activist and politician
- Howard Britt (1887–1953), American politician
- Jamal Britt (born 1998), American hurdler
- James Britt (American football) (born 1960), American football player
- James Jefferson Britt (1861–1939), American politician
- Jessie Britt (born 1963), American football player
- Jim Britt (1910–1980), American sportscaster
- Jim Britt (baseball) (1856–1923), American baseball player
- Jimmy Britt (1879–1940), American lightweight boxer
- John J. Britt, American philatelist awarded the Lichtenstein Medal
- Justin Britt (born 1991), American football player
- K. J. Britt (born 1999), American football player
- Katie Britt (born 1982), American attorney and politician
- Kenny Britt (born 1988), American football player
- King Britt (born 1968), American DJ and producer
- Kris Britt (born 1984), Australian rugby league player
- Leo Britt (1908–1979), English actor
- Martin Britt (born 1946), English footballer
- Maurice Britt (1919–1995), American football player, Medal of Honor recipient, and politician
- May Britt (1934–2025), Swedish actress
- Nate Britt (born 1994), American basketball player
- Oscar Britt (1919–1992), American football player
- Peter Britt (1819–1905), American photographer
- Ralph Britt (born 1965), American football player
- Rankin Britt (1915–2001), American football player
- Taylor Britt (born 1996), New Zealand basketball player
- Tom Britt (1936–2026), American interior designer
- Wesley Britt (born 1981), former American football player

== Nickname ==
- Brittany Benn (born 1989), Canadian rugby union player

== Fictional characters ==
- Edie Britt, on the TV series Desperate Housewives portrayed by Nicollette Sheridan
- Ponsonby Britt, fictional executive producer of The Rocky and Bullwinkle Show

== See also ==
- Britt (disambiguation)
