= Doris Daou =

Lebanese-American astronomer (born 1964)

- Born: 1964; Lebanon
- Education: Université de Montréal
- Known for: NASA communications
- Scientific career
- Fields: Astronomy
- Workplaces: National Aeronautics and Space Administration Ames Research Center

Doris Daou (born 1964) is a Lebanese-born Canadian-American astronomer who was formerly the Director for Education and Public Outreach of the NASA Lunar Science Institute and the associate director of the NASA Solar System Exploration Research Virtual Institute (SSERVI), and is currently the program contact for NASA's "Small Innovative Missions for Planetary Exploration (SIMPLEx)".

== Early life and education ==
Daou's family fled war-ravaged Lebanon when she was a child, and settled in Canada. Daou was educated at the Université de Montréal in Quebec, where she studied the atmospheric parameters of variable stars. She holds a B.Sc. in Physics and Mathematics, as well as a M.Sc. in Astronomy and Astrophysics. Her PhD dissertation in 1989 was titled, Études spectroscopiques et paramètres atmosphériques des étoiles ZZ Ceti.

== Career ==
She then moved to Baltimore, Maryland, in the United States, where she spent nine years working on the Hubble Space Telescope. In 1999, Daou transferred to the team preparing to launch the Spitzer Space Telescope, where she worked in education and public outreach and helped found the Spitzer Space Telescope Research Program for Teachers and Students. She joined the NASA Headquarters in 2006, and has served the institution in a variety of roles, including Education and Public Outreach Program Officer. She became the Director of Education and Public Outreach at the NASA Lunar Science Institute - Ames Research Center, in 2008 and the NASA Solar System Exploration Research Virtual Institute (SSERVI) Associate Director in 2010. She has been actively involved in NASA's grant programs. As of 2018, she continues her work as an astronomer at the NASA headquarters in Washington, D.C., and serves as Senior Scientist, as Program Officer and Chief of Staff for the Director of the Planetary Science Division in the Science Mission Directorate (2014–Present).

She has worked as an outreach and education specialist at Ames Research Center and for NASA's grant programs. From 2012 to 2018, Daou served as an associate of commissions for the International Astronomical Union, and has been involved in the following commissions:

- 55 Communicating Astronomy with the Public (2012-2015)
- 55 WG CAP Conferences (until 2015)
- C2 WG CAP Conferences (2015-2018)
- 55 WG Outreach Professionalization & Accreditation (until 2015)
- Outreach Professionalization & Accreditation (2015-2018)
- 55 WG Washington Charter For CAP (until 2015)"

She is the creator and producer of the Ask an Astronomer video podcast. Her research interests include: observational astronomy, astrophysics, and astronomy, as well as solar systems, exoplanets, and international partnerships, and she actively publishes in science journals. In 2008, she co-authored Touch the Invisible Sky, which is a book written in Braille, and in 2017 she co-authored proceedings of the Planetary Science Vision 2050 Workshop as part of the Lunar and Planetary Institute. Doris Daou and Patrick Michel contributed to the International Year Initiative For Planetary Defence 2029. The article indicates an asteroid the size of roughly 370 meters will closely approach Earth. The proposal to raise awareness of the issue is called International Year of Planetary Defence (IYPD2029).

== Selected publications ==
- Daou, D.; Wesemael, F.; Bergeron, P.; Fontaine, G.; Holberg, J. B. (1990). "Spectroscopic Studies and Atmospheric Parameters of Pulsating DA White Dwarf (ZZ Ceti) Stars". The Astrophysical Journal. 364: 242. Bibcode:1990ApJ...364..242D. doi:10.1086/169407.
- Daou, Doris; Skinner, C. J.; Axon, David (1997). "NICMOS Pointed Thermal Background: Results from On-Orbit data". The 1997 HST Calibration Workshop with a New Generation of Instruments: 267. Bibcode:1997hstc.work..267D.
- Daou, Doris (2009). "Education and public outreach initiatives from the National Aeronautics and Space Administration". Proceedings of the International Astronomical Union. 5. doi:10.1017/S1743921311003590.
