= Rubey =

Rubey may refer to:

- Dorsa Rubey, wrinkle ridge system in Oceanus Procellarum on the Moon
- Rubey Glacier, broad, heavily crevassed glacier flowing north to coalesce with the west side of Hull Glacier east of Mount Giles, near the coast of Marie Byrd Land

Given name:

- Rubey M. Hulen (1894–1956), Boone County prosecutor, nominated to the federal bench by President Franklin D. Roosevelt
- Rubey Mosley Hulen (1894–1956), United States federal judge

Surname:

- Thomas L. Rubey (1862–1928), U.S. Representative from Missouri
- William Walden Rubey (1898–1974), American geologist
