= Senator Britt =

Senator Britt may refer to:

- Danny Britt (born 1979), North Carolina State Senate
- Fay Britt (1890–1980), Nebraska State Senate
- Gwendolyn T. Britt (1941–2008), Maryland State Senate
- Howard Britt (1887–1953), Nebraska State Senate
- James Jefferson Britt (1861–1939), North Carolina State Senate
- Katie Britt (born 1982), U.S. Senator from Alabama
