= George Craven (disambiguation) =

George Craven may refer to:

- George Craven, 3rd Earl of Craven (1841–1883), British peer
- George Craven (footballer) (1917–?), English professional footballer
- George Craven (politician) (1895–1950), American politician from Nebraska
