= Stephen J. Mackwell =

New Zealand geophysicist

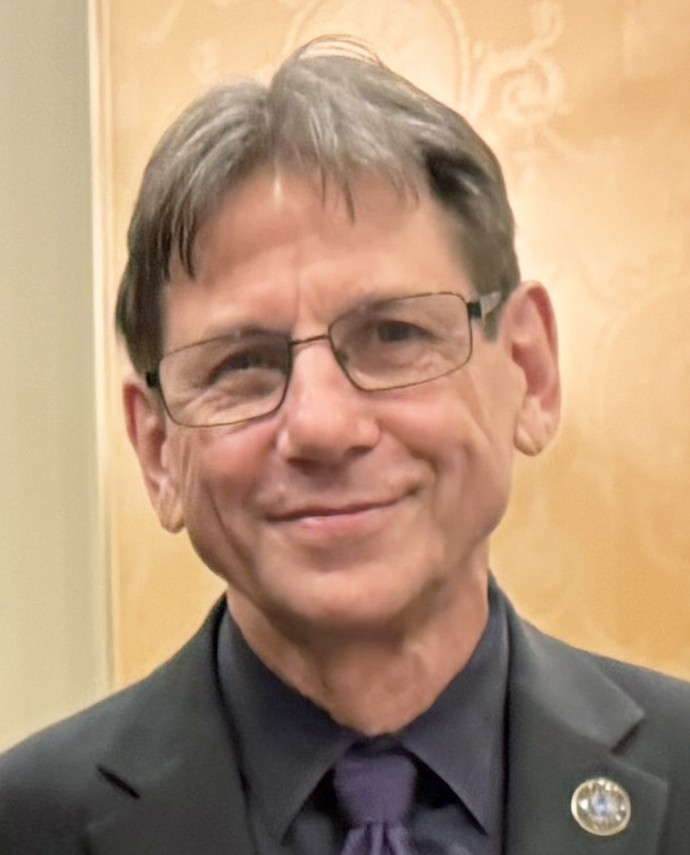
- Born: June 5, 1956 (age 70); Christchurch, New Zealand
- Education: University of Canterbury, Christchurch, New Zealand; Australian National University, Canberra, Australia
- Awards: Asteroid 5292 Mackwell (2016); Fellow of the American Association for the Advancement of Science (2017); Fellow of the American Geophysical Union (2010); Stipendiat der Alexander von Humboldt-Stiftung (1996); Ministère de L'Education Nationale, Academie de Lille, Nommé Professeur (1996); Fellow of the Mineralogical Society of America (1996)
- Scientific career
- Fields: Geophysics, Planetary Science
- Workplaces: Lunar and Planetary Institute; Universities Space Research Association; American Institute of Physics; Rice University; University of Maryland; National Science Foundation

Stephen J. Mackwell is a researcher in geophysics, specializing in laboratory-based studies of the physical, chemical and mechanical properties of geological materials. He is also interested in the transport of fluid components in mantle and crustal rocks on the microscopic and macroscopic scales, and on the effects of such components on mechanical properties. He has authored or co-authored over 80 articles in international scientific journals and is an editor of a book on comparative climatology of terrestrial planets published by the University of Arizona Press.

Mackwell has been an adjunct professor in the Department of Geology at the University of Maryland - College Park since 2022, in the Department of Earth Science at Rice University in Houston, Texas since 2005, and in the Department of Earth Science at the University of Minnesota from 2021 to 2022.

He has served on the editorial board of several geological and planetary science journals, including serving as editor-in-chief for the journal Geophysical Research Letters from 2002 to 2004. He served on the advisory board for the journal Physics and Chemistry of Minerals from 1996 to 2004. Mackwell has participated in the 2013–2022 Planetary Science Decadal Survey Steering Group and Inner Planets Panel. From 2018 until 2025, he was a member of the Space Studies Board, Division on Engineering and Physical Sciences, of the National Academies of Sciences, Engineering, and Medicine. He currently serves on the Board of Directors of the American Friends of the Alexander von Humboldt Foundation and is a member of the Board of Governors for the Cosmos Club and a Board Fellow for the Cosmos Club Foundation. He is the 2nd Vice President of the Geological Society of Washington.

== Education ==
Stephen J. Mackwell received a B.Sc. in Physics and Mathematics in August 1978 at the University of Canterbury in Christchurch, New Zealand. He continued his studies at the University of Canterbury and earned his M.Sc. in Physics in August 1979. His master's thesis was titled "Excitation Temperatures for Late Type Stars." He went on to receive his Diploma of Education at Christchurch Teachers College in New Zealand in November 1979. He earned his Ph.D. in Geophysics in March 1985 from the Research School of Earth Sciences of the Australian National University, Canberra, Australia. His dissertation was titled "Diffusion and Weakening Effects of Water in Quartz and Olivine."

== Early career ==
Stephen J. Mackwell worked as a postdoctoral fellow in the Department of Materials Science and Engineering at Cornell University in Ithaca, New York, from 1984 to 1987, and then moved to the Pennsylvania State University in University Park, Pennsylvania, as an assistant professor in 1987 and subsequently associate professor of geosciences in 1992. He was program director for geophysics in the Earth Sciences Division at the National Science Foundation in Washington, D.C., from 1993 to 1994, and spent 1996 as an Alexander von Humboldt Fellow at the Bayerisches Geoinstitut in Bayreuth, Germany. In 1998, Mackwell became a full professor for experimental geophysics at the Bayerisches Geoinstitut at the University of Bayreuth. In January 2000 he was appointed director of the Bayerisches Geoinstitut and served there until December 2002.

== Director of the Lunar and Planetary Institute ==
Mackwell returned to the United States in late 2002 as director of the Lunar and Planetary Institute (LPI) in Houston, Texas, a division of the Universities Space Research Association (USRA). In addition, Mackwell managed USRA's Houston facility and education programs including the NASA Internships Program and the Air Force Research Laboratory Intern Program. In 2016, Louise Prockter became the Director of the LPI, and Mackwell was named as the USRA Corporate Director of Science Programs.

== American Institute of Physics ==
From February 2019 until June 2021, Mackwell served as the Deputy Executive Officer of the American Institute of Physics in College Park, MD.

== National Science Foundation ==
From April 2022 to March 2025, Mackwell served as the Section Head for Disciplinary Programs and subsequently Deputy Division Director (Acting) in the Division of Earth Sciences of the Geosciences Directorate at the National Science Foundation in Alexandria, VA.

== Honors ==
Stephen J. Mackwell received a Director's Award for Superior Accomplishment from the National Science Foundation in 2023. He was named Fellow of the American Association for the Advancement of Science in 2017; Fellow of the American Geophysical Union in 2010; Stipendiat der Alexander von Humboldt-Stiftung in Bayreuth, Germany in 1996; Ministère de L'Education Nationale, Academie de Lille, Nommé Professeur in 1996; and Fellow of the Mineralogical Society of America in 1996.

In 2016, Mackwell was honored by the International Astronomical Union (IAU) with the naming of main-belt asteroid 5292 Mackwell (formerly designated as 1991 AJ1). Hitoshi Shiozawa and Minoru Kizawa originally discovered asteroid 5292 Mackwell on January 12, 1991, in Fujieda, Shizuoka Prefecture, Japan. 5292 Mackwell has an absolute magnitude of 11.9 and is part of the main asteroid belt, which is located between the orbits of planets Mars and Jupiter.

== Bibliography ==
Mackwell S. J., Simon-Miller A. A., Harder J. W., and Bullock M. A., eds. (2013) Comparative Climatology of Terrestrial Planets. University of Arizona Press, Tucson, AZ. 592 pp.

Demouchy S. and Mackwell S. (2006) Mechanisms of hydrogen incorporation and diffusion in iron-bearing olivine. Physics and Chemistry of Minerals, 33, 347, doi:10.1007/s00269-006-0081-2.

Mackwell S. J., Zimmerman M. E., and Kohlstedt D. L. (1998) High-temperature deformation of dry diabase with application to tectonics on Venus. Journal of Geophysical Research–Solid Earth, 103(B1), 975–984, doi:10.1029/97JB02671.

Kohlstedt D. L., Evans B., and Mackwell S. J. (1995) Strength of the lithosphere: Constraints imposed by laboratory experiments. Journal of Geophysical Research–Solid Earth, 100(B9), 17587–17602, doi:10.1029/95JB01460.
