= Arctic Planetary Science Institute =

- Established: 2013
- Focus: Planetary science
- Chair: Teemu Öhman
- Location: virtual, Rovaniemi, Finland
- Website: planetaryscience.fi

The Arctic Planetary Science Institute, or APSI (Finnish: (unofficially) Arktinen planeettatutkimusinstituutti) is an independent organization dedicated to conducting science in planetary geology and other closely related fields. APSI focuses on research, public outreach, and collaboration with other similar minded parties.

APSI is a virtual and international institute operating through free interaction between scientists. It is run by Finnish planetologists and its headquarters is located at the Arctic Circle in Rovaniemi, Finnish Lapland (hence the name).

The institute was formed in 2013 and officially registered in Finland in 2015. Currently (2018) it has 12 scientists operating in three countries.

== Science ==
Research in APSI is not restricted to specific topics. Current projects include:

- Age determination of impact craters in Fennoscandia;
- Interaction between glacial and volcanic activity in the Hellas region on Mars;
- Venusian surface mapping;
- Public outreach.

The institute has its own scientific contribution series. As of March 2018, there are nine APSI contributions.

In 2016 APSI saved NASA's Nordic Regional Planetary Image Facility by moving the materials to Lappajärvi. Previously the NRPIF was situated at University of Oulu.

== Insignia ==
In the APSI insignia design, the lighter sphere represents Earth and the darker one other solid surface bodies in the Solar System. The curved line represents information flow towards Earth. The relative sizes of the spheres correspond to those of Earth and Mars, with the bulge at the end of the curved line corresponding to the relative size of the dwarf planet Pluto. The line transecting the top of both Earth and the acronym "APSi" represents the northern polar circle.
