= Ulla-Britt =

Ulla-Britt or Ulla-Britta is a Scandinavian compound given name.

People with the name include:

- Ulla-Britt Eklund (born 1934), Swedish swimmer
- Ulla-Britt Hedenberg (1927–2024), Swedish actress, mother of actor Johan Hedenberg
- Ulla-Britta Lagerroth (1927–2021), Swedish literary critic
- Ulla-Britt Lilleaas (born 1944), Norwegian sociologist
- Ulla-Britt Söderlund (1943–1985), Swedish costume designer
- Ulla-Britt Wieslander (1942–2023), Swedish sprinter

== See also ==
- Ulla
- Britt (name)
