= Shlomi Arnon =

Israeli professor

- שלומי ארנון
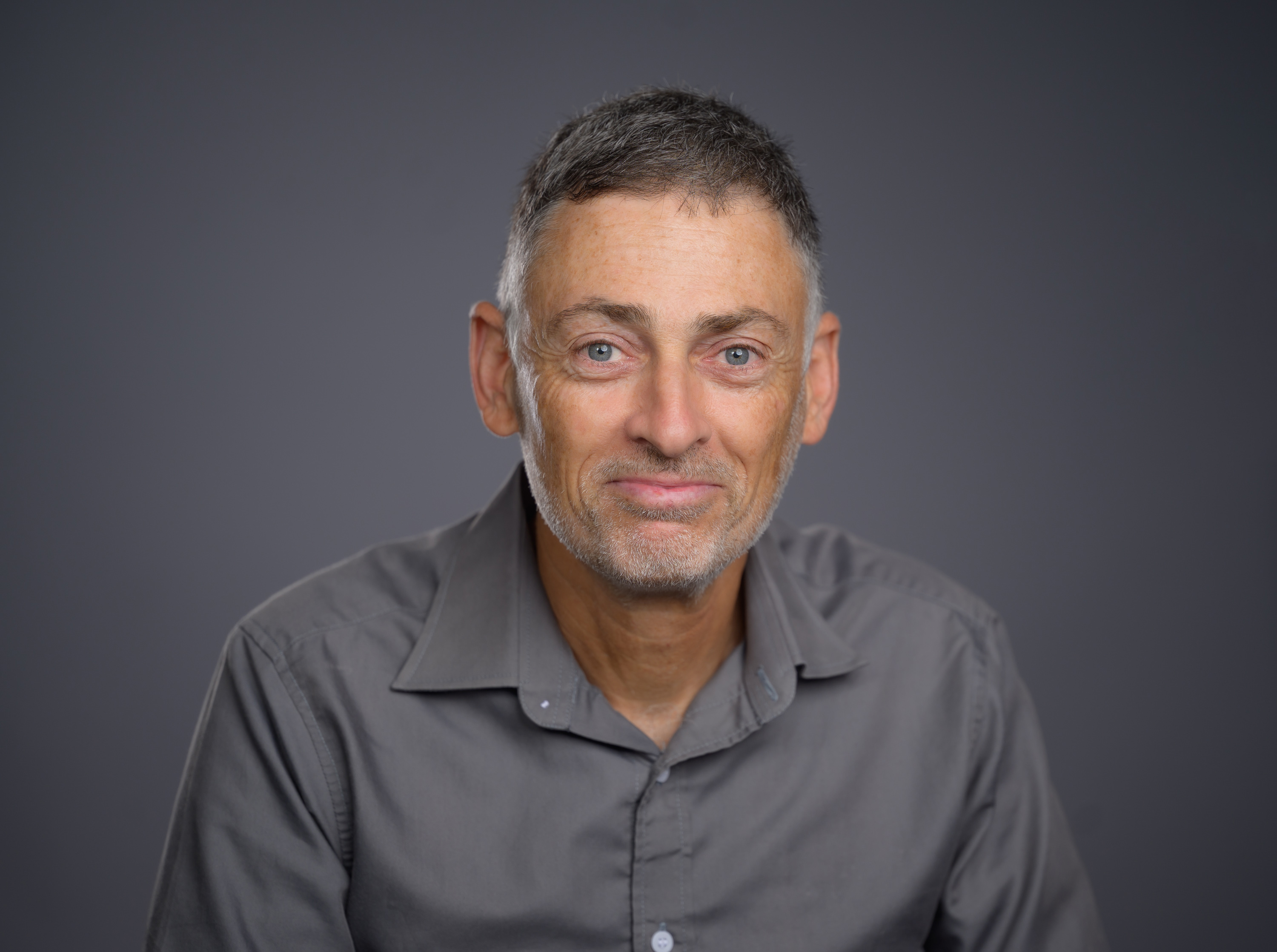
- Born: Israel
- Education: Ben Gurion University of the Negev
- Awards: fellow of the Society of Photo-Optical Instrumentation Engineers
- Scientific career
- Fields: Optics, photonics, Communication
- Workplaces: Ben Gurion University of the Negev, MIT

Shlomi Arnon (Hebrew: שלומי ארנון), is a professor in the Department of Electrical and Computer Engineering at Ben Gurion University of the Negev (BGU), Israel. In addition to his role as a professor, he serves as the director of both the Center for Quantum Science and Technology (BGU-QST) and the Satellite and Wireless Communication Laboratory at the university. For his contributions to the field of optics and photonics, he has been recognized as a fellow of the International Society for Optics and Photonics (SPIE).

== Early life and education ==
Shlomi Arnon earned his B.Sc., M.Sc., and Ph.D. degrees from the Department of Electrical and Computer Engineering at Ben Gurion University of the Negev, where he was mentored by professors Natan Kopeika and Stanley Rotman. During his doctoral studies, he made contributions to the field of laser satellite communication, which laid the foundation for his future research in the field.

== Career ==
Arnon's postdoctoral research at Massachusetts Institute of Technology (MIT) was made possible by his status as a Fulbright Fellow. After completing his post doctoral studies, he joined the Department of Electrical and Computer Engineering at Ben Gurion University of the Negev, where he rose to the rank of full professor in 2011. He has also held visiting positions at several institutions, including Eindhoven University of Technology, Philips Lab in the Netherlands, TU Delft, and Cornell University. Arnon was also appointed as the Israeli representative at NASA's Solar System Exploration Research Virtual Institute (SSERVI) for several years. Arnon has been recognized as a fellow of the International Society for Optics and Photonics (SPIE) and a senior member of IEEE. Additionally, he has been invited to serve as an associate editor for several special issues on optical wireless communication for IEEE and OSA.

He served for many years on the university Supreme Committee for Academic Appointment of Medical Doctors.

Over the past decade, he has been academically responsible for the final engineering projects program of 4th-year students, overseeing around 100 projects annually in the School of Electrical Engineering.

Since 2017, he has led the University Quantum Center, fostering an environment of innovation and discovery.

He has been a member of the university's professor union since 2020, and has served two terms at the University senate, the last one from 2020 to 2023. For almost a decade, he has been a part of the faculty of engineering science committee that invites visiting scientists from abroad. Over the years, he has been a member of multiple School of Electrical and Computer Engineering and the faculty of engineering science committees.

He consults in his expertise area to hi-tech industry for many years. In 2021, he co-founded DOTS, a company that develops real-time nitrate monitoring solutions for agricultural soils. As the company's Chief Scientific Officer, Arnon leverages his expertise in engineering and environmental monitoring to create an innovative electro optics core which was an essential subsystem of the company’s product.

== Research ==
In recent years, he has focused on pressing global issues such as health, climate change, and environmental concerns. As such he is the initiate and coordinator (2019-2023) a FET (future and emerging technology) European project called "cancer scan," which utilizes light to detect breast cancer. He was also a co-developer of a technology to address excessive fertilization in agriculture, a problem that has negative impacts on groundwater, atmosphere, and fruit and vegetable prices. In his current research, he continues to utilize optics, physics, communication, and artificial intelligence to develop technology that addresses crucial global issues.

Arnon's research contributions include wireless, satellite, and optical communication, biomedical applications, free space optics, visible light communication, quantum key distribution systems, artificial intelligence, deep learning, and optical technologies for environmental monitoring.

== Outreach ==
Arnon played a role in advising and contributing in the area of communication and engineering science to the establishment of the science museum in Be'er Sheva, and actively volunteered for several years in various educational activities within his city. He also volunteered as a member of his city's earthquake rescue units.

== Selected publications ==
Books

- Nathan Blaunstein, Shlomi Arnon, Natan Kopeika, A. Zilberman, "Applied Aspects of Optical Communication and LIDAR," (Taylor & Francis/ CRC - Auerbach Publication), 2009.
- Shlomi Arnon, George K. Karagiannidis, John R. Barry, Robert Schober, and Murat Uysal, Eds., “Advanced optical wireless communications,” (Cambridge university press), April 2012.
- Shlomi Arnon, ed. Visible light communication. Cambridge University Press, 2015.

Articles

- Balasubramaniam, Ganesh M., Netanel Biton, and Shlomi Arnon. "Imaging through diffuse media using multi-mode vortex beams and deep learning." Scientific Reports 12, no. 1 (2022): 1561.
- Arnon, Shlomi. "Effects of atmospheric turbulence and building sway on optical wireless-communication systems." Optics letters 28, no. 2 (2003): 129-131.
- Kedar, Debbie, and Shlomi Arnon. "Urban optical wireless communication networks: the main challenges and possible solutions." IEEE Communications Magazine 42, no. 5 (2004): S2-S7.
- Arnon, Shlomi. "Underwater optical wireless communication network." Optical Engineering 49, no. 1 (2010): 015001-015001.
- Bykhovsky, Dima, and Shlomi Arnon. "Multiple access resource allocation in visible light communication systems." Journal of Lightwave Technology 32, no. 8 (2014): 1594-1600.
- Gabay, Motti, and Shlomi Arnon. "Quantum key distribution by a free-space MIMO system." Journal of lightwave technology 24, no. 8 (2006): 3114.
- Arnon, Shlomi, and Moti Fridman. "Data center switch based on temporal cloaking." Journal of lightwave technology 30, no. 21 (2012): 3427-3433.
- Gil, Yotam, Nadav Rotter, and Shlomi Arnon. "Feasibility of retroreflective transdermal optical wireless communication." Applied optics 51, no. 18 (2012): 4232-4239.
- Arnon, Shlomi. "Use of satellite natural vibrations to improve performance of free-space satellite laser communication." Applied optics 37, no. 21 (1998): 5031-5036.
- Arnon, Shlomi. "The effect of clock jitter in visible light communication applications." journal of Lightwave Technology 30, no. 21 (2012): 3434-3439.
- Biton, Netanel, Judy Kupferman, and Shlomi Arnon. "OAM light propagation through tissue." Scientific Reports 11, no. 1 (2021): 2407.
- Rachmani, Ronen, and Shlomi Arnon. "Server backplane with optical wavelength diversity links." Journal of lightwave technology 30, no. 9 (2012): 1359-1365.
- Kupferman, Judy, and Shlomi Arnon. "Zero-error attacks on a quantum key distribution FSO system." OSA Continuum 1, no. 3 (2018): 1079-1086.
- Yupiter, Rotem, Shlomi Arnon, Elad Yeshno, Iris Visoly-Fisher, and Ofer Dahan. "Real-time detection of ammonium in soil pore water." npj Clean Water 6, no. 1 (2023): 25.
