= Senator Comstock =

Senator Comstock may refer to:

- Adam Comstock (1740–1819), New York State Senate
- Albert C. Comstock (1845–1910), New York State Senate
- Daniel Webster Comstock (1840–1917), Indiana State Senate
- Horace H. Comstock (died 1861), Michigan State Senate
- John H. Comstock (1904–1993), Nebraska State Senate
- Noah D. Comstock (1832–1890), Michigan State Senate
- Solomon Comstock (1842–1933), Minnesota State Senate
