= David Morrison (astrophysicist) =

American astronomer (born 1940)

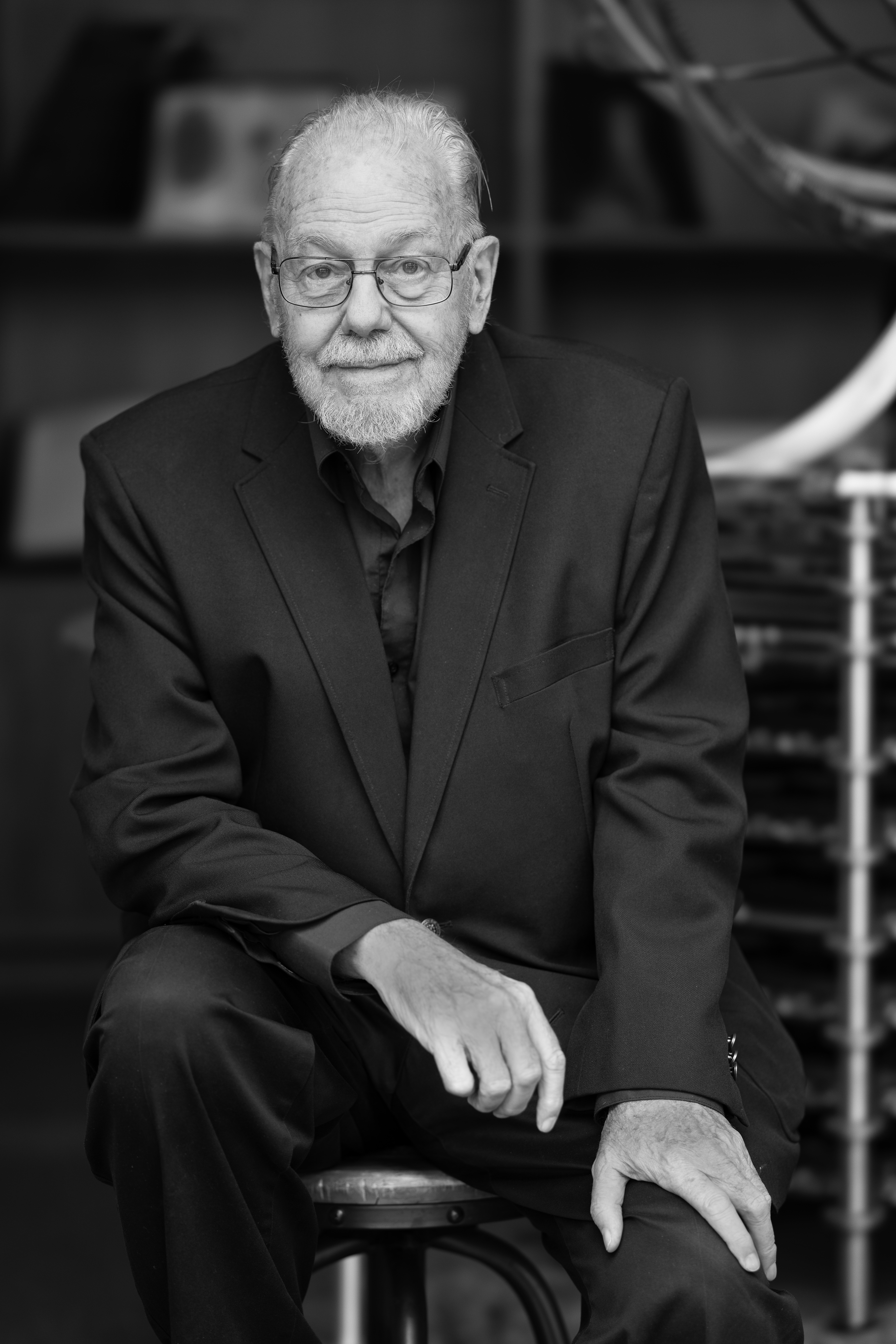
- David Morrison in 2022
- Born: June 26, 1940 (age 86); Danville, Illinois
- Education: Harvard University
- Known for: astrobiology, planetary exploration, search for extraterrestrial life, Near-Earth object detection, defense against asteroids, scientific skepticism
- Awards: Dryden Medal, Sagan Medal, Presidential Meritorious Senior Professional
- Scientific career
- Fields: Planetary science, astrobiology
- Workplaces: NASA Ames Research Center, SETI Institute, NASA Lunar Science Institute, Solar System Exploration Research Virtual Institute

David Morrison (born June 26, 1940) is an American astronomer, a senior scientist at the Solar System Exploration Research Virtual Institute, at NASA Ames Research Center in Mountain View, California. Morrison is the former director of the Carl Sagan Center for Study of Life in the Universe at the SETI Institute and of the NASA Lunar Science Institute. He is the past Director of Space at NASA Ames. Morrison is credited as a founder of the multi-disciplinary field of astrobiology. Morrison is best known for his work in risk assessment of near Earth objects such as asteroids and comets. Asteroid 2410 Morrison was named in his honor. Morrison is also known for his "Ask an Astrobiologist" series on NASA's website where he provides answers to questions submitted by the public. He has published 12 books and over 150 papers primarily on planetary science, astrobiology and near Earth objects.

== Biography ==
David Morrison was born in Danville, Illinois on June 26, 1940. He attended elementary and high school in Danville and graduated from the University of Illinois Urbana-Champaign in 1962. He studied astronomy at Harvard University and received his Ph.D. in 1969, with Carl Sagan as his thesis advisor.

== Astronomical career ==
Morrison was Professor of Astronomy at Institute for Astronomy at the University of Hawaiʻi at Mānoa from 1969 until 1988. He also directed the 3-meter NASA Infrared Telescope Facility of Mauna Kea Observatory and served for two years as University Vice Chancellor for Research. His research accomplishments include demonstration of the uniform high surface temperature of Venus, the discovery that Neptune has a large internal heat source while its “twin” planet Uranus does not, determination of the surface composition of Pluto, first ground-based measurements of the heat flow from Jupiter's volcanic moon Io, discovery of the fundamental division of the asteroids into dark (primitive) and light (stony) classes, and the first quantitative estimate of the cosmic impact hazard. Morrison was also co-chair of the first NASA Astrobiology Roadmap workshop and report.

He served as a science investigator on Mariner, Voyager and Galileo space science missions. He was on the faculty of the Institute for Astronomy at the University of Hawaiʻi at Mānoa from 1969 until 1988, when he joined the senior management staff of NASA Ames Research Center in Mountain View, CA. While on the faculty of the University of Hawaiʻi, Morrison spent two sabbaticals at the Lunar and Planetary Laboratory of the University of Arizona in Tucson, and two assignments in space science management at NASA Headquarters in Washington DC.

David Morrison has held a variety of senior science management positions at NASA Headquarters in Washington and at Ames Research Center in California. In Washington he was the first Program Scientist for the Galileo mission to Jupiter, where he was responsible for defining the mission objectives and recommending the instruments and science investigations that were selected for this mission. He also served as Deputy Associate Administrator for what is now called the NASA Science Mission Directorate. At NASA Ames, he has been Chief of the Space Science Division, Director Space, and most recently the founding Director of the NASA Lunar Science Institute. His responsibilities included the major NASA missions Lunar Pathfinder, Kepler and SOFIA.

== Professional activities ==
Morrison is author of leading college undergraduate texts in astronomy and planetary science. He is a popular public writer and lecturer, promoting a scientific and fact-based perspective about such topics as Emmanuel Velikovsky's pseudocosmology, the evolution-creationist conflict, climate change denialism, and the 2012 doomsday hoax.

As a science communicator, he frequently debunks myths of mystery planets. In interviews in 2011 and 2017, Morrison explained that he receives five emails a day about a supposed Nibiru cataclysm, an apocalyptic hoax, which he initially expected to be a short-lived phenomenon but which "keeps popping up" and is the subject of an estimated two million websites. He launched a YouTube video about the 2012 hoax telling the public that they have nothing to worry about. The video was briefly featured in the opening credits of the 2013 film World War Z, based on the 2006 novel of the same name.

== Honors ==
Morrison is a Fellow of the American Association for the Advancement of Science, of the California Academy of Sciences, and of the Committee for Skeptical Inquiry; also a supporter (and member of the Advisory Council, since 2013) of the National Center for Science Education. He is also a Scientist Trustee of the California Academy of Sciences.

He has served as Councilor of the American Astronomical Society, Chair of the Division for Planetary Science of the American Astronomical Society, President of the Astronomical Society of the Pacific, Chair of the Astronomy Section of the American Association for the Advancement of Science, and both President of Commission 16 (Planets and Satellites) and of the Working Group on Near Earth Objects of the International Astronomical Union.

Morrison received the Dryden Medal for research of the American Institute of Aeronautics and Astronautics, the Carl Sagan Medal of the American Astronomical Society for public Communication, and the Klumpke-Roberts Award of the Astronomical Society of the Pacific for his contributions to science education. NASA has also awarded him Outstanding Leadership medals twice as well as the Presidential Meritorious Rank.

In 2015, David Morrison received the American Astronomical Society's (AAS) Education Prize in recognition for his outstanding contributions to the education of the public, students and future astronomers.
