= Lynnae Quick =

Planetary geophysicist

Lynnae C. Quick
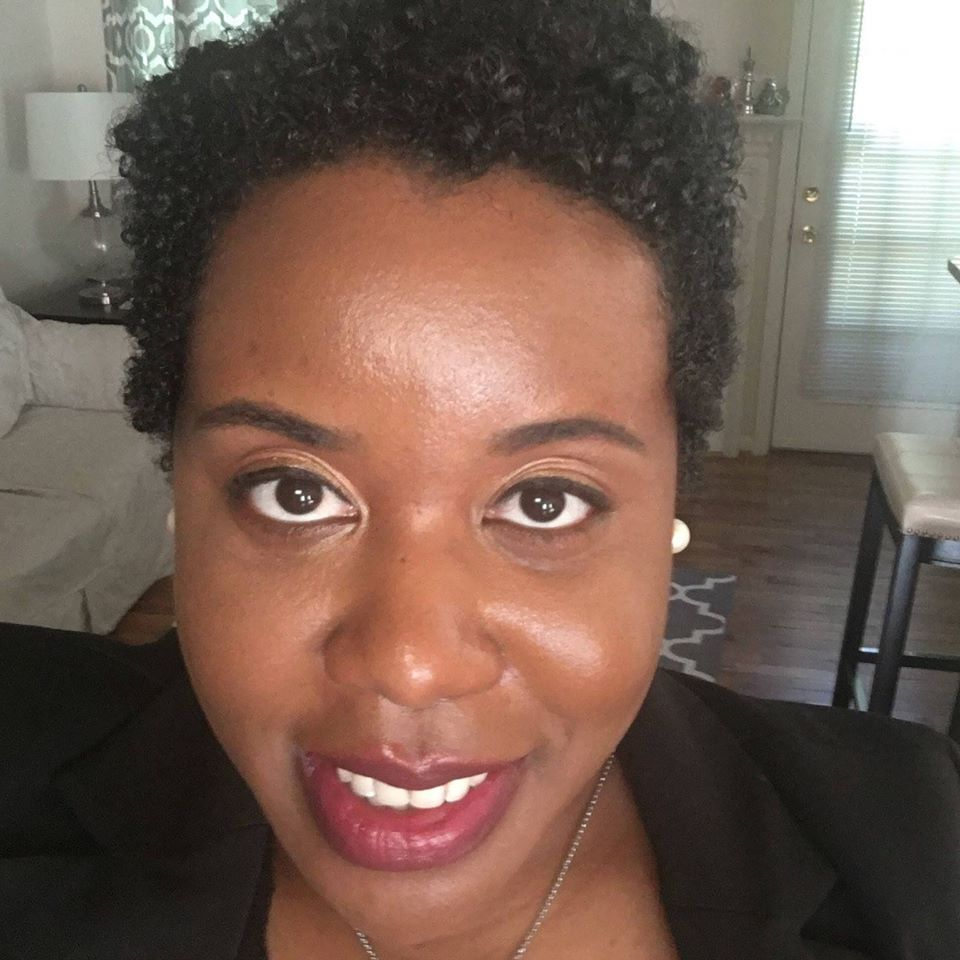
- Born: c. 1984 (age 41–42)
- Education: North Carolina Agricultural and Technical State University, BS; The Catholic University of America, MS; Johns Hopkins University, MA, PhD
- Scientific career
- Fields: Planetary science
- Workplaces: Applied Physics Laboratory; Goddard Space Flight Center
- Thesis: Europa: Cryomagmatic Processes & Cryovolcanic Surface Expressions
- Academic advisors: Bruce D. Marsh, Louise Prockter

Lynnae C. Quick (born c. 1984) is an American planetary geophysicist and Ocean Worlds Planetary Scientist. Her research centers on theoretical modeling of cryovolcanic processes on the icy moons and dwarf planets in the Solar System as well as modeling volcanic activity on Venus and the Moon. Quick is a member of the Dawn, Europa Clipper, and Dragonfly Mission science teams. She was also a member of the NASA Solar System Exploration Research Virtual Institute (SSERVI) Toolbox for Research and Exploration (TREX) team.

== Education ==
Quick was born and raised in Greensboro, North Carolina and graduated from James Benson Dudley High School. In high school, she became interested in astronomy after learning about the death of stars and the creation of supermassive black holes. Her high school physics teacher, John M. Brown, encouraged her interests, suggesting she pursue a post-graduate degree in astronomy or astrophysics, and connected her with astrophysicist Reva Williams who also encouraged her to pursue a Ph.D. Quick received her Bachelor of Science degree in physics from North Carolina Agricultural and Technical State University, graduating summa cum laude. As an undergraduate, she enrolled in a Women in Science course taught by Dr. Benita P. Bell at nearby Bennett College. The course focused on the history and accomplishments of African American women in STEM, included group discussions and presentations on navigating professional STEM spaces, and stressed the importance of taking pride in being a woman in science. As the class was composed solely of African American women who were pursuing undergraduate degrees in the physical and biological sciences, it significantly contributed to Quick's positive growth and development as a young scientist.

While at North Carolina Agricultural and Technical State University, Quick participated in the Research Experiences for Undergraduates and NASA Academy internship programs and pursued research at the National Radio Astronomy Observatory and at NASA's Goddard Space Flight Center, respectively. There, she became interested in characterizing exoplanets and in planetary geology. After graduating, she followed this interest to an internship at the Applied Physics Laboratory, with encouragement from astrophysicist Beth A. Brown. There, she spent the summer studying Europa, one of Jupiter's moons.

Quick then attended The Catholic University of America in Washington, D.C., where she received her Master of Science in physics with a concentration in astrophysics. There, she pursued research at both the Applied Physics Laboratory, with mentorship from Louise Prockter, and at Goddard Space Flight Center. Quick received her Doctor of Philosophy from Johns Hopkins University in 2013. While there she was advised by igneous petrologist Bruce D. Marsh and was a Bromery Fellow and an APL Graduate Fellow. Quick specialized in planetary magmatism and volcanology, and her dissertation was entitled Europa: Cryomagmatic Processes & Cryovolcanic Surface Expressions. As a Bromery Fellowship recipient, Quick met geologist and Tuskegee Airman Dr. Randolph Bromery while pursuing her Ph.D.

== Career ==
After completing her doctoral degree, Quick became a NASA Postdoctoral Program (NPP) Fellow at Goddard Space Flight Center, studying volcanic domes on Venus and Europa, and later expanding her research to include studying cryovolcanic activity on Saturn's moon Enceladus. During that time, she became a co-investigator on the Europa Imaging System, conducting analyses on the moon's geyser-like plumes and beginning her work as a team member on NASA's Europa Clipper mission. Both Europa and Enceladus shoot water through their plumes, which is evidence of an ocean that lies below their icy surfaces. Quick's postdoctoral work centered on characterizing these geologic processes and understanding how they differ across planets and satellites.

Following her postdoctoral fellowship, Quick worked as a research scientist at the Planetary Science Institute. She then became a staff scientist at the Smithsonian Institution's Center for Earth and Planetary Studies, making her the first African American staff scientist in the center's history. In 2019, Quick joined NASA's Goddard Space Flight Center as an Ocean Worlds Planetary Scientist, specializing in the study of ocean worlds in the Solar System and beyond. Quick continues her research program studying cryovolcanic activity and other geophysical processes on moons and planets in the Solar System and has expanded that work to study activity in extrasolar planetary systems. She has also applied her expertise to characterizing the surface of the crater-laden dwarf planet Ceres, located in our solar system's asteroid belt. Ceres is thought to have once had a global ocean, which is hypothesized to have slowly frozen over time. Quick and her colleagues have found evidence to support this hypothesis, analyzing patterns of spots of varying brightness across Ceres surface, which correspond to pockets of brine under the asteroid's surface that have been exposed by craters. Quick undertook this work as an Associate Scientist on NASA's Dawn Mission. and was the first to model the movement of material from a deep brine reservoir in Ceres’ interior to its emplacement as bright spots via eruptions at Ceres' surface.

In 2020, Quick was the lead author on a NASA study that analyzed 53 terrestrial exoplanets that were all of a similar size to Earth. She mathematically modeled the geologic activity of these planets by estimating their internal heating rates as a proxy for potential volcanic activity. She and her team compared these estimates, as well as considerations like density and temperature, to Earth as well as Enceladus and Europa, which are known to be ocean worlds, containing significant amounts of water beneath their surfaces. They found that all 53 exoplanets likely have volcanic activity and that more than a quarter of these exoplanets could be ocean worlds — and could thus potentially sustain extraterrestrial life. Future missions, such as the James Webb Space Telescope, can make more observations of these exoplanets to better understand their geologic activity and look for signs of life. In addition to continuing her work as a team member on NASA's Europa Clipper Mission, Quick is also a science team member and Program Coordinator for the Student and Early Career Investigator Program on NASA's Dragonfly mission to Titan.

== Awards and honors ==
In 2013, after completing her PhD, she received a NASA Postdoctoral Program Fellowship award. In 2021, asteroid 37349 was named Lynnaequick in her honor. Quick was the 2021 recipient of the American Astronomical Society's Division for Planetary Sciences Harold C. Urey Prize, which is the highest honor for young planetary scientists. The Urey Prize recognizes outstanding achievement in planetary research by an early career scientist. She also received the 2021 Alumni Achievement Award from North Carolina A&T State University’s College of Science and Technology.

== Personal ==
Quick is a third-generation graduate of North Carolina A&T State University. She and her husband, Lamar, live near Washington, DC.

== Select publications ==
- Quick, Lynnae C.; Roberge, Aki; Barr Mlinar, Amy; Hedman, Matthew M. (2020-06-18). "Forecasting Rates of Volcanic Activity on Terrestrial Exoplanets and Implications for Cryovolcanic Activity on Extrasolar Ocean Worlds". Publications of the Astronomical Society of the Pacific. 132 (1014): 084402. Bibcode:2020PASP..132h4402Q. doi:10.1088/1538-3873/ab9504. S2CID 219964895.
- Quick, Lynnae C.; Glaze, Lori S.; Baloga, Stephen M. (2017-03-01). "Cryovolcanic Emplacement of Domes on Europa". Icarus. 284: 477–488. Bibcode:2017Icar..284..477Q. doi:10.1016/j.icarus.2016.06.029.
- Quick, Lynnae C.; Marsh, Bruce D. (2016-06-01). "Heat Transfer of Ascending Cryomagma on Europa". Journal of Volcanology and Geothermal Research. 319: 66–77. Bibcode:2016JVGR..319...66Q. doi:10.1016/j.jvolgeores.2016.03.018.
- Quick, Lynnae C.; Glaze, Lori S.; Baloga, Stephen M.; Stofan, Ellen R. (2016-06-01). "New Approaches to Inferences for Steep-Sided Domes on Venus". Journal of Volcanology and Geothermal Research. 319: 93–105. Bibcode:2016JVGR..319...93Q. doi:10.1016/j.jvolgeores.2016.02.028.
- Quick, Lynnae C.; Barnouin, Olivier S.; Prockter, Louise; Patterson, G. Wesley (2013-09-15). "Constraints on the Detection of Cryovolcanic Plumes on Europa". Planetary and Space Science. 86: 1–9. Bibcode:2013P&SS...86....1Q. doi:10.1016/j.pss.2013.06.028.
