= Britt =

Britt may refer to:

== Places ==
- Britt, Iowa, United States
- Britt, Minnesota, United States
- Britt, Ontario, Canada
- Britt Peak, Marie Byrd Land, Antarctica
- Britt Township, Hancock County, Iowa, United States

== Other uses ==
- Britt (actress) (1946–2025), Swedish actress, TV producer and author
- Britt (name), a list of people and fictional characters with either the given name or surname
- Britt Airways, a commuter airline that became Continental Express carrier ExpressJet Airlines
- Britt's Department Store, an American store chain from 1962 to 1982
- Britt Festival, a performing arts festival in southern Oregon
- SS Britt, a Swedish cargo ship
- The Britt, formerly Sutton Place Hotel Toronto

== See also ==
- Café Britt, a Costa Rican coffee roasting and chocolate manufacturing company
- Brit (disambiguation)
