= Thomas H. Adams =

American politician (1904–1957)

Member of the Nebraska Legislature from the 19th district
- In office January 4, 1955 – January 1, 1957
- Preceded by: Fay Britt
- Succeeded by: Stanley Portsche
- In office January 2, 1945 – January 6, 1953
- Preceded by: George Craven
- Succeeded by: Howard Britt

Personal details
- Born: September 25, 1904 Wisner, Nebraska
- Died: March 23, 1957 (aged 52) Lincoln, Nebraska
- Party: Republican
- Spouse: Vera Berkheimer (m. 1924)
- Children: 2
- Education: Wayne State Teachers College (A.B.); University of Nebraska (M.A., LL.B.)
- Occupation: School superintendent, attorney, law professor

Thomas H. Adams (September 25, 1904 – March 23, 1957) was a Republican politician from Nebraska who served as a member of the Nebraska Legislature from the 19th district from 1945 to 1953 and again from 1955 to 1957.

== Early life ==
Adams was born in Wisner, Nebraska, in 1904, to parents who had immigrated to the United States from Wales in 1895. He graduated from the Wayne State Teachers College in 1930 with his bachelor's degree, and then attended the University of Nebraska, receiving his master's degree in school administration in 1936 and master of laws in 1938. Adams served as the superintendent of public schools in Cairo, Dixon, and Verdigre, and worked as the director of legal research for the state Superintendent of Public Instruction from 1943 to 1944. He taught at the University of Nebraska College of Law during the summer sessions beginning in 1944.

== Nebraska Legislature ==
In 1942, State Senator Jack Price declined to seek re-election, and Adams ran to succeed him in the 19th district, which was based in Lancaster County. In the nonpartisan primary, Adams faced auto dealer Howard Britt, and former State Senator George Craven, and attorney George Milliken. In the primary election, Craven placed first, winning 48 percent of the vote to Adams's 25 percent, Britt's 15 percent, and Milliken's 12 percent. Craven and Adams advanced to the general election, which Craven narrowly won, 51–49 percent.

Craven declined to seek another term in 1944, and Adams ran to succeed him. He ran in a crowded primary, and faced Britt, Lincoln City Councilman Rees Wilkinson, former State Representative James Lundy, machinist Joseph Charles Dale, and Harry Easton. Wilkinson placed first in the primary election, winning 41 percent of the vote, and Adams narrowly won second place, receiving 19 percent of the vote to Britt's 16 percent and Lundy's 12 percent. In the general election, Wilkinson originally led Adams, but after the absentee ballots were tallied, Adams narrowly defeated Wilkinson, winning 50.2 to Wilkinson's 49.8 percent, a difference of 36 votes.

As the 1945 legislature convened, Wilkinson's attorney, Anton Jensen, filed an election contest with the state legislature, arguing that Adams, as an employee of the state Superintendent of Public Instruction, was constitutionally barred from serving in the state legislature, and seeking a recount, citing the close vote. After it received the contest, the Committee on Credentials recommended conducting a full recount, which the legislature approved only by a 21–17 vote following an hour-long debate, with senators in opposition arguing, "If we grant a recount on request, merely because there was a close vote, we may be flooded with such requests[.]" The recount increased Adams's margin of victory to 46 votes, and on January 16, the legislature voted to reject the contest by a 38–1 vote.

Adams ran for re-election in 1946, and was challenged by Britt, Dale, and Wilkinson, in a rematch of the 1944 campaign. Wilkinson placed first in the primary, receiving 41 percent of the vote, and Adams placed second with 37 percent. Adams and Wilkinson proceeded to the general election, Adams defeated Wilkinson by a wider margin than the 1944 election, receiving 56 percent of the vote to Wilkinson's vote, and Wilkinson conceded defeat.

In 1948, Adams ran for re-election to a third term, and was challenged by former State Representative B. S. Keck, machinist Joseph Dale, and Anna Yokel, one of the first women to run in a state legislative election. Adams placed first in the primary election by a wide margin, receiving 65 percent of the vote to Dale's 16 percent. In the primary election, Adams was elected as a 19th legislative district delegate to the Nebraska Republican Party convention. In the general election, Adams defeated Dale in a landslide, winning 69–31 percent.

Adams ran for a fourth term in 1950, and was challenged by Edward L. Witte Jr., an investigator. Adams placed first over Witte in the primary election, winning 71 percent of the vote to Witte's 29 percent. In the general election, Adams defeated Witte by a wide margin, receiving 70 percent of the vote to Witt's 30 percent.

In 1952, Adams ran for a fifth term, and was challenged by Howard Britt, a former auto dealer who had run in 1942, 1944, and 1946, and insurance agent F. M. Stapleton. Adams placed first in the primary election, winning 54 percent of the vote to Britt's 30 percent, and they advanced to the general election. Britt defeated Adams by a narrow margin, winning 53–47 percent.

Britt died less than one year into his term, and in 1954, Adams ran to succeed him. Though Governor Robert Crosby originally planned to leave Britt's seat vacant, when a special legislative session was convened, he appointed Britt's widow, Fay Britt, to serve out the remaining months of his term. Britt declined to run for a full term, and Adams faced Witte, his 1950 opponent, and attorney Leo Bartunek in the primary election. Adams placed first by a wide margin, winning 57 percent of the vote. Bartunek narrowly placed second, defeating Witte by 20 votes. Adams defeated Bartunek by a wide margin, receiving 62 percent of the vote to Bartunek's 38 percent.

In 1956, Adams ran for a sixth term. He was challenged by real estate broker Stanley Portsche, factory manager C. V. Keller, and Louis Hector. Portsche placed first in the primary, winning 35 percent of the vote to Adams's 32 percent and Keller's 29 percent. Portsche and Adams advanced to the general election, but on September 24, 1956, Adams dropped out of the race, citing ill health, and was replaced on the ballot by Keller.

== Death ==
Adams died on March 23, 1957.
