= Louise Prockter =

Planetary scientist

- Louise Prockter
- Born: 1964 (age 61–62)
- Education: Lancaster University; Brown University
- Known for: Planetary geology
- Scientific career
- Fields: Planetary geology Geophysics; Remote Sensing
- Workplaces: Johns Hopkins University Applied Physics Laboratory; Universities Space Research Association; Lunar and Planetary Institute
- Doctoral advisor: James W. Head
- Notable students: Lynnae Quick

Louise Prockter is a planetary scientist who became director of NASA's Planetary Science Division in April 2025. Her research focuses on the geomorphology and structural geology of icy satellites, particularly Europa, Ganymede and Triton. She previously served as Chief Scientist of the Space Exploration Sector at the Johns Hopkins University Applied Physics Laboratory (APL) and as director of the Lunar and Planetary Institute (LPI). She was the first woman to serve as LPI Director and led the LPI from 2016 to 2020.

== Education ==
Prockter earned a bachelor's degree in geophysics from Lancaster University in England and a master's degree and doctorate in planetary geology from Brown University. Before entering science, she worked in sales and marketing.

== Career ==
Prockter worked as an imaging team associate on the Galileo and Near Earth Asteroid Rendezvous (NEAR) missions. On the MESSENGER mission to Mercury, she served as instrument scientist for the Mercury Dual Imaging System, co-investigator and deputy project scientist. She also served as deputy project scientist for Europa Clipper and subsequently as a co-investigator on its camera team.

Prockter joined APL as a postdoctoral researcher in 1999, became a member of its senior professional staff in 2001, and became supervisor of its Planetary Exploration Group in 2008. She supervised the group until July 2013 and served as assistant supervisor of APL's Science Branch from July 2013 to August 2016.

In 2014, Prockter and coauthors reported evidence consistent with the subduction of surface ice on Europa, supporting the possibility of plate tectonics within its ice shell.

Prockter directed the Lunar and Planetary Institute from September 2016 to August 2020, before returning to APL as Chief Scientist of its Space Exploration Sector, a position she held from August 2020 to January 2025. From October 2021 to April 2023, she also headed APL's Space Science and Instrumentation Branch.

Prockter served on the Satellites panel of the National Academies' Vision and Voyages planetary science decadal survey and co-chaired its 2018 midterm review. She has also served on NASA's Planetary Science Advisory Committee.

Prockter was principal investigator of Trident, a proposed flyby mission to Neptune's moon Triton. NASA selected Trident as one of four concepts for further study in February 2020. The proposal was not selected for flight development in the 2021 competition.

== Honors ==
Prockter was elected a fellow of the Geological Society of America in 2011. She received the Harold Masursky Award for meritorious service to planetary science from the American Astronomical Society's Division for Planetary Sciences in 2017. In 2024, she delivered the Masursky Lecture at the Lunar and Planetary Science Conference.
