= Marvin Stromer =

American politician (1933–1984)

Member of the Nebraska Legislature
- In office January 3, 1961 – January 13, 1967
- Preceded by: Stanley Portsche
- Succeeded by: William Swanson
- Constituency: 19th district (1961–1965); 27th district (1965–1967)

Personal details
- Born: November 22, 1933 Hastings, Nebraska
- Died: 1984 (aged 50–51)
- Party: Republican
- Spouse: Peggy Larson (m. 1956; div. 1983)
- Children: 2
- Education: University of Nebraska (A.B., M.A., Ph.D.)
- Occupation: Political science professor

Military service
- Allegiance: United States
- Branch/service: United States Army
- Years of service: 1955–1957
- Unit: Counterintelligence Corps

Marvin E. Stromer (November 22, 1933 – 1984) was an American Republican politician from Nebraska and political science professor who served as a member of the Nebraska Legislature from 1961 to 1967.

== Early life and career ==
Stromer was born in Hastings, Nebraska, in 1933, and graduated from Hastings High School. He subsequently attended the University of Nebraska, receiving his bachelor's degree in 1955. Stromer worked on the staff of Secretary of the Interior Fred A. Seaton, and was stationed in Stuttgart, West Germany, while he served in the U.S. Army Counterintelligence Corps from 1955 to 1957.

Stromer continued his studies in political science, completing his master's degree in 1962 with his thesis titled "Congressional Redistricting in Nebraska 1961." He received his doctorate in political science in 1966 with his thesis: "The Making of a Political Leader: Kenneth S. Wherry and the United States Senate," which he later published as a book. Stromer was subsequently hired as an assistant professor of political science at Hiram Scott College in Scottsbluff, Nebraska.

== Nebraska Legislature ==
In 1960, Stromer announced that he would run for the Nebraska Legislature from the 19th district, which was represented by State Senator Stanley Portsche. Portsche subsequently announced that he would not seek re-election "[d]ue to financial and personal reasons, business and other commitments," and Stromer faced real estate agent Clarence Keller, watchmaker C. O. Blanchard, packing company worker Robert Winslow, and perennial candidate Louis Hector in the nonpartisan primary. Stromer placed first in the primary, winning 40 percent of the vote, and advanced to the general election with Blanchard, who placed second with 28 percent. Stromer defeated Blanchard in the general election with 56 percent of the vote.

Stromer ran for re-election in 1962, and was challenged by Victor Gruenemeier, the owner of a Lincoln motel and president of the Lincoln Motel Association. Stromer placed first over Gruenemeier in the primary, winning 65 percent of the vote. Gruenemeier subsequently withdrew from the race, and Stromer was re-elected unopposed.

Following redistricting, Stromer ran for re-election in the 27th district in 1964. He was challenged by Lawson Chadwick, a brakeman for the Chicago, Burlington and Quincy Railroad. Stromer won 73 percent of the vote in the primary election to Chadwick's 27 percent, and defeated him in the general election with 69 percent of the vote.

In 1966, after Stromer was hired at Hiram Scott College in Scottsbluff, he planned to commute to the campus while maintaining his residence in Lincoln and serving in the legislature. However, on January 11, 1967, Stromer announced that he would resign from the legislature.

== Post-legislative career ==
Stromer taught at Hiram Scott until 1971, when he announced that he would resign from the college, criticizing it as offering a "mischievious type of education." He moved to Ladysmith, Wisconsin, to teach at Mount Senario College, and was later hired as the dean of Milton College in 1973. In 1977, Stromer was indicted over an alleged scheme to defraud the Veterans' Administration by falsely certifying that veterans in Rockford were students at the school. He pleaded no contest to the charges in 1979, and was sentenced to probation.

== Death ==
Stromer died in 1984, at the age of 50–51.
