= Stanley Portsche =

American politician (1924–2014)

Member of the Nebraska Legislature from the 19th district
- In office January 1, 1957 – January 3, 1961
- Preceded by: Thomas H. Adams
- Succeeded by: Marvin Stromer

Personal details
- Born: February 25, 1924 Lincoln, Nebraska
- Died: March 31, 2014 (aged 90) Lincoln, Nebraska
- Party: Republican
- Spouse: Aileen Znamenacek (m. 1951)
- Children: 3
- Education: Cornell College; University of Colorado; Saint Mary's College of California; University of Nebraska (B.S.)
- Occupation: Real estate broker

Military service
- Allegiance: United States
- Branch/service: United States Navy; Nebraska National Guard
- Years of service: 1942–1946 (Navy); 1951–1955 (National Guard)

Stanley Lee Portsche (February 25, 1924 – March 31, 2014) was a Republican politician from Nebraska who served as a member of the Nebraska Legislature from the 19th district from 1957 to 1961.

== Early life ==
Portsche was born in Lincoln, Nebraska, in 1924. He attended Lincoln Public Schools and served in the United States Navy during World War II as a Naval Air Force Cadet. Portsche attended Cornell College, University of Colorado, and Saint Mary's College of California, and graduated from the University of Nebraska with his bachelor's degree in business administration in 1950. He served in the Nebraska National Guard from 1951 to 1955, and worked as a real estate broker.

== Nebraska Legislature ==
In 1956, Portsche ran for the Nebraska Legislature from the 19th district, challenging incumbent State Senator Thomas H. Adams for re-election. In the nonpartisan primary, Portsche placed first, receiving 35 percent of the vote to Adams's 32 percent and factory manager Clarence Keller's 29 percent. On September 24, 1956, Adams dropped out of the race, citing his ill health, and was automatically replaced on the ballot by Keller. Portsche defeated Keller with 57 percent of the vote.

Portsche ran for re-election in 1958, and was challenged by Keller and attorney Leo Bartunek. In the primary election, Portsche placed first with 39 percent of the vote, and advanced to the general election with Bartunek, who received 32 percent. In the general election, Portsche defeated Bartunek with 58 percent of the vote.

He declined to run for re-election in 1960, citing "financial and personal reasons, business and other commitments."

== Post-legislative career ==
After leaving the legislature, he continued working as a real estate broker, and was named Nebraska Realtor of the Year in 1974 by the Nebraska Realtors Association.

In 1986, Portsche announced that he would run for Lancaster County Register of Deeds, challenging incumbent Democrat Dan Nolte. Nolte defeated Portsche, winning re-election with 59 percent of the vote.

== Death ==
Portsche died on March 31, 2014.
