= Lunar and Planetary Institute =

American research institute in Houston

- Established: 1969
- Address: 3600 Bay Area Blvd.
- Location: Houston, Texas, US
- Coordinates: 29°35′16.7″N 95°06′03.3″W
- Interactive map of Lunar and Planetary Institute
- Website: www.lpi.usra.edu

The Lunar and Planetary Institute (LPI) is a scientific research institute dedicated to study of the Solar System, its formation, evolution, and current state. The Institute is part of the Universities Space Research Association (USRA) and is supported by the Science Mission Directorate of the National Aeronautics and Space Administration (NASA). Located at 3600 Bay Area Boulevard in Houston, Texas, the Institute serves as a scientific forum attracting visiting scientists, postdoctoral fellows, students, and resident experts; supports and serves the research community through newsletters, meetings, and other activities; collects and disseminates planetary data while facilitating the community's access to NASA astromaterials samples and facilities; engages and excites the public about space science; and invests in the development of future generations of scientists. The LPI sponsors and organizes several workshops and conferences throughout the year, including the Lunar and Planetary Science Conference (LPSC) held in March in the Houston area.

== History ==
In his March 1968 speech at the Manned Spacecraft Center (MSC) in Houston, Texas, President Lyndon B. Johnson announced the formation of the Lunar Science Institute (LSI).

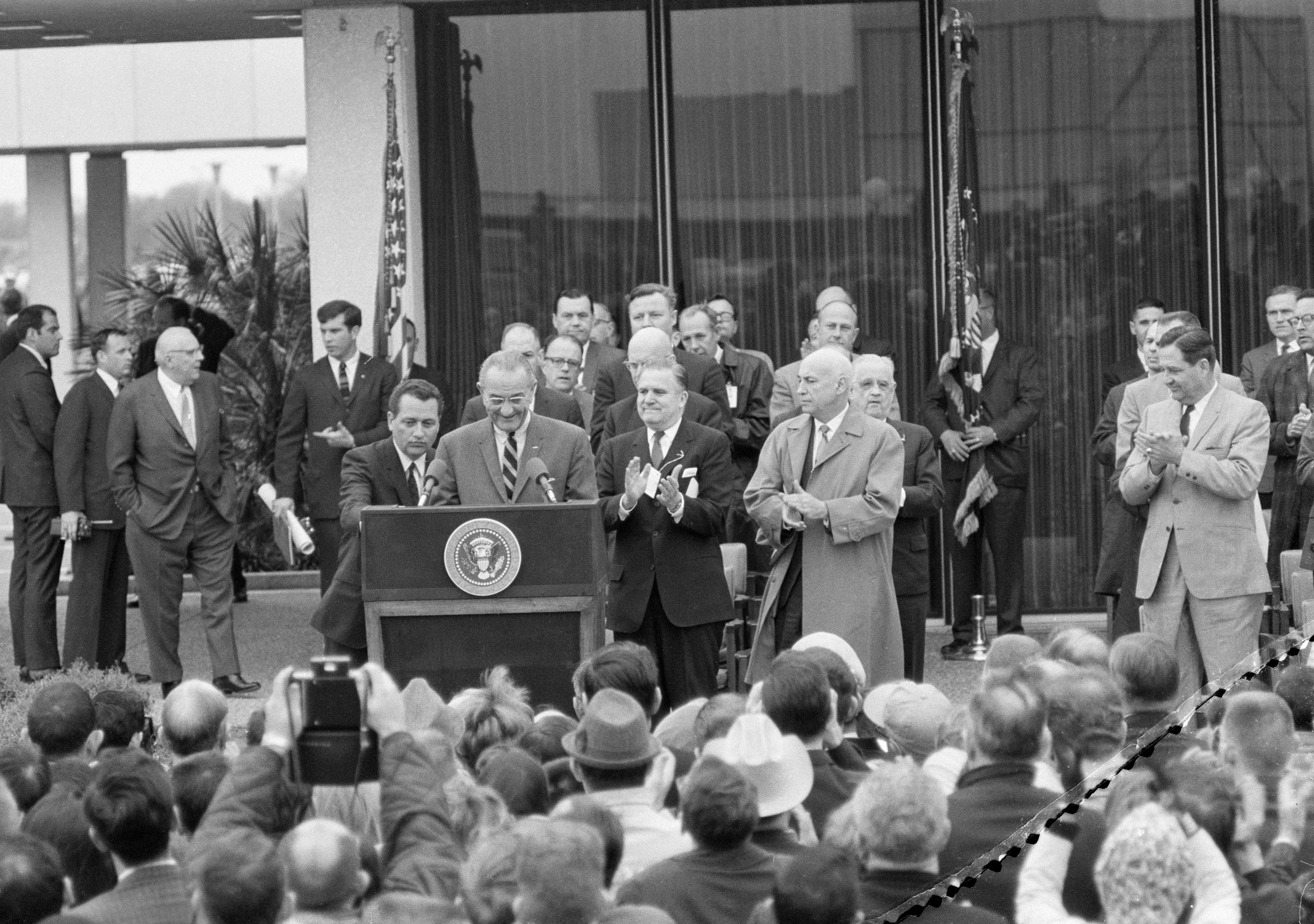
President Lyndon Johnson at Manned Spacecraft Center in 1968

"We will welcome here all who are interested in the sciences of space. We will strengthen the cooperation between NASA and our universities. And we will set new patterns of scientific cooperation which will have profound effects on man's knowledge of his universe." -- President Lyndon B. Johnson, March 1, 1968

"The institute will provide a base for outside scientists, encouraging them to visit the Manned Spacecraft Center and use its laboratories, lunar photographs, and (ultimately) its rock samples. LSI is viewed as a major potential stimulus to lunar science at MSC and elsewhere."

This announcement was the culmination of meetings and events involving NASA, the National Academy of Sciences, Universities Research Association (a university consortium founded to run what became Fermilab) and several major universities. Initially operated by the National Academy of Sciences, USRA, a newly-formed university consortium, took over the management of the Lunar Science Institute on December 11, 1969.

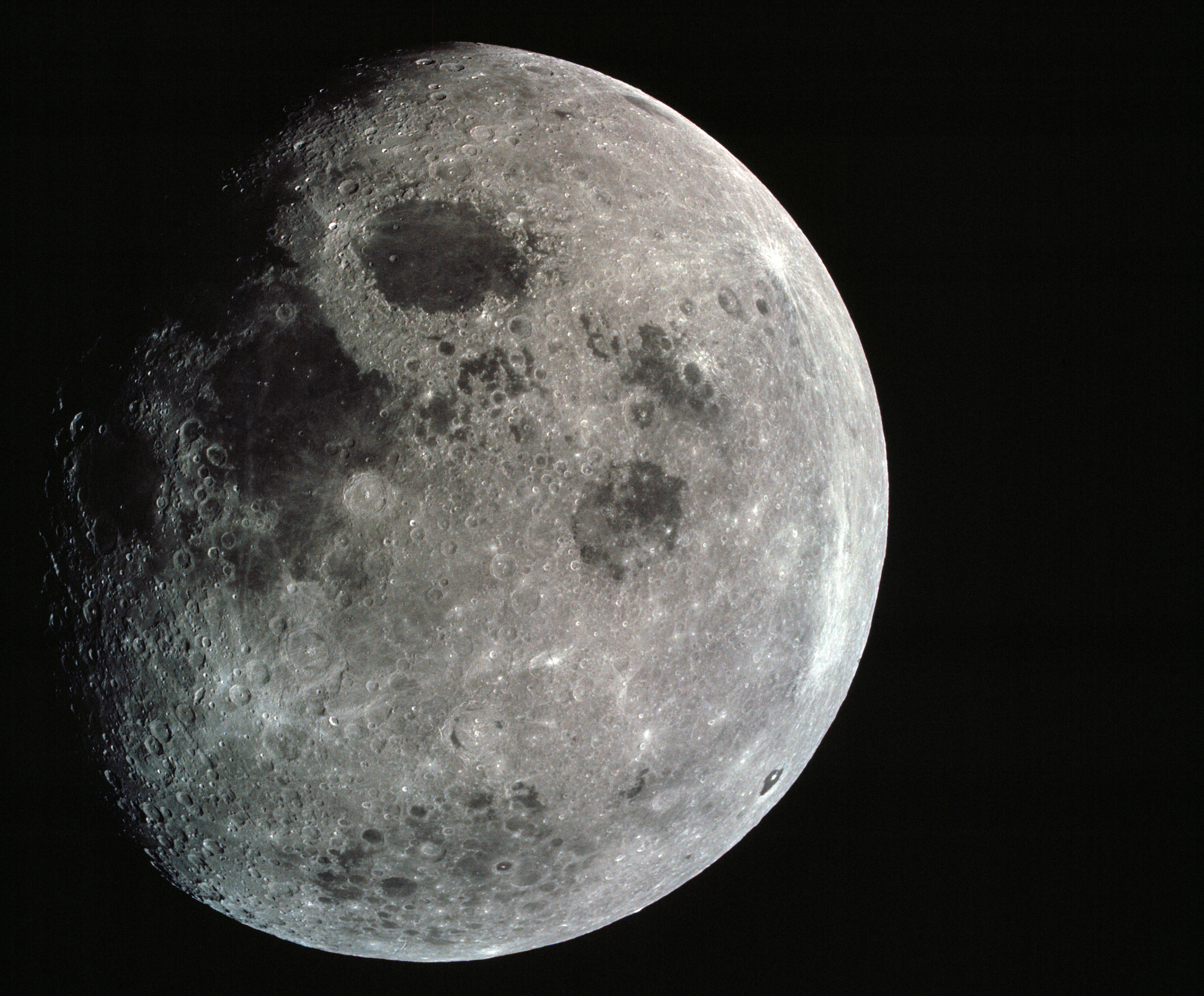
Moon from Apollo 8, December 22, 1968

William W. Rubey was appointed the first director of the Lunar Science Institute. Rubey led the institute through the transition to the new management operation under USRA. A program of visiting university-based scientists was established, the first symposium was organized, and the first lecture of the LSI seminar series was presented. The Lunar Science Institute was formally dedicated on January 4, 1970, at the former West Mansion on NASA Road 1 near the Manned Spacecraft Center.

Thomas R. McGetchin was appointed director in 1977. Under his leadership, McGetchin expanded the focus of the Lunar Science Institute to include the study of the entire Solar System, and the name was changed to the Lunar and Planetary Institute.

In 1991, under the leadership of David C. Black, the LPI moved into a new facility. This new building combined several USRA divisions and operations into one location. The building, dedicated in January 1992, provided more office, meeting, computer and library space and improved USRA-Houston operations.

== Science ==
=== General focus ===
Research topics of the LPI include the formation and evolution of the Solar System, petrology and geochemistry of planetary materials and volatiles, planetary interiors, volcanism, tectonism, impact cratering, and planetary sample science. Research interests range from Mercury to Pluto and the icy moons of the Solar System.

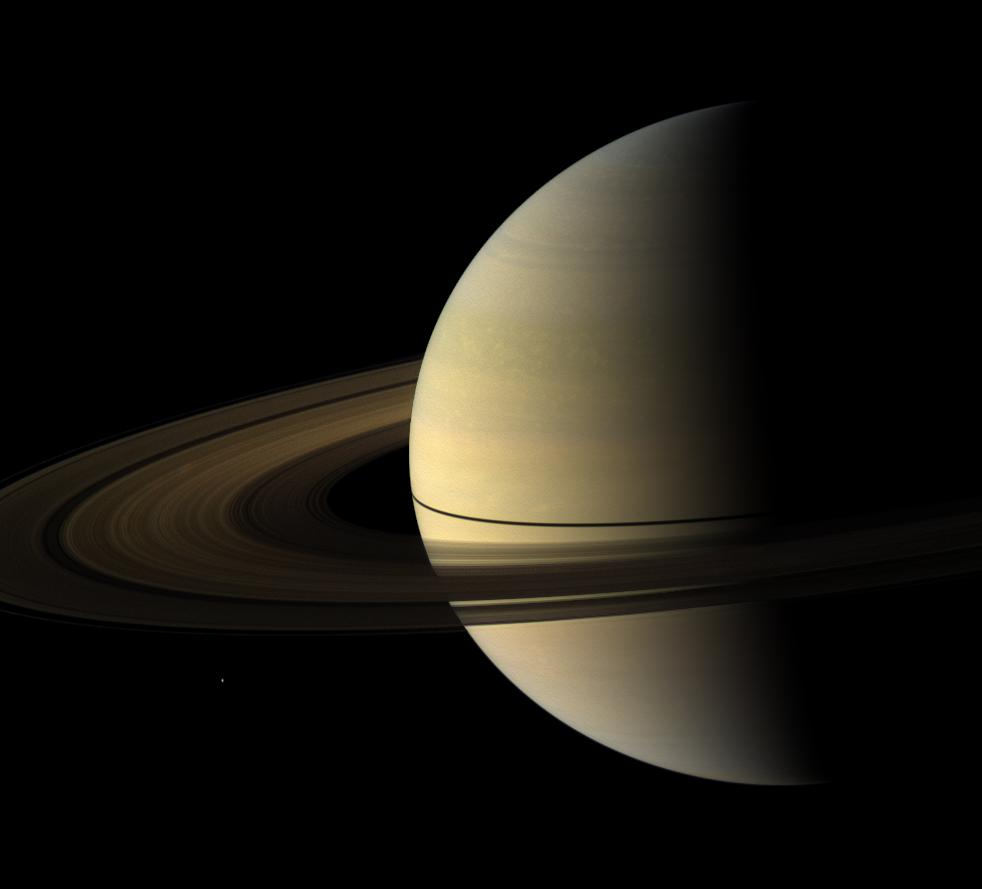
Saturn from the Cassini Orbiter

The LPI serves a scientific forum attracting world-class visiting scientists, postdoctoral fellows, students, and resident experts. Resident scientists provide planetary science expertise necessary for the LPI to achieve its goals and maintain their scientific proficiency through peer-reviewed activities. The research carried out at the LPI supports NASA's efforts to explore the Solar System.

The Center for Lunar Science and Exploration, a collaborative effort of the Lunar and Planetary Institute and the Johnson Space Center and an integral part of the Solar System Exploration Research Virtual Institute (SSERVI) (formerly the NASA Lunar Science Institute), was established in 2009. The Center is designed to develop a core, multi-institutional lunar science program, provide scientific and technical expertise to NASA, support the development of a lunar science community, and develop lunar science education and outreach programs.

=== Analysis groups ===
The LPI provided logistical support for a number of NASA's community analysis groups, including:

Extraterrestrial Materials Analysis Group (ExMAG) - responsible for the collection, curation, and analysis of extraterrestrial samples

Lunar Exploration Analysis Group (LEAG) - responsible for analyzing scientific, technical, commercial, and operational issues associated with lunar exploration in response to requests by NASA

Mapping and Planetary Spatial Infrastructure Team (MAPSIT) - responsible for ensuring that planetary data are usable for any purpose, now and in the future

Mars Exploration Program Analysis Group (MEPAG) - responsible for providing science input for planning and prioritizing future Mars exploration activities for the next several decades

Mercury Exploration Assessment Group (MExAG) - responsible for providing science input and analysis needed to plan and prioritize Mercury research and exploration activities

Outer Planets Assessment Group (OPAG) - responsible for identifying the scientific priorities and pathways for exploration in the outer Solar System

Ocean Worlds Working Group (OWWG) - responsible for bridging planetary science and astrobiology and covering the rich diversity of targets that provide unique opportunities for mission and technology development

Small Bodies Assessment Group (SBAG) - responsible for identifying scientific priorities and opportunities for the exploration of asteroids, comets, interplanetary dust, small satellites, and trans-Neptunian objects and for providing scientific input on the utility of asteroids and comets in support of human space activities

Venus Exploration Analysis Group (VEXAG) - responsible for identifying scientific priorities and strategy for the exploration of Venus

=== Summer intern programs ===
The LPI hosts a Summer Intern Program providing undergraduates an opportunity to participate in cutting-edge research in the planetary sciences. LPI Summer Interns work one-on-one with scientists at the LPI or at the Johnson Space Center to complete research projects of current interest. The Summer Intern Program allows participants to experience a real research environment, to learn from leading planetary scientists, and to preview careers in research.

From 2008 through 2013, the LPI also hosted a Lunar Exploration Summer Intern Program designed to evaluate possible landing sites for robotic and human exploration missions. Interns worked with LPI scientific staff and other collaborators. The program was open to graduate students in geology, planetary science, and related fields, and undergraduates with at least 50 semester hours of credit. In 2015, a new Exploration Science Summer Intern Program was established, building on the success of the previous program, but with a broader scope that includes both the Moon and near-Earth asteroids.

== Meetings ==
The LPI organizes and sponsors a number of planetary science workshops and conferences throughout the year in both domestic and international locations, including the annual Lunar and Planetary Science Conference (LPSC). This important five-day meeting held in the Houston area in March brings together international specialists in petrology, geochemistry, geophysics, geology, and astronomy to present scientific findings in planetary science. The LPSC dates back to the days of the Apollo program and the early meetings focusing on the study of the lunar samples. After over 50 years, this conference continues to thrive, drawing planetary scientists and researchers from around the world.

== Publications ==
The LPI has collaborated on a number of publications in the prestigious Space Science Series of the University of Arizona Press, including Asteroids III (ISBN 0816522812), Comets II (ISBN 0816524505), Europa (ISBN 9780816528448), Meteorites and the Early Solar System II (ISBN 9780816525621), Origin of the Earth and Moon (ISBN 0816520739), Protostars and Planets V (ISBN 9780816526543), The Solar System Beyond Neptune (ISBN 9780816527557), Comparative Climatology of Terrestrial Planets (ISBN 9780816530595), The Pluto System After New Horizons (ISBN 9780816540945), and Comets III (ISBN 9780816553631). The LPI also publishes a large number of planetary science workshop and meeting documents every year. From March 1974 through July 2023, the LPI published the quarterly newsletter, the Lunar Science Information Bulletin, which later became the Lunar and Planetary Information Bulletin. Since June 2014, nineteen lunar and planetary science books, most published by LPI such as Traces of Catastrophe and Lunar Stratigraphy and Sedimentology, have been digitized and made available online.

== Scientist engagement and public outreach ==
The LPI has a long tradition of space science education and public outreach through a number of programs and resources. This effort serves a wide variety of audiences, including informal educators, undergraduate, graduate, and postgraduate students, and the public in informal venues and on local, regional, and national levels.

These programs and resources include the following:

Professional Development - a series of seminars and workshops on topics like communication, networking, career exploration, and more

Explore - a program designed to bring space science into libraries and informal learning environments

Planetary Science News for Students - information and resources for students and early-career researchers in planetary science

Planetary ReaCH - a program that enhances the ability of the planetary science and astrobiology community, aka "Content Heroes," to engage Black and Latinx youth and their families

VIRTEX - a program connecting Boys & Girls Clubs with researchers who study unique extreme environments

Cosmic Explorations: A Speakers Series - a series of free public lectures presented by international experts in space science (past lectures are made available online at the LPI website)

== Library ==
The LPI library contains more than 63,000 cataloged books, documents, maps, films and videos, and print and electronic journals and newsletters. The subject emphasis of the collection is planetary science and geology, with limited collection development extending into the secondary support field of computer science remote sensing. There is an ongoing effort to scan and make available to the scientific community and the general public a number of out-of-print planetary science books, NASA documents and images, and related works. (These publications are copyright-free or made available with permission.)

This collection was a NASA Regional Planetary Image Facility (RPIF) and includes photographs, maps, and other data from planetary missions including Apollo, Lunar Orbiter, Clementine, Mars Pathfinder, Voyager 1, Voyager 2, Magellan, Galileo, and Mars Global Surveyor.

== Directors of the LPI ==
- William Walden Rubey (1968-1971)
- Joseph W. Chamberlain (1971-1973)
- David W. Strangway (1973)
- James W. Head (1973-1974)
- Robert O. Pepin (1974-1977)
- Thomas R. McGetchin (1977-1979)
- John R. Sevier (1979)
- Roger J. Phillips (1979-1982)
- Kevin C. Burke (1982-1988)
- David C. Black (1988-2002)
- Arch M. Reid (2002)
- Stephen J. Mackwell (2002–2016)
- Louise Prockter (2016–2020)
- Lisa Gaddis (2020–2024)
- Walter Kiefer (2024–2026)
- Elsayed Talaat (2026–present)
