= Touch the Invisible Sky =

2007 book

- Author: Noreen Grice, Simon Steel, Doris Daou
- Language: Braille, English
- Published: 2007
- Publisher: Ozone Publishing

Touch the Invisible Sky is a 60-page tactile astronomy book written by astronomy educator Noreen Grice, and astronomers Simon Steel and Doris Daou, and was published in 2007 by Ozone publishing. The book contains colour images alongside Braille and large print descriptions of celestial objects, and colour photographs from the Hubble Space Telescope, Chandra X-Ray Observatory, and Spitzer Space Telescope, amongst others. The pages are overlaid with braille & tactile images embossed in an epoxy layer, in a process known as TechnoBraille, allowing visually impaired readers to feel the images. The images featured include nebulae, stars, galaxies and some of the telescopes used to photograph the celestial objects. The images span a range of wavelengths on the electromagnetic spectrum, with a variety of textures and shapes used to convey the characteristics of the objects. The objects featured include the Sun, the star Eta Carinae, The Crab Nebula, and Kepler's Supernova.

It was partly funded by NASA, who have also funded two other books by Grice, Touch the Universe and Touch the Sun, and by an education grant from the Chandra mission.

We wanted to show that the beauty and complexity of the universe goes far beyond what we can see with our eyes!

— Doris Daou,
