= George Craven (footballer) =

English footballer (born 1917)

Personal information
- Full name: George Craven
- Date of birth: 1917
- Place of birth: York, Yorkshire, England
- Height: 5 ft 11 in (1.80 m)
- Position: Goalkeeper

Senior career*
Years	Team	Apps	(Gls)
- Fishergate Old Boys
1934–1936	York City	3	(0)
Total		3	(0)
- * Club domestic league appearances and goals

George Craven (born 1917, date of death unknown) was an English professional footballer who played as a goalkeeper in the Football League for York City, and in non-League football for Fishergate Old Boys.
