= Eileen Britt =

New Zealand psychologist

Academic background
- Education: University of Waikato, University of Canterbury
- Theses: Solvent abuse in New Zealand: Descriptive data (1986); Enhancing Diabetes Self-Management: Motivational Enhancement Therapy (2008)
- Doctoral advisor: Steve Hudson, Neville M Blampied, Roeline Kuijer, M Peter Moore
- Other advisors: Graeme Field, John Francis Smith, William Temple

Eileen Frances Britt is a New Zealand academic psychologist, and is a full professor at the University of Canterbury, specialising in motivational interviewing.

== Academic career ==
Britt's father was an art teacher, who created murals in collaboration with Māori, including one at the University of Canterbury. Britt says she learned the value of partnership in education from her father. Britt completed a Bachelor of Science degree at the University of Canterbury, which she followed with a Master of Social Science at the University of Waikato, with a thesis titled Solvent abuse in New Zealand: Descriptive data. Britt then completed a PhD titled Enhancing Diabetes Self-Management: Motivational Enhancement Therapy at the University of Canterbury. She also has a postgraduate diploma in clinical psychology and a diploma in the Māori language. Britt practised as a psychologist for fifteen years, before joining the faculty of the University of Canterbury as a clinical educator in psychology in 1999. She was promoted to full professor within the School of Psychology, Speech and Hearing in 2024.

Britt's research focuses on motivational interviewing, a psychological technique which uses "strengths-based guided conversation". Britt partnered with Work and Income New Zealand over 11-years to introduce motivational interviewing techniques for staff working with unemployed people, and has also taught engineering lecturers to use the technique. Britt has researched the use of motivational interviewing in sports coaching, treatment of eating disorders, and in services working with violent offenders.

== Honours and awards ==
In 2022 Britt was awarded the Te Whatu Kairangi award, a national teaching award for tertiary educators.

== Selected works ==
- Eileen Britt; Stephen M Hudson; Blampied, Neville (2004). "Motivational interviewing in health settings: a review". Patient Education and Counseling. 53 (2): 147–155. doi:10.1016/s0738-3991(03)00141-1. PMID 15140454. Wikidata Q35771888.
- Eileen Britt; Blampied, Neville; Stephen M. Hudson (2003). "Motivational interviewing: a review". Australian Psychologist. 38 (3): 193–201. doi:10.1080/00050060310001707207. Wikidata Q124932349.
- Charis Scott; McKinlay, Audrey; Tracey McLellan; Eileen Britt; Randolph Grace; Martin MacFarlane (2014). "A comparison of adult outcomes for males compared to females following pediatric traumatic brain injury". Neuropsychology. 29 (4): 501–508. doi:10.1037/neu0000074. PMID 25495834. Wikidata Q44799389.
- S. Dean; E. Britt; E. Bell; J. Stanley; Collings, Catherine Diane (2016). "Motivational interviewing to enhance adolescent mental health treatment engagement: a randomized clinical trial". Psychological Medicine. 46 (9): 1961–1969. doi:10.1017/s0033291716000568. PMID 27045520. Wikidata Q50220882.
- Eileen Britt; David H. Gleaves (2011). "Measurement and Prediction of Clinical Psychology Students' Satisfaction with Clinical Supervision". The Clinical Supervisor. 30 (2): 172–182. doi:10.1080/07325223.2011.604274. Wikidata Q60047108.
- McIntosh VV; Britt E; Bulik CM (1994). "Cosmetic breast augmentation and eating disorders". The New Zealand Medical Journal. 107 (976): 151–152. PMID 8164900. Wikidata Q52919869.
- Sara Soleymani; Eileen Britt; Mark Wallace-Bell (2018). "Motivational interviewing for enhancing engagement in Intimate Partner Violence (IPV) treatment: A review of the literature". Aggression and Violent Behavior. 40: 119–127. doi:10.1016/j.avb.2018.05.005. Wikidata Q124929349.
