= SS Minna =

1922 Swedish cargo ship

History
- Name: Minna (1922-35); Britt (1935-40); Leba (1940-45); Empire Conavon (1945-47); Baltkon (1947-59)
- Owner: Trelleborgs Ångfartygs Nya Ab (1922-35); Kalmar Rederei (1935-39); Kriegsmarine (1939-40); Leth & Co (1940-45); Ministry or War Transport (1945); Ministry of Transport (1945-47); Konnel Steamship Co Ltd (1947-54); Carlbomska Woking Shipping Co Ltd (1954-59)
- Operator: F Malmros (1922-35); H Jeansson (1935-39); Kriegsmarine (1939-40); Leth & Co (1940-45); Nelkon Steamship Co Ltd (1945-47); John Carlbom & Co Ltd (1947-54); Carlbomska Woking Shipping Co Ltd (1954-59)
- Port of registry: (Sweden) Trelleborg (1922-35); (Sweden) Kalmar (1935-37); (Sweden) Stockholm (1937-39); (Nazi Germany) Stockholm (1939-40); (Nazi Germany) Hamburg (1940-45); (United Kingdom) Hull (1945-59)
- Builder: Nylands Verksted
- Yard number: 261
- Launched: 1922
- In service: March 1922
- Identification: Code Letters KDMV (1922-34); Code Letters SFNE (1934-39); Swedish Official Number 6735 (1922-39)
- Fate: Scrapped

General characteristics
- Type: Cargo ship
- Tonnage: 1,544 GRT; 911 NRT; 2,500 DWT
- Length: 252 ft 8 in (77.01 m)
- Beam: 39 ft 2 in (11.94 m)
- Depth: 16 ft 6 in (5.03 m)
- Installed power: Triple expansion steam engine
- Propulsion: Screw propeller

Minna was a 1,544 GRT cargo ship that was built in 1922 by Nylands Verksted, Kristiania, Norway for Swedish owners. In 1934, she was sold and renamed Britt. In 1939, she was captured by the Kriegsmarine and sold to German owners in 1940 and was renamed Leba. In 1945, she was seized by the Allies and passed to the Ministry of War Transport(MoWT). She was renamed Empire Conavon and was sold in 1947 to a British company and was renamed Baltkon. She served until 1959 when she was scrapped.

== Description ==
The ship was built by Nylands Verksted, Kristiana as yard number 261. She was delivered to her owners in March 1922.

The ship was 252 feet 8 inches (77.01 m) long, with a beam of 39 feet 2 inches (11.94 m) and a depth of 16 feet 6 inches (5.03 m). She had a GRT of 1,522 and a NRT of 911.

The ship was propelled by a triple expansion steam engine, which had cylinders of 19 inches (48 cm), 31 inches (79 cm) and 51.5 inches (131 cm) diameter by 33 inches (84 cm) stroke. The engine was built by Nylands Verksted.

== History ==
Minna was built for Trelleborgs Ångfartygs Nya AB, Trelleborg, which was her port of registry. She was placed under the management of F Malmros. The Swedish Official Number 6735 and Code Letters KDMV were allocated. In 1934, her Code Letters were changed to SFNE.

On 2 February 1934, Minna was sold to Kalmar Rederi AB, Kalmar and was renamed Britt. She was placed under the management of H Jeansson and her port of registry was changed to Kalmar. On 27 November 1937, her port of registry was changed to Stockholm. On 21 December 1939, Britt was captured by the Kriegsmarine. She was on a voyage from Sweden to Aberdeen with a cargo of woodpulp. She was taken to Hamburg, where she was registered on 17 May 1940. Britt was sold to Leth & Co, Hamburg and was renamed Leba.

In May 1945, Leba was seized at Lübeck by the Allies. She was passed to the MoWT and renamed Empire Conavon. Empire Conavon was operated under the management of Nelkon Steamship Co Ltd, Hull. In 1947, she was sold to the Konnel Steamship Co Ltd and was renamed Baltkon. She was operated under the management of John Carlbom & Co Ltd. In 1954, Baltkon was sold to the Carlbomska Woking Shipping Co Ltd, Hull. She served until 1958 when she was laid up in the River Tyne. In 1959, Baltkon was sold to the British Iron & Steel Corporation (BISCO), and was scrapped at Dunston on Tyne.
