= Universities Space Research Association =

Independent, nonprofit research corporation to advance space science and technology

- Abbreviation: USRA
- Formation: March 12, 1969; 57 years ago
- Founder: James E. Webb et al.
- Founded at: Washington, D.C.
- Legal status: Nonprofit organization
- Purpose: "To advance the space- and aeronautics-related sciences"
- Headquarters: 425 3rd Street SW; Suite 950; Washington DC 20024
- Location: United States
- Region served: Multinational
- Fields: Aeronautics; Space research
- Official language: English
- President: Elsayed Talaat
- Chair of the board of trustees: Gen. Lester L. Lyles (ret.)
- Subsidiaries: Lunar and Planetary Institute
- Affiliations: NASA
- Website: www.usra.edu

The Universities Space Research Association (USRA) is a private nonprofit corporation incorporated on March 12, 1969, in Washington, D.C. under the auspices of the National Academy of Sciences (NAS) to promote exploration in space- and aeronautics-related sciences through innovative research, technology, and educational programs. Institutional membership in the association currently stands at 122 universities. All member institutions have graduate programs in space sciences or technology.

== Objective ==
USRA provides a mechanism through which universities can cooperate effectively with one another, with the government, and with other organizations to further space science and technology, and to promote education in these areas. Its mission is carried out through the institutes, centers, divisions, and programs, by more than 200 administrative and scientific personnel. A unique feature of USRA's management is its system of standing panels of technical experts, drawn from the research community, to provide oversight for USRA's institutes, centers, divisions and programs.

== Origin ==
USRA was founded in 1969, at NASA's request, under the auspices of the National Academy of Sciences. Just prior to the Apollo 11 Moon landing, and the return of the lunar samples, NASA sought a new partner organization to engage and organize the research community. James Webb, NASA Administrator, wrote to President Frederick Seitz, proposing a university association, chartered to advance space science and technology. The result: the formation of USRA. Webb envisioned this new association as not only working with NASA in lunar science, but also in other scientific disciplines and technology areas, in which NASA would become engaged, as its space exploration role unfolded.

As the civilian space program grew to encompass missions in heliophysics, planetary science, astrophysics, Earth sciences, microgravity science, and other disciplines, as well as technology development, USRA worked alongside NASA. All the efforts under taken by USRA from its founding to the present day fulfil its nonprofit purpose and also realize Webb's vision of close partnership and engagement of universities.

USRA's first task: operation of the Lunar Science Institute and engaging the scientific community in the analysis of lunar samples that would be returned to Earth during the Apollo missions. Now called the Lunar and Planetary Institute, the LPI cultivated strong collaboration between NASA and the international research community to help organize a new research discipline: lunar and planetary science. The LPI helped lead research that resulted in a new understanding about the origin of the Moon. Today, the LPI, located in USRA's facility near NASA's Johnson Space Center, continues the important job of organizing community activities to support NASA's exploration of the Solar System, with a specialized scientific and administrative staff.

== Charter ==
On March 1, 1968, President Lyndon Johnson announced the creation of the Lunar Science Institute (LSI), and USRA was chartered the following year as the parent organization of LSI. The initial headquarters of USRA was at the University of Virginia, where Professor A. R. Kuhlthau served as the first president of the association.

In 1976, Dr. Alexander J. Dessler became the second USRA president. Dessler moved the headquarters of the association to Rice University, where he served as chairman of the Department of Space Physics and Astronomy.

In 1978 USRA headquarters moved to Columbia, Maryland.

In 2022 USRA headquarters moved to Washington DC.

== Other programs ==
USRA initially concentrated on the management of Lunar Science Institute (later renamed the Lunar and Planetary Institute) but, armed with its broad charter, the consortium began to explore other ways to serve the university space research community as early as 1970. Today, USRA researchers are involved with university, government and industry scientists and engineers in a broad array of space and aeronautics related fields, including astronomy and astrophysics, Earth sciences, microgravity, life sciences, space technology, computer science, and advanced concepts.

Most USRA research activities include related educational components.

The presidents of USRA have been:

- A. Robert Kuhlthau (1969–1976)
- Alexander J. Dessler (1976–1981)
- Paul J. Coleman Jr. (1981–2000)
- David C. Black (2000–2006)
- Frederick A. Tarantino (2006–2014)
- Donald A. Kniffen (2014)
- Jeffrey A. Isaacson (2014–2024)
- Elsayed R. Talaat (2025-Present)

Current Institutes and Programs

- Lunar and Planetary Institute (LPI)
- Earth from Space Institute (EfSI)
- Science and Technology Institute (STI)
- Partnership for Heliophysics and Space Environment Research (PHaSER)
- Research Institute for Advanced Computer Science (RIACS)
- Subcontractor for Glenn Engineering and Research Support (GEARS)
- NSF Engines (SPARC Ohio)
- Center for Space and Nuclear Research (CSNR)
- University Consortium Research Opportunity
- AFRL Scholars Program

Small Business Subsidiaries

- E Street Technologies (ESTech) ]

Previous Institutes and Programs

- Arecibo Observatory
- Center for Advanced Space Studies (CASS)
- Center for Program/Project Management Research (CPMR)
- Cooperative Program in Space Science (CPSS)
- Division of Space Life Sciences (DSLS)
- Education Programs Office at CASS
- Earth Sciences Applications Research Program (ESARP)
- Earth System Science Education for the 21st Century (ESSE 21)
- Earth System Science Program (ESSP) in Huntsville
- Goddard Earth Science Technology and Research (GESTAR)
- NASA Institute for Advanced Concepts (NIAC) program
- NASA Internship Program
- NASA Post Doctoral Program (NPP)
- NASA Summer Faculty Research Opportunities (NSFRO)
- National Center for Earth and Space Science Education (NCESSE)
- National Center for Space Exploration Research on Fluids and Combustion (NCSER)
- Navy Astronomy Programs (NRL and USNO)
- Revolutionary Aerospace Systems Concepts - Academic Linkage (RASC-AL) Program
- Stratospheric Observatory for Infrared Astronomy (SOFIA)
- Technology Development and Aerospace Environments (TDAE)
- USRA Astronomy Program in Huntsville
- Visiting Researcher Exchange and Outreach (VREO) Program
