= Glenn Britt =

American businessman (1949–2014)

Glenn Allen Brit
- Born: May 6, 1949
- Died: June 11, 2014 (aged 65)
- Education: Dartmouth College
- Spouse: Barbara

Glenn Allen Britt (May 6, 1949 – June 11, 2014) was an American businessman and the former chairman and CEO of Time Warner Cable.

== Early life and education ==
Glenn Britt was born in Washington, D.C., and grew up in New York City. He attended Dartmouth College, where he graduated magna cum laude with a bachelor's degree in economics in 1971. Britt later earned an MBA from the Tuck School of Business at Dartmouth in 1972.

== Career ==
=== Early career ===
Britt began his career in the telecommunications industry at the American Television and Communications (ATC) division of Time Inc. in 1972. He held various finance and marketing positions before becoming vice president and Treasurer of Time Inc. in 1986.

=== Time Warner Cable ===
In 1990, Britt joined Time Warner Cable, where he played a key role in the company's growth and expansion. He became the CFO in 1992 and became President of Time Warner Cable Ventures in 1999, focusing on developing new businesses and technologies.

Britt was named president and CEO of Time Warner Cable in 2001 and became chairman and CEO in 2009.

During his tenure, Britt oversaw the company's spin-off from Time Warner Inc. in 2009, making Time Warner Cable an independent, publicly traded company. His leadership was marked by a focus on improving customer service and expanding the company's technological capabilities.

== Legacy and impact ==
Britt was recognized as a visionary leader in the telecommunications industry. He served on the boards of various organizations, including Xerox Corporation and the National Cable & Telecommunications Association (NCTA). Britt's contributions to the industry were honored with several awards, including induction into the Broadcasting & Cable Hall of Fame in 2011.

Britt was known for advocating for innovation in the industry, including the rollout of high-definition television, digital video recorders, and broadband internet services.

=== Dartmouth College ===
In 2024, Dartmouth College announced a $150 million bequest to the college and its Tuck School of Business from Britt and his wife, Barbara, who died in 2023. The Britts' donation is the largest bequest for scholarships in Dartmouth's 255-year history. The Tuck School will receive one-fourth of the Britts' gift, making it "the largest single outright gift" in Tuck's history. During their lifetimes, the Britts were active Dartmouth donors and established the Britt Impact Technology Series at the Glassmeyer/McNamee Center for Digital Strategies at the Tuck School.

== Personal life ==
Glenn Britt was married to Barbara Britt in 1975. The couple had no children. He died on June 11, 2014, at the age of 65, after a battle with melanoma.
