= John H. Comstock =

American politician (1904–1993)

Member of the Nebraska Legislature from the 19th district
- In office January 5, 1937 – January 3, 1939
- Preceded by: Position created
- Succeeded by: George Craven

Member of the Nebraska House of Representatives from the 35th district
- In office January 6, 1931 – January 5, 1937
- Preceded by: Rolla C. VanKirk
- Succeeded by: Position abolished

Personal details
- Born: March 28, 1904 Lincoln, Nebraska
- Died: September 21, 1993 (aged 89) Lincoln, Nebraska
- Party: Republican
- Spouse: Phyllis K. Jones (m. 1936)
- Children: 2
- Education: University of Nebraska (B.Sc., LL.B.)
- Occupation: Attorney

John H. Comstock (March 28, 1904 – September 21, 1993) was a Republican politician from Nebraska who served as a member of the Nebraska House of Representatives from the 26th district from 1931 to 1937 and as a member of the Nebraska Legislature from the 19th district from 1937 to 1939.

== Early life ==
Comstock was born in Lincoln, Nebraska, in 1904, and graduated from Lincoln High School in 1920. He attended the University of Nebraska, receiving his bachelor's degree in business administration in 1924 and his bachelor of laws degree in 1927. After Comstock was admitted to the bar in 1924, he practiced in Lincoln.

== Nebraska House of Representatives ==
In 1930, Comstock ran for the Nebraska House of Representatives from the 35th district. He won the Republican nomination and defeated Democrat Donald Renner in the general election with 67 percent of the vote. Comstock was re-elected in 1932 and 1934. In the 1935 special session, he served as the Minority Leader of the State House.

== Nebraska Legislature ==
When the State House and Senate were consolidated into the unicameral legislature, Comstock ran in the newly created 19th district in 1936. He faced graduate student Charles Selk, attorney J. C. McReynolds, V. G. Hill, and Wade Munn in the nonpartisan primary. Comstock placed first in the primary, and advanced to the general election with Munn. Comstock defeated Munn with 54 percent of the vote.

While in the legislature, Comstock advocated for legislation to allow assisted suicide, and was a leader in the National Society for the Legalization of Euthanasia.

In 1938, Comstock declined to seek re-election.

== Post-legislative career ==
After leaving the legislature, Comstock resumed his legal practice. He was served on the Lincoln City Council from 1949 to 1952, and then as the City Attorney from 1953 to 1954. He was elected to the City Council afterwards, and served from 1962 to 1968.

== Death ==
Comstock died on September 21, 1993.
