= Regional Planetary Image Facility =

Regional Planetary Image Facility Network
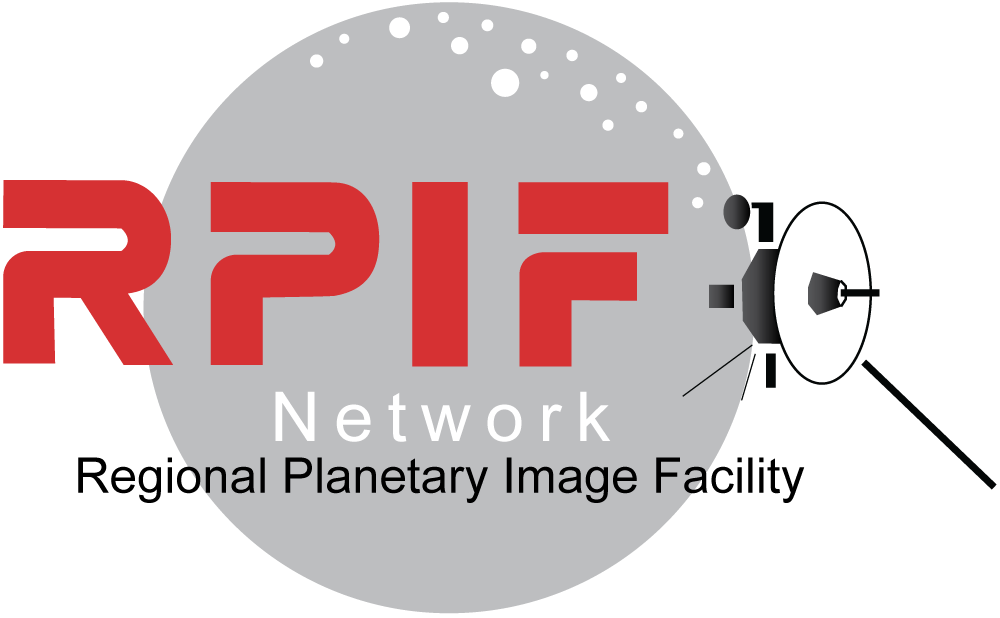
- Logo of the Regional Planetary Image Facility Network

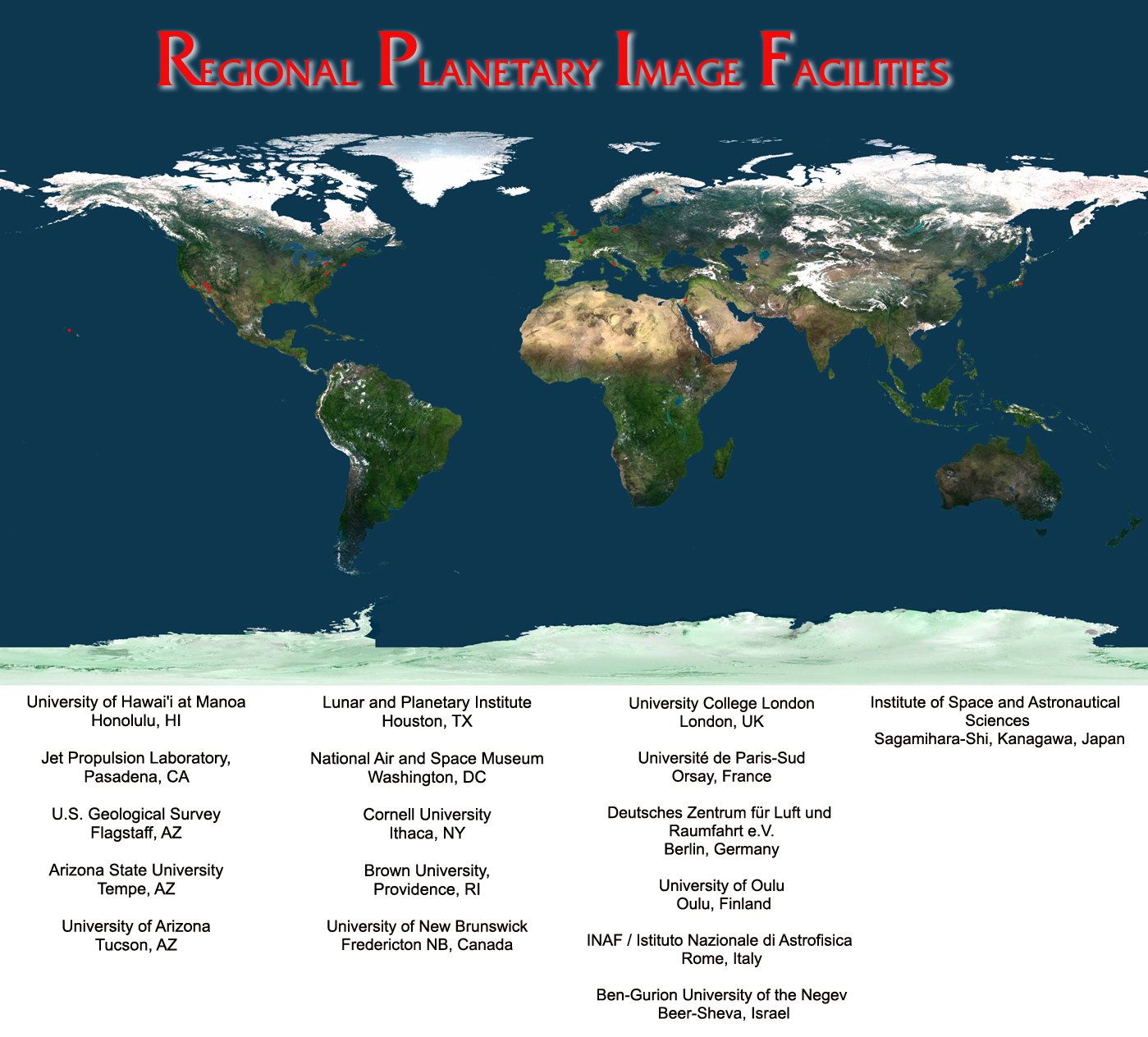
- Regional Planetary Image Facility Locations
- Abbreviation: RPIF
- Formation: 1977
- Purpose: Research, Education, Outreach
- Parent organization: NASA
- Website: www.lpi.usra.edu/library/RPIF/

The Regional Planetary Image Facilities (RPIFs) are planetary image and data libraries located throughout the United States and abroad that are funded by the host institutions. They once had funding from NASA. A network of these facilities was established in 1977 to maintain photographic and digital data as well as mission documentation.

Each facility's general holding contains images and maps of planets and their satellites taken by solar system exploration spacecraft. These planetary image facilities are often open to the public. The facilities are primarily reference centers for browsing, studying, and selecting lunar and planetary photographic and cartographic materials. Experienced staff can assist scientists, educators, students, media, and the public in ordering materials for their own use.

Since it was formally established, the network of RPIFs once numbered nine U.S. facilities and seven in other countries. The first RPIF to be established outside of the U.S. was in England in 1980 at the University College London (UCL), and since then RPIFs have been set up in Canada, France, Germany, Israel, Italy, and Japan.

== Resources and services offered ==
The RPIFs store and maintain a variety of planetary data and imagery, making them unique resources covering decades of planetary science. Among the offerings are:

- Digital and non-digital data and supporting documents from U.S. and foreign lunar and planetary missions flown since 1959
- The Earth Impact Database at the Canadian RPIF at the University of New Brunswick
- More than 10,000 planetary images from Earth-based telescopes, Photographic Lunar Atlas and Rectified Lunar Atlas at the University of Arizona Space Imagery Center
- A collection of near-infrared reflectance spectra of small areas of the lunar surface and 3-D Prints of Planetary Landscapes at the University of Hawaii RPIF
- An inventory of 120,000 United States Geological Survey (USGS) lunar and planetary maps at the USGS Astrogeology RPIF
- The Cornell University Meteorite Collection inventory at the Cornell University RPIF
- An extensive collection of online maps, publications, and outreach tools maintained by the Lunar and Planetary Institute RPIF
- The Ronald Greeley Center for Planetary Studies (RGCPS), the Arizona State University RPIF, holds over 200,000 images and negatives from planetary missions, from the Lunar Orbiters of the 1960s to the Galileo mission to Jupiter that ended in the early 2000s.
