= George Craven (politician) =

American politician (1895–1950)

Member of the Nebraska Legislature from the 19th district
- In office January 5, 1943 – January 2, 1945
- Preceded by: Jack Price
- Succeeded by: Thomas H. Adams
- In office January 3, 1939 – January 7, 1941
- Preceded by: John H. Comstock
- Succeeded by: Jack Price

Personal details
- Born: March 17, 1895 Loup County, Nebraska
- Died: January 16, 1950 (aged 54) Lincoln, Nebraska
- Party: Democratic
- Education: University of Nebraska (LL.B.)
- Occupation: Attorney

Military service
- Allegiance: United States
- Branch/service: United States Army

George I. Craven (March 17, 1895 – January 16, 1950) was an American politician from Nebraska who served as a member of the Nebraska Legislature from the 19th district from 1939 to 1941 and again from 1943 to 1945.

== Early life ==
Craven was born near Brewster in Loup County, Nebraska, in 1895. He attended the University of Nebraska from 1914 to 1916, leaving to serve in the U.S. Army during World War I, and returned in 1919, graduating with his bachelor of laws degree in 1922. Craven practiced as an attorney in Lincoln.

== Nebraska Legislature ==
In 1938, Craven ran for the state legislature from the 19th district when incumbent State Senator John H. Comstock did not seek re-election. In the general election, he defeated Wade Munn, a farm loan adjuster. Though the election was formally nonpartisan, Craven was a Democrat.

Craven did not run for re-election in 1940, returning to his legal practice, and was succeeded by Jack Price.

Price did not seek re-election in 1942 after he entered military service, and Craven ran to succeed him. He faced former school superintendent Thomas H. Adams, auto dealer Howard Britt, and attorney George Milliken in the nonpartisan primary. Craven placed first, receiving 48 percent of the vote. He proceeded to the general election with Adams, who received 25 percent of the vote, and narrowly defeated him, winning 51–49 percent.

Craven did not run for re-election in 1944.

== Death ==
Craven suffered a fatal heart attack at the Lancaster County Courthouse while litigating a divorce case on January 16, 1950, and died later that day at St. Elizabeth Hospital.
