= William Walden Rubey =

American geologist

William Walden Rubey (December 19, 1898 – April 12, 1974) was an American geologist.

He was born in Moberly, Missouri. He attended the University of Missouri, and in 1920 he graduated with an A.B. degree. During the same year he married Susan Elsie Manovill, and joined the U.S. Geological Survey. He performed his graduate studies at Johns Hopkins University and Yale University.

During the Second World War he served as a scientific liaison to the U.S. Army for the Geological Survey. In 1950 he was the president of the Geological Society of America. From 1951 until 1954 he was the chairman of the National Research Council for the National Academy of Sciences. In 1960 he was appointed by the president to serve on the National Science Board for the National Science Foundation. The same year he was also appointed professor of geology and geophysics at UCLA, where he would remain until 1966 and be recalled each year thereafter. He served on the board of trustees for Science Service, now known as Society for Science & the Public, from 1956 to 1964. He also served in many other distinguished posts and positions.

After retiring from the U.S. Geological Survey, he joined the Lunar Science Institute (later renamed the Lunar and Planetary Institute) in 1968, serving as director from 1968 to 1971. He participated in the scientific examination of the Apollo program returned lunar samples until 1971.

He died of cancer in Santa Monica, California. During his career he made multiple contributions to the science of geology, including studies of the hydrology of streams, the geology of western Wyoming, seismic energy, mountain building from overthrust faulting, the growth of continents, the origins of the Earth's atmosphere and oceans, and the evolution of terrestrial planets.

== Awards and honors ==
- United States National Academy of Sciences member, 1945.
- American Philosophical Society member, 1952.
- American Academy of Arts and Sciences member, 1953.
- National Medal of Science, 1965.
- Penrose Medal of the Geological Society of America, 1963.
- Four honorary degrees, including three doctorates.
- The wrinkle ridge Dorsa Rubey on the Moon is named after him.
