= Chris Britt =

American cartoonist

- Education: University of Illinois at Urbana–Champaign
- Occupation: Editorial cartoonist
- Known for: Political cartoons
- Awards: Sigma Delta Chi Award (1994, 2011); National Headliner Award (2009); Berryman Award (1994)

Chris Britt is an editorial cartoonist and author from Phoenix, Arizona. Britt is a graduate of the University of Illinois Urbana-Champaign's College of Fine Arts with a degree in visual arts. Britt has been a cartoonist since 1991.

His work runs weekly in the Illinois Times, and he has worked as a cartoonist at the State Journal-Register of Springfield, Illinois, The Seattle Times, The Sacramento Union, The Houston Post, and The News Tribune of Tacoma, Washington. His cartoons have been published in Newsweek, Newsweek Japan, Time magazine, U.S. News & World Report, The New York Times, The Washington Post, and USA Today. They have also been aired on CNN's Inside Politics, MSNBC, Fox News and ABC's Good Morning America.

His awards include first place for editorial cartooning from the Washington Press Association in 1995, the National Press Foundation's Berryman Award as editorial cartoonist of the year in 1994, and the Sigma Delta Chi Award for editorial cartooning from the Society of Professional Journalists in 2009.

Britt currently works as a children's author. He published his first book, The Most Perfect Snowman, in October 2016 via HarperCollins.

Britt currently lives and works from Tacoma, Washington.

== Awards ==
- 1994 Clifford K. and James T. Berryman Award for Editorial Cartooning (National Press Foundation)
- 1995 Washington Press Association award for editorial cartooning
- 2006 1st place—Illinois Press Association competition
- 2007 James P. McGuire Award for Excellence in Journalism
- 2009 Sigma Delta Chi Award for editorial cartooning (Society of Professional Journalists)
