= Dorsa Rubey =

Wrinkle ridge system on the Moon

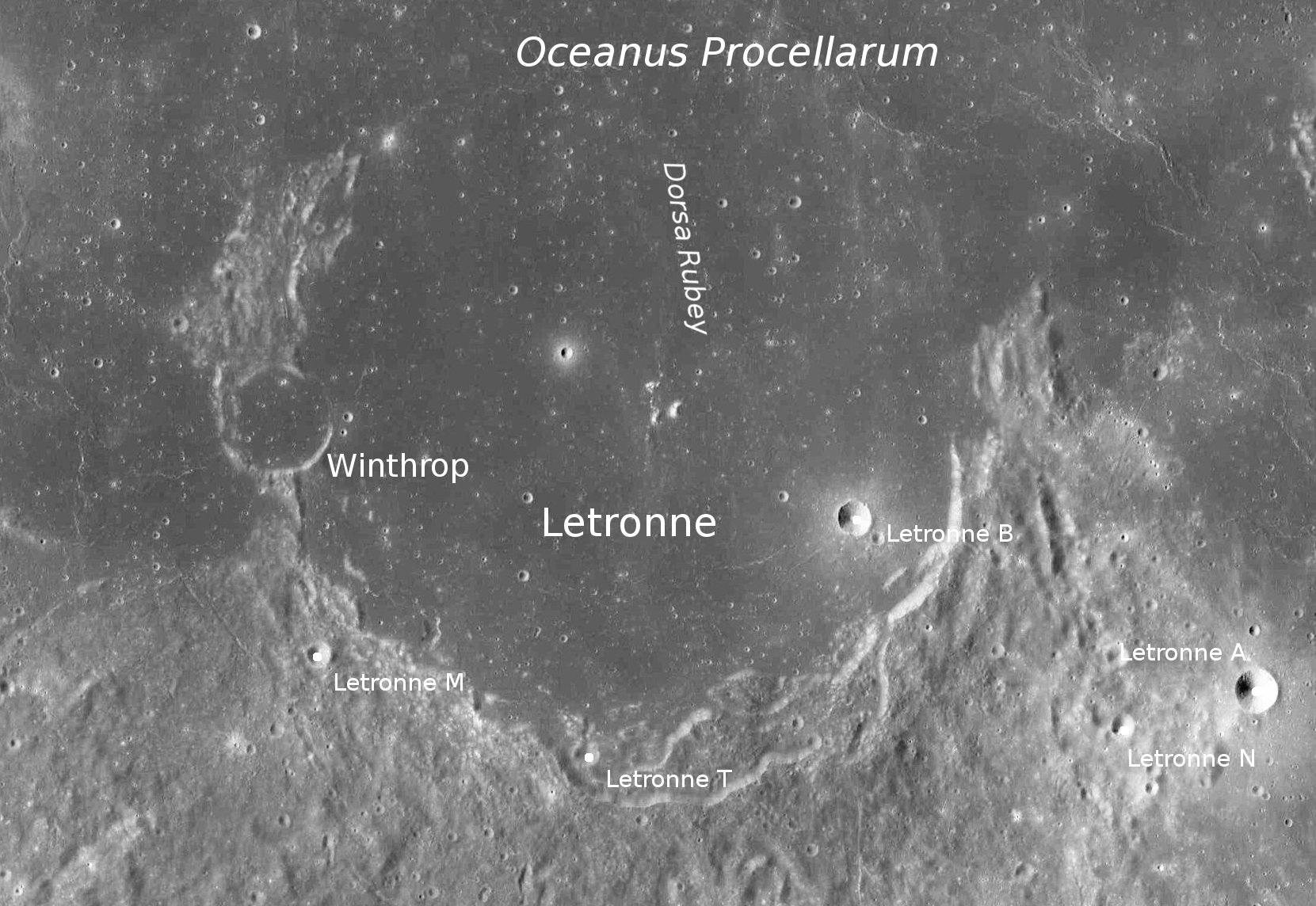
The southern portion of Dorsa Rubey at the vicinity of Letronne Crater

Dorsa Rubey is a wrinkle ridge system in Oceanus Procellarum on the Moon. It is 100 km long and was named after American geologist William Walden Rubey in 1976. It's coordinates are at 10.0°S 42.0°W.
