= Tom Britt =

American interior designer (1936–2026)

- Born: Thomas Burgin Britt; March 4, 1936; Kansas City, Missouri
- Died: January 4, 2026 (aged 89); Astoria, Queens, New York
- Occupation: Interior designer

Thomas Burgin Britt (March 4, 1936 – January 4, 2026) was an American interior designer known for his opulent, maximalist style.

== Life and career ==
Tom Britt was born on March 4, 1936, in Kansas City, Missouri. He was the eldest of two sons of Ruth (Burgin) Britt and lawyer James Thomas Britt. As a child, he was interested in the arts and interior design. He was a regular reader of House & Garden and House Beautiful. He had early experiences designing interiors, including redecorating his grandparents' third floor with a bold black-and-silver palette. When he was 15, his parents entrusted him to renovate their home while they were away, a project that involved moving walls, adding architectural pilasters, and changing the colors of the rooms of his parents.

Britt studied design at the Parsons School of Design and graduated from New York University in 1959. While at NYU, he was mentored by and worked as an assistant for the designer Rose Cumming. He worked for interior designer John Gerald for five years, until he founded his own design firm in New York City in 1964. After founding the firm, he had a five-year partnership with the South American designer William Piedrahita in a furniture design business.

Britt died at his home in Astoria, Queens, on January 4, 2026, at the age of 89.
