= Dan Britt =

American astrogeologist (born 1950)

- Born: Daniel Turner Britt; December 1, 1950; Ann Arbor, Michigan
- Education: Brown University; University of Washington
- Scientific career
- Workplaces: University of Central Florida
- Thesis: (1991)

Daniel Turner Britt is Pegasus Professor of Astronomy and Planetary Sciences at the University of Central Florida (UCF). He studies the composition and mineralogy of bodies within the Solar System including the Moon, Mars and the asteroids. He has worked on four NASA missions and has an asteroid named after him: 4395 Danbritt.

In 2022, the American Society of Civil Engineers awarded him their Outstanding Technical Contribution Award for his work at the Exolith Lab at UCF which has produced tons of "space dirt" – synthetic regolith which reproduces the properties of the surface material on other worlds such as Mars.
