= Howard Britt =

American politician (1887–1953)

Howard Leslie Britt

Member of the Nebraska Legislature from the 19th district
- In office January 6, 1953 – September 24, 1953
- Preceded by: Thomas H. Adams
- Succeeded by: Fay Britt

Personal details
- Born: 1887 near Seward, Nebraska
- Died: September 24, 1953 (aged 66) Everett, Washington
- Party: Republican
- Spouse: Fay Britt (m. 1914)
- Education: Cotner College (A.B.)
- Occupation: Automobile dealer

Howard Leslie Britt (1887 – September 24, 1953) was a Republican politician from Nebraska who served as a member of the Nebraska Legislature from the 19th district from January to September 1953.

== Early life ==
Britt was born near Seward, Nebraska, in 1887. He graduated from Seward High School in 1903, and graduated from Cotner College with his bachelor's degree in 1909. He helped organize the lyceum and chatauqua movement in the state from 1909 to 1915, and later owned and operated an automobile dealership in Lincoln.

== Nebraska Legislature ==
In 1942, State Senator Jack Price did not seek re-election in the Lancaster County-based 19th district, and Britt ran to succeed him. In the primary election, he faced former State Senator George Craven, and Thomas H. Adams and George Milliken, both of whom were attorneys. Britt placed third in the primary election, receiving 15 percent to Craven's 48 percent, Adams's 25 percent, and Milliken's 12 percent. Craven ultimately won the election, defeating Adams by a 51–49 percent margin.

When Craven declined to seek re-election in 1944, Britt ran again, and faced Lincoln City Councilman Rees Wilkinson, Adams, former State Representative James Lundy, machinist Joseph Charles Dale, and Harry Easton in the primary election. Wilkinson placed first by a wide margin, receiving 41 percent of the vote, and Adams narrowly defeated Britt for second place, receiving 19 percent of the vote to Britt's 16 percent. Adams narrowly defeated Wilkinson in the general election.

In 1946, Adams ran for re-election to a second term, and Britt ran against him, as did Dale and Wilkinson. Britt placed third, receiving 15 percent of the vote to Adams's 37 percent and Wilkinson's 41 percent. Adams ultimately won re-election, and was re-elected in 1948 and 1950.

Britt challenged Adams for re-election in 1952, and was joined in the primary by insurance agent F. M. Stapleton. Adams placed first in the primary, receiving 54 percent of the vote to Britt's 30 percent and Stapleton's 16 percent. Adams and Britt advanced to the general election. In what the Lincoln Evening Journal called a "major surprise," Britt narrowly defeated Adams, winning 53 percent of the vote to Adams's 47 percent.

After the 1953 legislative session, he and his wife, Fay Britt, were traveling to Vancouver for vacation, when he became ill on August 28, and was admitted to the Providence Hospital in Everett, Washington. Britt died on September 24, 1953. Governor Robert B. Crosby ultimately appointed Fay to serve out the remainder of Britt's term in 1954.
