= Fay Britt =

American politician (1890–1980)

Member of the Nebraska Legislature from the 19th district
- In office April 7, 1954 – January 4, 1955
- Preceded by: Howard Britt
- Succeeded by: Thomas H. Adams

Personal details
- Born: February 22, 1890 David City, Nebraska
- Died: January 24, 1980 (aged 89) Lincoln, Nebraska
- Party: Republican
- Spouse: Howard Britt (m. 1914; died 1953)
- Education: University of Nebraska (A.B.)
- Occupation: Housewife, china painter, bookkeeper

Fay Osterhout Britt (February 22, 1890 – January 24, 1980) was a Republican politician from Nebraska who served as a member of the Nebraska Legislature from the 19th district from 1954 to 1955, completing the term of her late husband Howard Britt.

== Early life ==
Fay Osterhout was born in David City, Nebraska, in 1890, and graduated from David City High School in 1907. She attended the University of Nebraska, receiving her bachelor's degree in 1912. She married Howard Britt in 1914.

== Nebraska Legislature ==
In 1953, while she and her husband, a member of the Nebraska Legislature, were traveling to Vancouver, he died in Everett, Washington. Though Governor Robert Crosby originally announced that he would not fill the vacancy, he changed his mind after a special legislative session was convened, and appointed Britt to serve out the remaining months of her husband's term in 1954. She was sworn in on April 7, 1954, and was the second woman to serve in the unicameral state legislature. Britt declined to seek a full term in the 1954 election.

== Death ==
Britt died on January 24, 1980.
