= Solar System Exploration Research Virtual Institute =

Organization established by NASA in 2008

The Solar System Exploration Research Virtual Institute (SSERVI), originally the NASA Lunar Science Institute, is an organization, established by NASA in 2008, that supplemented and extended existing NASA lunar science programs. Supported by the NASA Science Mission Directorate (SMD) and the Exploration Systems Mission Directorate (ESMD), SSERVI is a NASA program office located at the NASA Ames Research Center and was modeled on the NASA Astrobiology Institute (NAI) with dispersed teams across the nation working together to help lead the agency's research activities related to NASA's human exploration goals. Competitively selected team investigations focused on one or more aspects of lunar science investigations of the Moon (including lunar samples), from the Moon, and on the Moon.

In 2013 the NLSI became the Solar System Exploration Research Virtual Institute and expanded its scope to include Near-Earth asteroids and Phobos and Deimos.

== Teams ==
The Solar System Exploration Research Virtual Institute (SSERVI) is composed of 12 U.S. teams, and 11 international partners. The teams are listed below:

=== Current US teams ===
Current US teams are:

CAN-2 selections

- Network for Exploration and Space Science (NESS); principal investigator Jack Burns, University of Colorado in Boulder, CO.
  - Focus: Conducting research in robotics, cosmology, astrophysics and heliophysics.
  - https://www.colorado.edu/ness
- Exploration Science Pathfinder Research for Enhancing SS Observations (ESPRESSO); principal investigator Alex Parker, Southwest Research Institute in Boulder, CO.
  - Focus: A range of science and operations objectives relevant to characterizing target surfaces and mitigating hazards that create risk for robotic and human explorers.
  - https://www.espresso.institute
- Toolbox for Research and Exploration (TREX); principal investigator Amanda Hendrix, Planetary Science Institute in Tucson, AZ.
  - Focus: Laboratory spectral measurements and experiments, data analysis, surface characteristics & ISRU on airless bodies.
  - https://trex.psi.edu
- Radiation Effects on Volatiles and Exploration of Asteroids & Lunar Surfaces (REVEALS); principal investigator Thomas Orlando, Georgia Institute of Technology in Atlanta, GA.
  - Focus: Radiation chemistry, volatile formation, volatile sequestration and transport, regolith and composite materials.
  - https://reveals.gatech.edu

CAN-3 selections

- Center for Lunar and Asteroid Surface Science (CLASS); principal investigator Dan Britt, University of Central Florida (UCF) in Orlando.
  - Focus: Regolith of the Moon and asteroids, specifically looking at the physical properties and resources of regolith and its behavior in the space environment. CLASS also will create soil simulants that will help other teams and the broader science community in this research area.
- – Interdisciplinary Consortium for Evaluating Volatile Origins (ICE FIVE-O); principal investigator Jeffrey Gillis-Davis, at the University of Hawai‘i at Mānoa in Honolulu.
  - Focus: Remote sensing of airless bodies and how things weather in space. Modeling the physical, chemical, and isotopic signatures around the Moon’s polar regions. ICE FIVE-O will address curation protocols for sample return and the evolution of volatiles, or low-boiling point compounds, and minerals within long-duration, curated samples.
- Remote, In Situ, and Synchrotron Studies for Science and Exploration 2 (RISE2); principal investigator Timothy Glotch, Stony Brook University in New York.
  - Focus: This team will investigate how planetary environments impact human health by looking at the chemical reactivity of regolith in association with animal cells and tissues. RISE2 also will analyze how remote sensing datasets can be confirmed through laboratory experiments, analyses, and field deployments.
- Resource Exploration and Science of OUR Cosmic Environment (RESOURCE); principal investigator Jennifer Heldmann, NASA’s Ames Research Center in California’s Silicon Valley.
  - Focus: This team focuses on determining what volatiles are available on the Moon for in-situ resource utilization. It will assess the quantity and availability of resources on the Moon, test the technology required for processing those resources, and field test the concepts of operations required for sustained human lunar presence.
- Institute for Modeling Plasmas, Atmospheres, and Cosmic Dust (IMPACT); principal investigator Mihaly Horanyi, University of Colorado Boulder.
  - Focus: This team will measure micron-sized dust impacts in icy regolith using the world’s fastest “dust impact” facility, and they will develop hardware to determine secondary particle generation and examine how that hardware degrades over time. IMPACT also will use laboratory experiments to help validate theories of dust and volatile mobility and modeling efforts being completed by other SSERVI teams.
- Lunar Environment And Dynamics for Exploration Research (LEADER); principal investigator Rosemary Killen, NASA’s Goddard Space Flight Center in Greenbelt, Maryland.
  - Focus: This team will focus on plasma interactions with airless bodies and determine the effects of the space environment on robotic and human assets at various geographic locations on the Moon. The team also will model the radiation environments and related effects associated with space exploration.
- Center for Lunar Science and Exploration (CLSE); principal investigator David Kring, Lunar and Planetary Institute in Houston.
  - Focus: Through modeling and geochemical analyses, this team will track the distribution and form of volatiles from the early solar system to the formation of the Moon and subsequent evolution to today. This team will analyze the volatile cycle on the Moon to determine overall source and loss mechanisms and how we can use these resources.
- Geophysical Exploration Of the Dynamics and Evolution of the Solar System (GEODES); principal investigator Nicholas Schmerr, University of Maryland in College Park.
  - Focus: This team will use geophysical modeling and laboratory techniques to characterize the overall evolution, stability, and volatile content of the Moon and asteroid subsurfaces. GEODES will test its theories through analog field campaigns in conjunction with other NASA/SSERVI instrument testing efforts.

=== Previous US teams ===
CAN-1 selections

- Institute for the Science of Exploration Targets (ISET); principal investigator William Bottke, Southwest Research Institute in Boulder CO.
  - Focus: Formation of terrestrial planets and asteroid belt, modeling of the Moon's origin and Phobos/Deimos, history of NEAs and lunar bombardment, NEA origins, identification and characterization
  - https://boulder.swri.edu
- Center for Lunar and Asteroid Surface Science (CLASS); principal investigator Daniel Britt, University of Central Florida in Orlando FL.
  - Focus: Studies of physical properties of regoliths: geotechnical properties, microgravity effects, impact ejecta, dynamics, hydration and weathering of NEAs, charging and mobilization of dust
  - https://sciences.ucf.edu/class
- Volatiles, Regolith and Thermal Investigations Consortium for Exploration and Science (VORTICES); principal investigator Andy Rivkin, Johns Hopkins University Applied Physics Laboratory in Laurel MD.
  - Focus: Volatiles sources/sinks/processes and interaction with regoliths, evolution of regoliths on all target bodies, identification and exploitation of resources
  - https://vortices.jhuapl.edu
- Dynamic Response of Environments at Asteroids, the Moon, and moons of Mars (DREAM2); principal investigator William Farrell, NASA Goddard Space Flight Center in Greenbelt MD.
  - Focus: Plasma interactions, exospheres, Radiation of exposed materials, space weathering, solar storms/solar wind
  - https://ssed.gsfc.nasa.gov/dream
- Remote, In Situ and Synchrotron Studies for Science and Exploration (RIS4E); principal investigator Timothy Glotch, Stony Brook University, NY.
  - Focus: Remote sensing of airless bodies, field operations and metrics for human exploration, reactivity and toxicity of regoliths, synchrotron analyses of samples, volcanics and impact crater analog research
  - https://ris4e.labs.stonybrook.edu
- Field Investigations to Enable Solar System Science and Exploration (FINESSE); principal investigator Jennifer Heldmann, NASA Ames Research Center, CA.
  - Focus: Field operations and metrics for human exploration and analog research.
  - https://finesse.arc.nasa.gov
- Institute for Modeling Plasma, Atmospheres and Cosmic Dust (IMPACT); principal investigator Mihaly Horanyi, University of Colorado in Boulder CO.
  - Focus: Small scale impact studies/regolith gardening, plasma charging and mobilization of dust, near surface plasma environments, new advancements on dust accelerator facility
  - https://impact.colorado.edu
- Inner Solar System Impact Processes; principal investigator David Kring, Lunar and Planetary Institute in Houston TX.
  - Focus: Impact history and processes, geochemistry of regoliths, age dating of regolith materials, NEA identification and characterization
  - https://lpi.usra.edu/exploration
- Evolution and Environment of Exploration Destinations: Science and Engineering Synergism (SEEED); principal investigator Carle Pieters, Brown University in Providence RI.
  - Focus: Thermal/chemical evolution of planetary bodies, origin and evolution of volatiles, remote sensing, space weathering of regoliths
  - https://planetary.brown.edu/html_pages/brown-mit_sservi.htm

=== International partners ===
International partners are:

- Canada
  - Canadian Lunar Research Network (CLRN)
  - Partnership signed July 2008
- South Korea
  - KARI Lunar Exploration Program
  - Associate Partnership signed January 2016
- United Kingdom
  - United Kingdom Team
  - Partnership signed January 2009
- Saudi Arabia
  - Saudi Lunar and Near Earth Object Science Center
  - Partnership signed December 2009
- Israel
  - Israel Network for Lunar Science and Exploration
  - Partnership signed in January 2010
- The Netherlands
  - SSERVI Netherlands Team
  - Partnership signed in August 2010
- Germany (DLR)
  - German Network for Lunar Science and Exploration
  - Partnership signed December 2010
- Italy
  - Affiliate Partnership (INFN) signed September 2014
  - Associate Partnership signed June 2017
- Australia
  - Partnership signed July 2015
- France
  - Partnership signed May 2016
- Japan
  - Partnership signed July 2019
