= Masursky (disambiguation) =

Harold Masursky (1922–1990) was an American astrogeologist.

Masursky may also refer to:

- Masursky (Martian crater), a crater on Mars
- 2685 Masursky, an asteroid
- Masursky Award, an award for meritorious service to planetary science
