= Bjorkman =

Bjorkman or Björkman is a Swedish-language surname. Notable people with the surname include:

- Carl Björkman (1869–1960), Swedish sport shooter
- Carl Björkman (politician) (1873–1948), Finnish politician
- Christer Björkman (born 1957), Swedish singer
- Ernie Bjorkman, U.S. television presenter
- Frances Maule Bjorkman (1879–1956), National Woman Suffrage Association
- George Bjorkman (born 1956), U.S. baseball player
- Gustav Björkman (born 1976), Swedish bandy player
- Jan Björkman (born 1950), Swedish politician
- Jesse Bjorkman, American politician from Alaska
- Jonas Björkman (born 1972), Swedish tennis player
- Karen Bjorkman, American astronomer
- Pamela J. Bjorkman, U.S. biologist
- Stig Björkman (born 1938), Swedish writer and film critic
- Tönnes Björkman (1888–1959), Swedish sport shooter
