= LPSC =

LPSC can refer to:

- Louisiana Public Service Commission
- Liquid Propulsion Systems Centre, an ISRO India research centre
- Laboratoire de physique subatomique et de cosmologie de Grenoble, a CNRS research centre
- Lunar and Planetary Science Conference
