= Christina Richey =

American planetary scientist and astrophysicist

Christina Rae Richey
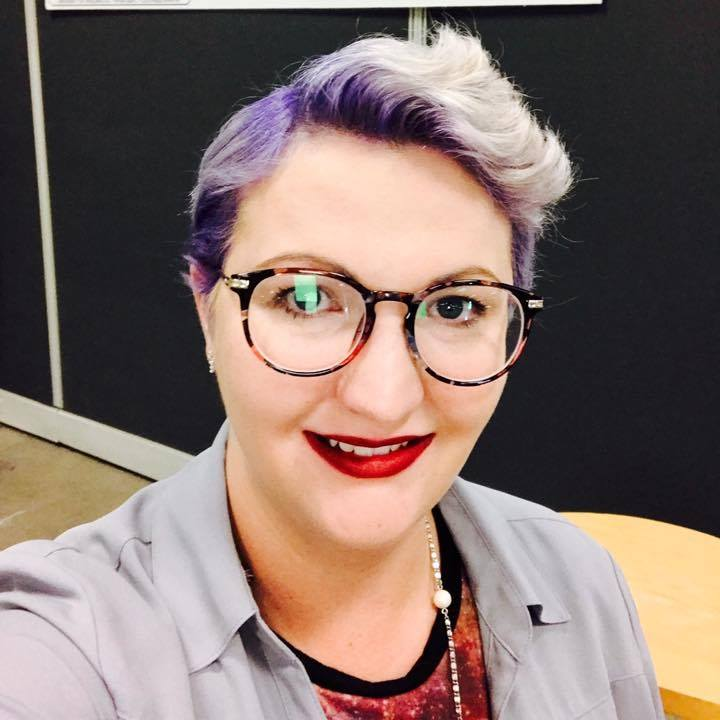
- Born: East Liverpool, Ohio
- Education: Wheeling Jesuit University; The University of Alabama at Birmingham
- Known for: anti-harassment efforts
- Awards: 2014 NASA Headquarters Special Service Award, 2015 WJU James O'Brien Award from Wheeling Jesuit University, 2015 Harold Masursky Award from the Division for Planetary Sciences, 2016 UAB Trailblazing Alumni Award
- Scientific career
- Fields: Planetary Science and Astrophysics
- Workplaces: Goddard Space Flight Center; NASA Headquarters
- Doctoral advisor: Perry A. Gerakines

Christina "Chrissy" Richey is an American planetary scientist and astrophysicist working at Jet Propulsion Laboratory in La Cañada Flintridge, California. Richey is a project staff scientist for the Europa Clipper mission and is a research technologist in the Astrophysics and Space Sciences Section. Prior to working at JPL, Richey worked as contractor for Arctic Slope Regional Corporation at NASA Headquarters in Washington, D.C. They were a program officer in NASA's Planetary Science Division, the deputy program scientist for the OSIRIS-REx mission, and the deputy science advisor for research and analysis for the Science Mission Directorate.

Richey is known for their education about the effects of harassment in the workplace and within the planetary and astronomical sciences. They were the chair of the American Astronomical Society's Committee on the Status of Women in Astronomy from 2015 to 2017, was the co-chair of the Division for Planetary Sciences' Subcommittee on Professional Climate and Culture, from 2015 to 2017, and are an active blogger for the Women in Astronomy blog.

== Early life and education ==
Richey received their undergraduate degree in physics at Wheeling Jesuit University in 2004. They completed their master's (2007) and PhD (2011) in physics from the University of Alabama at Birmingham, where they did laboratory investigations related to both the icy moons of the outer solar system and the interstellar medium. They were a NASA postdoctoral fellow at NASA Goddard Space Flight Center, where they studied the optical properties of dust grain analogs to better understand early stellar system formation.

== Career and research ==
Richey currently works at JPL as project staff scientist for the Europa Clipper Mission. NASA's Europa Clipper will conduct detailed reconnaissance of Jupiter's moon Europa and investigate whether the icy moon could harbor conditions suitable for life.

Richey was the deputy science advisor for the NASA Science Mission Directorate (SMD), where they compiled and distributed information about the Research and Analysis (R&A) awards from the SMD Divisions, and focused on communication with the greater communities working directly with the SMD. Additionally, they were the deputy program scientist in the Planetary Science Division for the OSIRIS-REx Mission (the Origins Spectral Interpretation Resource Identification Security- Regolith Mission). OSIRIS-REx launched in 2016 and will travel to a near-Earth asteroid, called Bennu and bring back a returned sample to Earth for study. The mission will help scientists investigate how planets formed and how life began, as well as improve our understanding of asteroids that could impact Earth.

In addition to their work, they have worked to promote inclusion within their field. They have spent much of their career speaking at conferences about harassment, efforts to overcome the problems within the field, and educating peers about the impact harassment has on their colleagues. They say women in vulnerable positions within the field—women of color, young women, and those who need to advance their careers—are more likely to face harassment in the workplace. Richey was the chair of the American Astronomical Society's Committee on the Status of Women in Astronomy from 2015 to 2017 and was the co-chair of the Division for Planetary Sciences' Subcommittee on Professional Climate and Culture.

== Awards and honors ==
- 2014: Recognized with a NASA Headquarters Honor Award.
- 2015: Received WJU James O'Brien Award from Wheeling Jesuit University
- 2015: Named the Alumni Scholar in Residence by Wheeling Jesuit University
- 2015: Received Harold Masursky Award from the Division for Planetary Sciences for outstanding service to planetary science and exploration
- 2016: Received the Trailblazing Alumni Award in the College of Arts and Sciences by The University of Alabama at Birmingham
- 2020: Elected a Legacy Fellow of the American Astronomical Society in 2020.
