= Jamie Molaro =

American planetary scientist

- Born: 1986
- Education: San Francisco State University, BS (2008); University of Arizona, MS, PhD (2015)
- Awards: Carl Sagan Medal; Susan Mahan Niebur Early Career Award; NASA Planetary Science Early Career Award
- Scientific career
- Fields: Planetary science
- Workplaces: Planetary Science Institute; NASA Jet Propulsion Laboratory
- Thesis: Stress, on the Rocks: Thermally Induced Stresses in Rocks and Microstructures on Airless Bodies, Implications for Breakdown (2015)
- Doctoral advisor: Shane Byrne
- Website: https://www.jmolaro.com/

Jamie Molaro (born 1986) is an American planetary scientist and artist. The asteroid 30379 Molaro is named for her.

== Education ==
Molaro grew up in Grass Valley, California. She graduated from Bear River High School in 2004. She attended San Francisco State University, where she earned a Bachelor of Science in Physics in 2008. She was awarded the Eden Academic Excellence Award in 2007 and was a Presidential Scholar. She was awarded a Doctor of Philosophy from the University of Arizona (UA) in 2015, where she also completed a Master of Science. She also earned a Certificate in College Teaching.

== Research ==
In 2015, Molaro joined the Jet Propulsion Laboratory as a NASA Post Doctoral Program fellow, where she was a scientist working on the OSIRIS-REx mission under Paul Hayne. Molaro publishes research regarding the impact of thermal forces on rocks, boulders, and landscapes on airless bodies.

As of 2025, she is a research scientist at the Planetary Science Institute.

== Awards ==
- Earth and Space Science Fellowship, NASA, 2012
- Galileo Circle Scholarship, University of Arizona College of Science, 2012
- Gerard P. Kuiper Memorial Award, University of Arizona, 2016
- Asteroid namesake, 30379 Molaro, International Astronomical Union, 2021
- Planetary Science Early Career Award, NASA, 2023
- Susan Mahan Niebur Early Career Award, NASA Solar System Exploration Research Virtual Institute, 2024
- Carl Sagan Medal, American Astronomical Society, 2024

== Selected publications ==
Molaro, J. L.; Walsh, K. J.; Jawin, E. R.; Ballouz, R.-L.; Bennett, C. A.; DellaGiustina, D. N.; Golish, D. R.; Drouet d’Aubigny, C.; Rizk, B.; Schwartz, S. R.; Hanna, R. D.; Martel, S. J.; Pajola, M.; Campins, H.; Ryan, A. J. (2020-06-09). "In situ evidence of thermally induced rock breakdown widespread on Bennu's surface". Nature Communications. 11 (1) 2913. Bibcode:2020NatCo..11.2913M. doi:10.1038/s41467-020-16528-7. ISSN 2041-1723. PMC 7283247. PMID 32518333.

Molaro, J.L.; Byrne, S.; Le, J.-L. (2017). "Thermally induced stresses in boulders on airless body surfaces, and implications for rock breakdown". Icarus. 294: 247–261. arXiv:1703.03085. Bibcode:2017Icar..294..247M. doi:10.1016/j.icarus.2017.03.008.

Molaro, Jamie L.; Byrne, Shane; Langer, Stephen A. (2015). "Grain-scale thermoelastic stresses and spatiotemporal temperature gradients on airless bodies, implications for rock breakdown". Journal of Geophysical Research: Planets. 120 (2): 255–277. arXiv:1501.05389. Bibcode:2015JGRE..120..255M. doi:10.1002/2014JE004729. ISSN 2169-9097.

Molaro, Jamie; Byrne, Shane (2012). "Rates of temperature change of airless landscapes and implications for thermal stress weathering". Journal of Geophysical Research: Planets. 117 (E10) 2012JE004138. Bibcode:2012JGRE..11710011M. doi:10.1029/2012JE004138. ISSN 0148-0227.

== Outreach and science art ==
Molaro founded The Art of Planetary Science, an annual art exhibition, at UA in 2013. In 2015, an art piece inspired by her dissertation won the People's Choice prize. Her work was also exhibited at Michigan State University.

She was the co-leader of Mission: AstroAccess, which promotes access to disabled and chronically ill people in the space sciences. This group published a study of possible accessibility accommodations for space flight. She also founded DAIS (Disabled for Accessibility In Space).
