= Zellner =

Zellner may refer to:

== People ==
- Arnold Zellner (1927–2010), an American economist and statistician
- Arthur J. Zellner (1883–1952), an American screenwriter and studio publicity man
- David Zellner, an American film director, screenwriter, and actor
- Kathleen Zellner, an American attorney
- Lois Zellner (1883–1937), an American screenwriter
- Nicolle Zellner, American planetary scientist
- Peppi Zellner (born 1975), an American football player
- Peter Zellner (born 1969), an American/Australian designer, professor, author, urban theorist, and educator
- Steven Zellner (born 1991), a German footballer
- Tobias Zellner (born 1977), a German footballer
- Torrance Zellner (born 1970), an American track and field athlete
- Yuval Zellner (born 1978), an Israeli politician

== Planet ==
- a minor planet named Zellner
