= Masursky Award =

Award presented by Division for Planetary Sciences

Harold Masursky Award for Meritorious Service to Planetary Science
- Description: Award recognizing outstanding service to planetary science and exploration through engineering, managerial, programmatic, or public service activities
- Country: United States
- Presented by: Division for Planetary Sciences of the American Astronomical Society
- Website: https://dps.aas.org/prizes/masursky

The Harold Masursky Award for Meritorious Service to Planetary Science, usually called the Masursky Award, is awarded annually by the Division for Planetary Sciences (DPS) of the American Astronomical Society. The award for Meritorious Service to Planetary Science was established by the DPS to recognize and honor individuals who have rendered outstanding service to planetary science and exploration through engineering, managerial, programmatic, or public service activities. For purposes of this award, planetary science and exploration refers to the multidisciplinary study of the Solar System and its members, excluding work dealing primarily with the Sun or the Earth. It was named in honor of Harold Masursky. The award has been given annually since 1991, except 2001, 2002, and 2009.

== Recipients ==
Source: American Astronomical Society

- 1991 Carl Sagan
- 1992 Harlan James Smith
- 1993 Mildred S. Matthews
- 1994 Joseph A. Burns
- 1995 William E. Brunk
- 1996 William L. Quaide
- 1997 John T. Trauger
- 1998 Jurgen H. Rahe
- 1999 Wesley T. Huntress
- 2000 George Brown, Jr.
- 2001 No prize
- 2002 No prize
- 2003 Reta Beebe
- 2004 Alexander Basilevsky
- 2005 J. Kelly Beatty
- 2006 Gentry Lee
- 2007 Tom Gehrels
- 2008 Jon G. Giorgini
- 2009 No prize
- 2010 Alan Tokunaga
- 2011 Benton Clark III
- 2012 Susan Niebur
- 2013 Ronald Greeley
- 2014 Athena Coustenis
- 2015 Christina Richey
- 2016 Mark V. Sykes
- 2017 Louise Prockter
- 2018 Faith Vilas
- 2019 Phil Nicholson
- 2020 Heidi B. Hammel
- 2021 Mark Showalter
- 2022 Jim Green
- 2023 Dale Cruikshank
- 2024 Renee Dotson
- 2025 Rosaly Lopes
- 2026 Casey Drier and Jack Kiraly

== See also ==
- List of astronomy awards
