= Brunk =

Brunk may refer to:

- Brunk, Radeče a place in Slovenia
- 2499 Brunk a minor planet discovered in 1978
- Terry Brunk (1964–2025), American professional wrestler better known as Sabu
- William E. Brunk, American astronomer
