= Carrie Nugent =

American physicist and science communicator

- Born: Carrie Rosemary Nugent; 1984 (age 41–42)
- Education: University of California, Los Angeles
- Scientific career
- Workplaces: Infrared Processing and Analysis Center; Olin College
- Thesis: Solar Radiation and Near-Earth Asteroids: Thermophysical Modeling and New Measurements of the Yarkovsky Effect (2013)
- Doctoral advisor: Jean-Luc Margot

Carrie Nugent (born 1984) is an assistant professor of computational physics and planetary science at Olin College. She studies near-Earth objects. She is also a popular science communicator, and is a Senior TED Fellow. The asteroid 8801 Nugent was named after her.

== Early life and education ==
Nugent studied at Mira Costa High School, graduating in the class of 2002. She earned an undergraduate degree in physics. She studied geophysics at University of California, Los Angeles, and earned her PhD in 2013. She was supervised by Jean-Luc Margot and investigated the Yarkovsky effect. She served as an Infrared Processing and Analysis Center (IPAC) Fellow from 2015. She worked at the Summer App Space, a Los Angeles based apprenticeship for people to learn programming whilst working on space projects.

== Research and career ==
Nugent worked with the Near-Earth Object part of the NASA Wide-field Infrared Survey Explorer, known as NEOWISE. She was part of the Near-Earth Object Camera asteroid hunting teams. For this, Nugent was awarded the NASA Group Achievement Award. She believes asteroid impact is the only natural disaster that we can prevent. In 2015 she named an asteroid after Malala Yousafzai.

Nugent joined the faculty at Olin College as an assistant professor of computational physics and planetary science in 2018. She works on asteroid detection, and focuses on the identification of asteroids that could be a threat to Earth.

=== Public engagement ===
Nugent was a AAAS Mass Media Fellow in 2008. She was selected as a TED Fellow in 2016, and a Senior TED Fellow in 2018. Nugent delivered a TED talk Adventures of an asteroid hunter at the TED conference in 2016. After her TED talk, Nugent wrote the book Asteroid Hunters with Simon & Schuster. The talk was also used in a TED-Ed video. In her spare time she produces the podcast SpacePod. The podcast involves short episodes (15 minute in length) featuring relaxed conversations with space explorers. She serves as one of The Planetary Society experts. A question about Nugent's research was once included in Jeopardy!.

=== Awards and honours ===
- 2012 NEOWISE Team NASA Group Achievement Award
- 2013 8801 Nugent named in her honour
- 2017 Mira Costa High School Alumni Hall of Fame
- 2018 TED Senior Fellow
- 2019 Carl Sagan Medal

=== Books ===
Nugent, Carrie (2017). Asteroid Hunters. Simon & Schuster Ltd. ISBN 9781471162398.
