= Nicolle Zellner =

American planetary scientist

- Education: University of Wisconsin–Madison (B.S.); Rensselaer Polytechnic Institute (M.S.) (Ph.D.)
- Known for: Astronomy, Planetary Science, and Astrobiology research. As well as public outreach in space science and racial and gender minority recognition in STEM.
- Awards: Carl Sagan Medal for Excellence in Public Communication in Planetary Science; AAAS Fellow; Herbert H. and Grace A. Dow Trustees’ Professor in the Sciences at Albion College
- Scientific career
- Fields: Astronomy, Planetary Science, and Astrobiology
- Workplaces: Albion College

Nicolle Elisabeth Brigitte Zellner is an American astronomer, planetary scientist, and astrobiologist whose research concerns impact events on the Moon, especially during the Late Heavy Bombardment, the evidence for these impacts left in lunar glass, and the effects of impacts on the development of life on Earth. As well as for her research, she is known for her extensive efforts in the public outreach of space science. She is a professor of physics and Herbert H. and Grace A. Dow Trustees’ Professor in the Sciences at Albion College in Michigan.

== Education and career ==
Zellner studied physics and astronomy at the University of Wisconsin–Madison, graduating in 1993. As an undergraduate, she worked at the university's Pine Bluff Observatory. She credits Wisconsin astronomy researchers Marilyn Meade and Karen Bjorkman for inspiring her to aim for a career in academic astronomy.

After working at the university and at the Jet Propulsion Laboratory as a research scientist, she returned to graduate study in physics at the Rensselaer Polytechnic Institute. She earned a master's degree at Rensselaer in 1998, and completed her Ph.D. there in 2001. Her dissertation, Geochemistry of the Apollo landing sites and evidence for lunar impacts before 3.9 Ga ago, was jointly supervised by John Delano and Douglas Whittet.

Zellner was a postdoctoral researcher at Rensselaer and the Lawrence Livermore National Laboratory, also taking several adjunct faculty positions during this time. She became an assistant professor of physics at Albion College in 2005, was promoted to associate professor in 2010 and to full professor in 2017, and was given the Herbert and Grace Dow Endowed Professorship in the Sciences in 2019.

== Recognition ==
Zellner was a 2021 recipient of the Carl Sagan Medal for Excellence in Public Communication in Planetary Science, of the American Astronomical Society, "for her effective and wide-ranging outreach activities, reaching diverse audiences and spanning more than 20 years". She was named as an AAAS Fellow in 2022 by the American Association for the Advancement of Science.
