= Harold Masursky =

American geologist and astronomer (1922–1990)

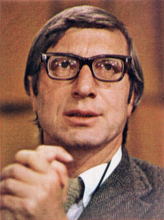
- Masursky c. 1980
- Born: December 23, 1922; Fort Wayne, Indiana, US
- Died: August 24, 1990 (aged 67); Flagstaff, Arizona, US
- Education: Yale University B.S., M.S.
- Known for: Planetary Science
- Awards: 4 NASA Exceptional Scientific Achievement Medals (1972, 1973, 1977 & 1980); Distinguished Service Award, Dept. of Interior (1985); Smithsonian Air & Space Museum Trophy for Lifetime Achievements (1988); G. K. Gilbert Award (1990)
- Scientific career
- Fields: Geology, Astrogeology
- Institutions: NASA, United States Geological Survey

Harold (Hal) Masursky /məˈzɜːrski/ (December 23, 1922* – August 24, 1990) was an American astrogeologist.

After leaving Yale University without defending his dissertation, he started his career in the early 1950s as a field geologist in Wyoming and Colorado working for the United States Geological Survey (USGS). In the early 1960s, he moved to the Astrogeology division of the USGS and began working at NASA's Jet Propulsion Laboratory in Pasadena, California. In the mid-1960s, he moved to Flagstaff, Arizona as a founding planetary geologist at the newly constructed USGS Astrogeology Science Center. Throughout his professional career with the USGS, his work contributed to the mission of NASA in the areas of economic, structural, and planetary geology.

He was responsible for the investigation of planetary and lunar surfaces, especially in finding scientifically valuable landing places. This included for the Apollo program, where, in the 1960s, he played a major role in choosing landing sites and assisted in training astronauts in the basics of geology so they would know what to look for on the surface of the Moon. In the 1970s, he headed the team that mapped the surface of Mars and was once again involved in choosing landing sites, this time for the Mars Viking missions. In the 1980s, he worked with the Voyager program to explore the surfaces of Jupiter, Saturn, Uranus, and Neptune.

Masursky was a strong advocate for the exploration of Venus and he was a key member of Pioneer Venus Orbiter team. He worked on numerous other space missions and programs, including, for Moon exploration, Ranger, Surveyor, the Lunar Orbiter, and the mapping of Mars by Mariner 9, as well as contributing to the missions of the Galileo and Magellan spacecraft. He was often interviewed on television as his enthusiasm for the planetary discoveries of the space missions was both edifying and infectious

An especially key role was his work as the president of the Working Group for Planetary System Nomenclature of the International Astronomical Union (IAU). He created a small stir in 1986, when he was required to reject a popular suggestion that new moons of Uranus, discovered earlier that year, be named for the seven astronauts lost in the Space Shuttle Challenger explosion - the IAU has strict guidelines that prohibit major bodies being named in honor of persons from a particular country.

In 1985, Masursky was the recipient of the Distinguished Service Award, which is the highest honorary recognition an employee can receive within the Department of the Interior. Quoting from the award, the 1985 USGS Yearbook states: “Harold Masursky, Geologist, for his imaginative leadership in the field of astrogeology which has influenced almost every facet of lunar and planetary exploration since the beginning of the nation's space program.”

The Masursky crater on Mars was chosen because it is effluvial, meaning "flow" (it looks like water ran through it), to honor his fervent belief that Mars once had flowing water on the surface. In 1981, the asteroid 2685 Masursky was discovered and named in his honor. The Masursky Award for Meritorius Service to Planetary Science, first awarded to Carl Sagan in 1991, and the Masursky Lecture, originating in 1992 and given during the annual Lunar and Planetary Science Conference (LPSC), are named for him as well.

Upon his death in Flagstaff, Arizona, he was buried in the city's Citizens Cemetery.

*Note there is some confusion about the year of Harold Masursky's birth; in some places it is reported as 1922 and in some places is reported as 1923.

== Awards ==
- 1972 NASA Honor Award: Exceptional Scientific Achievement Medal; Johnson Space Center
- 1973 NASA Honor Award: Exceptional Scientific Achievement Medal; Johnson Space Center
- 1977 NASA Honor Award: Exceptional Scientific Achievement Medal; Johnson Space Center
- 1980 NASA Honor Award: Exceptional Scientific Achievement Medal; Johnson Space Center
- 1981 Honorary D.Sc. degree conferred by Northern Arizona University
- 1985 Department of the Interior Distinguished Service Award (gold medal).
- 1988 Smithsonian Air and Space Museum Trophy for Lifetime Achievements in Lunar and Planetary Exploration (in 2020 renamed “The Michael Collins Trophy”)
- 1990 G. K. Gilbert Award from the Geological Society of America for outstanding contributions to the solution of fundamental problems in planetary geology
- 1990 JPL-NASA Magellan Mission Award Plaque For Exceptional Contributions in the Exploration of Venus (posthumous award presented by Jet Propulsion Lab)

== Legacy ==
- Harold Masursky Award for Meritorious Service to Planetary Science, usually called the Masursky Award, is awarded annually by the Division for Planetary Sciences (DPS) of the American Astronomical Society.
- The Harold Masursky Lecture Series began in 1992, as a tribute to his work, and is sponsored by the Lunar and Planetary Science Conference.
- 2685 Masursky, a main-belt asteroid discovered in 1981 by Edward Bowell was named in honor of him.

== Selected publications ==
- Masursky, Harold, J. M. Boyce, A. L. Dial, G. G. Schaber, and M. E. Strobell. "Classification and time of formation of Martian channels based on Viking data." Journal of Geophysical Research 82, no. 28 (1977): 4016–4038.
- Masursky, Harold, George Willis Colton, and Farouk El-Baz. "Apollo over the Moon: a view from orbit". Vol. 362. Scientific and Technical Information Office, National Aeronautics and Space Administration, 1978.
- Masursky, Harold, Eric Eliason, Peter G. Ford, George E. McGill, Gordon H. Pettengill, Gerald G. Schaber, and Gerald Schubert. "Pioneer Venus radar results: Geology from images and altimetry." Journal of Geophysical Research: Space Physics 85, no. A13 (1980): 8232–8260.
- Smith, Bradford A., Laurence Soderblom, Reta Beebe, Joseph Boyce, Geoffery Briggs, Anne Bunker, Stewart A. Collins et al. "Encounter with Saturn: Voyager 1 imaging science results." Science 212, no. 4491 (1981): 163–191.
- Smith, Bradford A., Laurence Soderblom, Raymond Batson, Patricia Bridges, J. A. Y. Inge, Harold Masursky, Eugene Shoemaker et al. "A new look at the Saturn system: The Voyager 2 images." Science 215, no. 4532 (1982): 504–537.
