= Caleb Scharf =

English astronomer

- Born: Caleb Asa Scharf
- Citizenship: British and American
- Education: Durham University (BSc); University of Cambridge (PhD)
- Awards: Carl Sagan Medal (2022)
- Scientific career
- Fields: Cosmology and Astrobiology
- Workplaces: Columbia University

Caleb Asa Scharf is a British-American astronomer and popular science author. He is currently the senior scientist for astrobiology at the NASA Ames Research Center in Mountain View, California. He formerly served as the director of the multidisciplinary Columbia Astrobiology Center at Columbia University, New York.

Also active as a science communicator, Scharf was the 2022 recipient of the Carl Sagan Medal, awarded by the American Astronomical Society for excellence in public communication of planetary science.

== Early life and education ==
He received a B.Sc. in Physics from Durham University and a PhD in Astronomy from the University of Cambridge.

== Research ==
Scharf conducted postdoctoral work in X-ray astronomy and observational cosmology at the NASA Goddard Space Flight Center and the Space Telescope Science Institute in Maryland.

He has an extensive research record in observational cosmology but more recently works on topics in exoplanetary science and astrobiology.

== Writing ==
He is the author of the upper-level undergraduate textbook Extrasolar Planets and Astrobiology, published in 2008 by University Science Books, CA. This book won the 2011 Chambliss Astronomical Writing Award and medal from the American Astronomical Society. He has many published professional papers in peer-reviewed journals, with 109 papers listed in the SAO/NASA Astrophysics Data System (ADS); three have been cited over 100 times each: the highest counts are 264 139, 116, all in The Astrophysical Journal.

His blog Life, Unbounded appears at Scientific American and covers topics in astronomy, exoplanetary science, and astrobiology.

Scharf is the author of a number of popular science books. Gravity's Engines: The Other Side of Black Holes (US subtitle: How Bubble-Blowing Black Holes Rule Galaxies, Stars, and Life in the Universe) was published in December 2012. It was listed as one of the New Scientist top 10 books to read in 2012 and as one of The Barnes and Noble Review Editors' Picks: Best Nonfiction of 2012. His next book, The Copernicus Complex, was published in 2014 by Farrar, Straus and Giroux, and in 2017 The Zoomable Universe, with illustrations by Ron Miller, was published by Scientific American/Farrar, Straus and Giroux.

== Bibliography ==
=== Textbooks ===
- Scharf, Caleb A. (2008). Extrasolar planets and astrobiology. Sausalito: University Science Books.

=== Popular Science ===
- Scharf, Caleb A. (2012). Gravity's Engines: The Other Side of Black Holes (US subtitle: How Bubble-Blowing Black Holes Rules Galaxies, Stars, and Life in the Universe).
- Scharf, Caleb A. (2014). The Copernicus Complex: Our Cosmic Significance in a Universe of Planets and Probabilities. New York: Scientific American / Farrar, Straus and Giroux.
- Scharf, Caleb A.; illustrations by Ron Miller (2017). The Zoomable Universe: An Epic Tour Through Cosmic Scale, from Almost Everything to Nearly Nothing. New York: Scientific American / Farrar, Straus and Giroux.
- Scharf, Caleb A. (2021); The Ascent of Information: Books, Bits, Genes, Machines, and Life's Unending Algorithm.

Riverhead Books.

=== Essays and reporting ===
- Scharf, Caleb A. (May 2013). "Space race : a comparison of the speediest spacecraft". Advances. Best of the Blogs. Scientific American. 308 (5): 18. doi:10.1038/scientificamerican0513-24b.
