= André Brahic =

French astrophysicist (1942–2016)

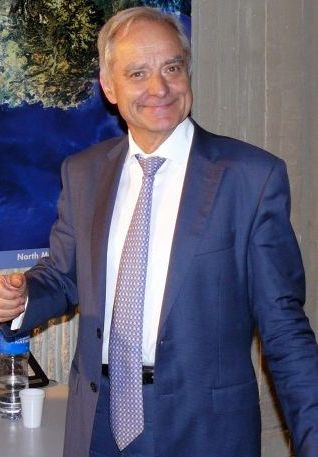
- Brahic at the Cannes Mandelieu Space Center (2009)
- Born: André Fernand Brahic; 30 November 1942; Paris, France
- Died: 15 May 2016 (aged 73); Paris, France
- Known for: Discovering the rings of Neptune
- Awards: Carl Sagan Medal (2001)
- Scientific career
- Fields: Astrophysics
- Workplaces: University of Paris

André Fernand Brahic (30 November 1942 – 15 May 2016) was a French astrophysicist. He is known for his discovery (1984) of the rings of Neptune.

== Biography ==
Brahic was born in 1942 in Paris. His family originated from the coal mining village of Petit-Brahic in the Banne commune of southern France. Brahic had stated that many of his ancestors died of silicosis, but his father quit the mines to work for the railway industry.

Brahic was first introduced into the field of astrophysics by Evry Schatzman, one of the foremost astrophysicist in France at the time.

In the 1980s, Brahic became a specialist in exploring the Solar System NASA Voyager program and the Cassini spacecraft.

Brahic was a member of the French Alternative Energies and Atomic Energy Commission and a professor at the University of Paris. He was also on the imaging team for the Cassini–Huygens spacecraft.

Brahic wrote several books, explaining astrophysics to the general audience. His last book "Worlds Elsewhere; Are We Alone" was published in 2015.

Brahic died of cancer in Paris on 15 May 2016. He was 73.

== Discovery of the Rings of Neptune ==
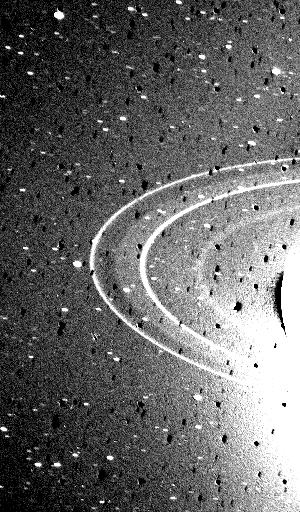
Neptune Ring

The rings of Neptune were first discovered (as "arcs") in 1984 at European Southern Observatory and at Cerro Tololo Interamerican Observatory by André Brahic's and William Hubbard's team.

Brahic named the arcs, known today as parts of the Adams ring - Liberté, Égalité, and Fraternité (Liberty, Equality, and Fraternity), after the national motto of France.

== Awards and honors ==
In 1990, the asteroid 3488 Brahic was named in his honor.

In 2001, he was given the Carl Sagan Medal.
