= Heidi Hammel =

Planetary astronomer

Heidi h. Hammel
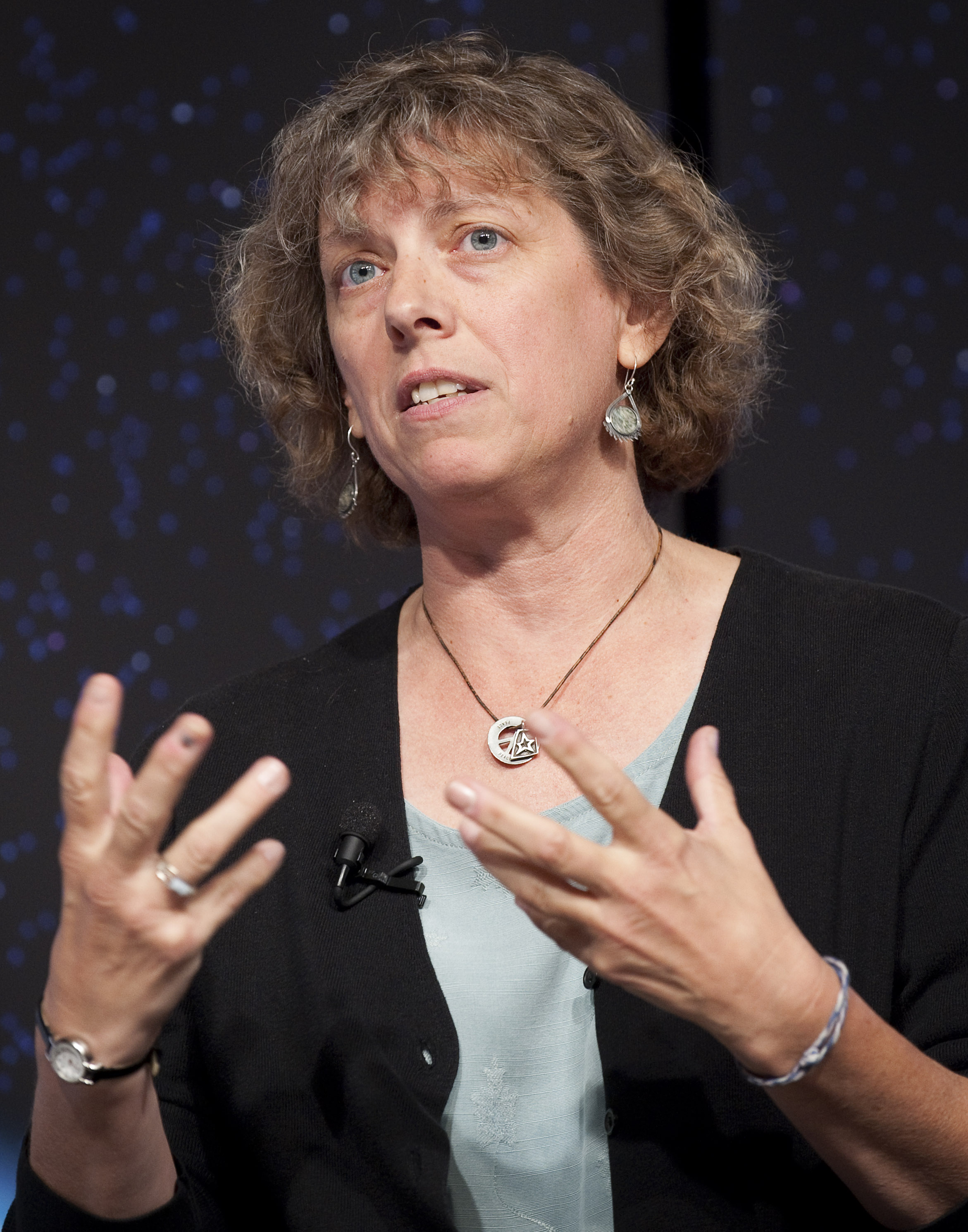
- Hammel speaking at NASA Headquarters in 2009
- Born: March 14, 1960 (age 66); California
- Education: University of Hawaii (PhD); Massachusetts Institute of Technology (Bachelor)
- Awards: Klumpke-Roberts Award (1995); Harold C. Urey Prize (1996); Carl Sagan Medal (2002)
- Scientific career
- Fields: Planetary science Astronomy; Geology
- Workplaces: Space Science Institute; Massachusetts Institute of Technology

External videos
- "Target: Jupiter: Heidi B. Hammel at ANU", September 2011
- "Heidi Hammel: Becoming an Astronomer", Apr 23, 2012

Heidi B. Hammel (born March 14, 1960) is an American planetary astronomer who has extensively studied Neptune and Uranus. She was part of the team imaging Neptune from Voyager 2 in 1989. She led the team using the Hubble Space Telescope to view Shoemaker-Levy 9's impact with Jupiter in 1994. She has used the Hubble Space Telescope and the Keck Telescope to study Uranus and Neptune, discovering new information about dark spots, planetary storms and Uranus' rings. In 2002, she was selected as an interdisciplinary scientist for the James Webb Space Telescope.

Hammel spends increasing time as a science communicator. She is the 2002 recipient of the Carl Sagan Medal given to a scientist whose communications have greatly enhanced the general public's understanding of planetary science. She was one of Discover Magazine's 50 most important women in science in 2003. In addition to her public-facing work at NASA, she became the executive vice president of the Association of Universities for Research in Astronomy (AURA) in 2010.

== Personal life ==
Hammel was born in California and is the mother of three children.

== Education ==
Hammel received her undergraduate degree from the Massachusetts Institute of Technology (MIT) in 1982 and her Ph.D. in physics and astronomy from the University of Hawaii in 1988. After a post-doctoral position at NASA's Jet Propulsion Laboratory, Pasadena, California, Hammel returned to MIT, where she spent nearly nine years as a principal research scientist in the Department of Earth, Atmospheric, and Planetary Sciences.

== Career ==
Hammel was the executive vice president of the Association of Universities for Research in Astronomy (AURA), a consortium of 44 US members (universities as well as educational and non-profit institutions) and 5 international affiliates. AURA operates world-class astronomical observatories including the Hubble Space Telescope, the National Optical Astronomy Observatory, the National Solar Observatory, and the Gemini Observatory. Hammel became the executive vice president of the Association of Universities for Research in Astronomy (AURA) in 2010. Hammel says she realized about 15 years into her career that people were needed in the scientific community who plan for and work towards the future of science.

I made a commitment several years ago to move from the doing of the research to the enabling of the research... I want to make sure that ... young people have the opportunities, with the new tools that we're developing right now, to push the boundaries of science.

Prior to her appointment at AURA, Hammel was employed as a senior research scientist and co-director of research at the Space Science Institute in Boulder, Colorado. In 2002, she was selected as an interdisciplinary scientist for the Hubble Space Telescope's successor, the James Webb Space Telescope, which launched in 2021. She was also a member of the Science Working Group for the giant segmented mirror telescope. She served on the joint NASA/NSF Exoplanet Taskforce, and on the Science and Technology Definition Team for NASA's Terrestrial planet Finder Coronograph mission.

== Research ==
Hammel's main areas of interest are ground and space-based astronomical observations of outer planets' atmospheres and satellites at visible and near infrared wavelengths utilizing Adaptive optics (AO) technology.

Hammel has described her own research by saying:

"One thing that we all care about is the weather, and we care about the weather on the Earth the most. But what makes weather is gases and clouds, and the reason the weather on the Earth is hard to predict is because we have oceans and continents that interact with our atmosphere. That makes it very hard to predict the weather, as we all know. But if you take a planet like Jupiter or Neptune you don't have continents and you don't have oceans. All you have is gas, all you have is atmosphere, and therefore it's a lot easier to model the weather on those planets. But it's the same physical process, it's the same kind of thing happening, whether it happens on the Earth or whether it happens on Neptune. Therefore by studying weather on Neptune we learn about weather in general, and that helps us understand the weather on Earth better".

The Hubble Space Telescope and the Keck Telescope with its new adaptive optics changed how planetary astronomers look at Uranus and Neptune. With Hubble's advanced cameras and improvements to the adaptive optics systems of the Keck telescope, astronomers became able to capture "unbelievably crisp images" and view many details that could not be seen before. Hammel's planetary research with Hubble and Keck has demonstrated that both Uranus and Neptune are dynamic worlds.

=== Voyager 2, Neptune ===
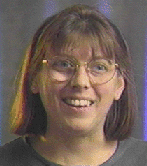
Hammel in 1995

Hammel primarily studies the outer planets and their satellites, focusing on observational techniques. She was a member of the Imaging Science Team for the Voyager 2 encounter with the planet Neptune in 1989.

=== Shoemaker-Levy 9, Jupiter ===
In 1994, Hammel led the team that investigated Jupiter's visible wavelength response to the impact of comet Shoemaker-Levy 9 using the Hubble Space Telescope. As the leader of the ground team Hammel analyzed photos of this event taken from the Hubble Space Telescope. Hammel was the National Aeronautics and Space Administration's public face, explaining the science to television audiences worldwide.

=== Great Dark Spot, Neptune ===
Hammel was on the team that first spotted Neptune's Great Dark Spot, a raging storm as big as Earth, and she led the Hubble Space Telescope team that documented the Great Dark Spot's disappearance after just a few years, in 1994.

=== Weather and rings, Uranus ===
With colleague Imke de Pater, Heidi Hammel has been studying Uranus with the Keck telescope since 2000. Hammel reported clocking the fastest winds ever recorded on Uranus, roaring along between 107 and 111 meters per second (240 and 260 miles per hour); the winds were measured in October 2003 on the northernmost parts of the planet visible at that time.

Hammel discovered that Uranus' nine main rings comprise a single layer of particles, something not found in other rings. With the super-sharp optics system used at the W. M. Keck Observatory, de Pater and Hammel found an 11th ring around Uranus, a narrow sheet of rocky debris. The ring, the innermost of its siblings, is about 3,500 kilometers (2,200 mi) wide and centered about 39,600 kilometers (24,600 mi) from the planet's core. The ring was visible because its edge-on position to the sun and Earth reflected more light than the more typical face-on view. In 2006, they also reported that Uranus had both an extremely rare blue ring, as well as a red ring.

As of 2014, her most recent research involved the imaging of Neptune and Uranus with the use of the Hubble Space Telescope, W. M. Keck Observatory, Mauna Kea Observatory, the NASA Infrared Telescope Facility (IRTF), Mauna Kea and other Earth-based observatories.

== Recognition and public outreach ==
Hammel has been awarded prizes both for her research (including the 1996 Harold C. Urey Prize of the American Astronomical Society Division for Planetary Sciences) and for her public outreach (such as the San Francisco Exploratorium's 1998 Public Understanding of Science Award). Hammel was elected a Fellow of the American Association for the Advancement of Science in 2000. She has also been lauded for her work in public outreach, including the 2002 Carl Sagan Medal for outstanding communication by an active planetary scientist to the general public; the Astronomical Society of the Pacific's 1995 Klumpke-Roberts Award for public understanding and appreciation of astronomy; and the 1996 "Spirit of American Women" National Award for encouraging young women to follow non-traditional career paths.

In acknowledgment of her many achievements, Discover Magazine recognized Hammel in 2002 as one of the 50 most important women in science. Her biography "Beyond Jupiter: The Story of Planetary Astronomer Heidi Hammel" has been published by the United States National Academy of Sciences as part of the series "Women's Adventures in Science".

Hammel joined The Planetary Society's Board of Directors in 2005. On May 7, 2009 the Women's Board of the Adler Planetarium awarded Hammel with the 2009 Women in Space Science Award.

In June 2010, Hammel participated in the World Science Festival held in New York City, by the James Webb Space Telescope model in Battery Park. Hammel talked about the discoveries anticipated in 2014 with the launching of the James Webb Space Telescope, which will be the world's most powerful space telescope, being the successor to the Hubble Space Telescope. Other speakers included John C. Mather, a Nobel laureate and the Webb telescope's senior project scientist and Dr. John Grunsfeld, astronaut, physicist and "chief repairman" of the Hubble Space Telescope.

On November 2, 2010, The Association of Universities for Research in Astronomy announced the appointment of Hammel to the position of executive vice president. Hammel began her appointment on January 1, 2011. In accepting this appointment, Hammel said:

The United States astronomical community stands at an interesting juncture with many possible paths ahead of us. I look forward to working with AURA as we confront these challenges. Our shared goal is a rich future for astronomy and astrophysics, giving the next generation of scientists new opportunities to explore the universe.

The asteroid 3530 Hammel was named in her honor in 1996.

== Filmography ==
- The Planets and Beyond, 2018 TV episode on the Science Channel
- Uranus & Neptune: Rise of the Ice Giants, 2018 TV episode in How the Universe Works, herself as Astronomer
- Hubble's Cosmic Journey, 2015 TV episode on the National Geographic Channel
- Naked Science, 2006–2008 2 TV episodes on the National Geographic Channel
- Hubble's Amazing Universe, 2008 TV episode
- Deadliest Planets, 2006 TV episode, as Dr. Heidi B. Hammel, senior research scientist
- Hubble: Secrets from Space, 1998 TV episode, as Professor Heidi Hammel

== Personal quotes ==
Why do astronomy? Because it can answer the fundamental question, what is the fate of the universe?

It made plumes of gases that rose 1,000 miles high. Jupiter was covered with atmospheric soot. If that impact had happened on Earth, we all would have died. It would have created a major disruption of the biosphere. This is what we think happened to the dinosaurs. (On Jupiter's atmospheric response to the comet collision of 1994)

I am fascinated by the delicate balance of external radiation from the Sun and the internal heat from these planets. This balance seems metastable, particular for Uranus but also for Neptune, leading to detectable signatures in their atmospheric activity of the seasons and solar activity. We do not fully understand the physical processes involved in the balance, and yet it is the same balance that occurs in the Earth's atmosphere. In other words, by studying other planets, we learn about Earth, and knowledge of Earth is incredibly important to us as a species. (On studying Uranus and Neptune, September 2010).

== See also ==
- List of women in leadership positions on astronomical instrumentation projects
