= Space Science Institute =

Space organization

Coordinates: 40°1′10″N 105°14′24″W

- Logo of the Space Science Institute
- Abbreviation: SSI
- Formation: 1992
- Type: Research, 501(c)3 Education
- Tax ID no.: 84-1215290
- Purpose: "Discover, Educate, Inspire"
- Headquarters: Boulder, Colorado, United States
- Members: 50+
- Official language: English
- President: Bill Purcell
- Website: www.spacescience.org

The Space Science Institute (SSI) in Boulder, Colorado, is a nonprofit, public-benefit corporation formed in 1992. Its purpose is to create and maintain an environment where scientific research and education programs can flourish in an integrated fashion. SSI is among the four non-profit institutes in the US cited in a 2007 report by Nature, including Southwest Research Institute, Planetary Science Institute, and Eureka Scientific, which manage federal grants for non-tenure-track astronomers.

== Description ==
SSI's research program covers the following areas: space physics, earth science, planetary science, and astrophysics. The flight operations branch manages the Cassini-Huygens spacecraft's visible camera instrument and provides spectacular images of Saturn and its moons and rings to the public. SSI participates in mission operations and is home to the Cassini Imaging Central Laboratory for OPerations (CICLOPS).

The primary goal of SSI is to bring together researchers and educators to improve science education. Toward this end, the institute acts as an umbrella for researchers who wish to be independent of universities. In addition, it works with educators directly to improve teaching methods for astronomy. SSI has also produced several traveling exhibits for science museums, including Electric Space, Mars Quest, and Alien Earths. It is currently producing Giant Worlds.

SSI provides management support for research scientists and principal investigators, which help them to submit proposals to major public funding agencies such as National Aeronautics and Space Administration (NASA), National Science Foundation (NSF), Space Telescope Science Institute (STSci), Department of Energy (DOE), and Jet Propulsion Laboratory (JPL) principal investigators are supported by SSI though proposal budget preparation, proposal submission, and project reporting tools, and have competitive negotiated overhead rates.

The institute is loosely affiliated with the University of Colorado Boulder. SSI has obtained several grants in astrophysical sciences since 1992 from NSF and NASA funding agencies.

== Divisions ==
SSI has five research centers:

- Center for Space Plasma Physics (CSPP),
- Center for Extrasolar Planetary Systems (CEPS),
- Center for Mars Science (CMS),
- Center for Polarimetric Remote Sensing (CPRS),
- Center for Data Science (CDS).

SSI's National Center for Interactive Learning (NCIL) is dedicated to expanding the understanding of educators, and citizens in science through educational and outreach programs by SSI researchers in four interconnected groups: Exhibition Development, Digital Learning, Professional Development, and Public Engagement.

SSI is managed by a board of 12 directors for Aerospace, Academic Research, Small Business Consultant, Astronomy, Science and Technology, Engineering, Civil Space, Martin, Planetarium, Innovation, Legal and Policy, and 4 acting directors for Research, National Center for Interactive Learning (NCIL), Information Systems and Technology (IST), and Business Operations.

== Gallery ==
SSI has participated in NASA's Cassini mission and hosted the Cassini Imaging Central Laboratory for OPerations (CICLOPS).

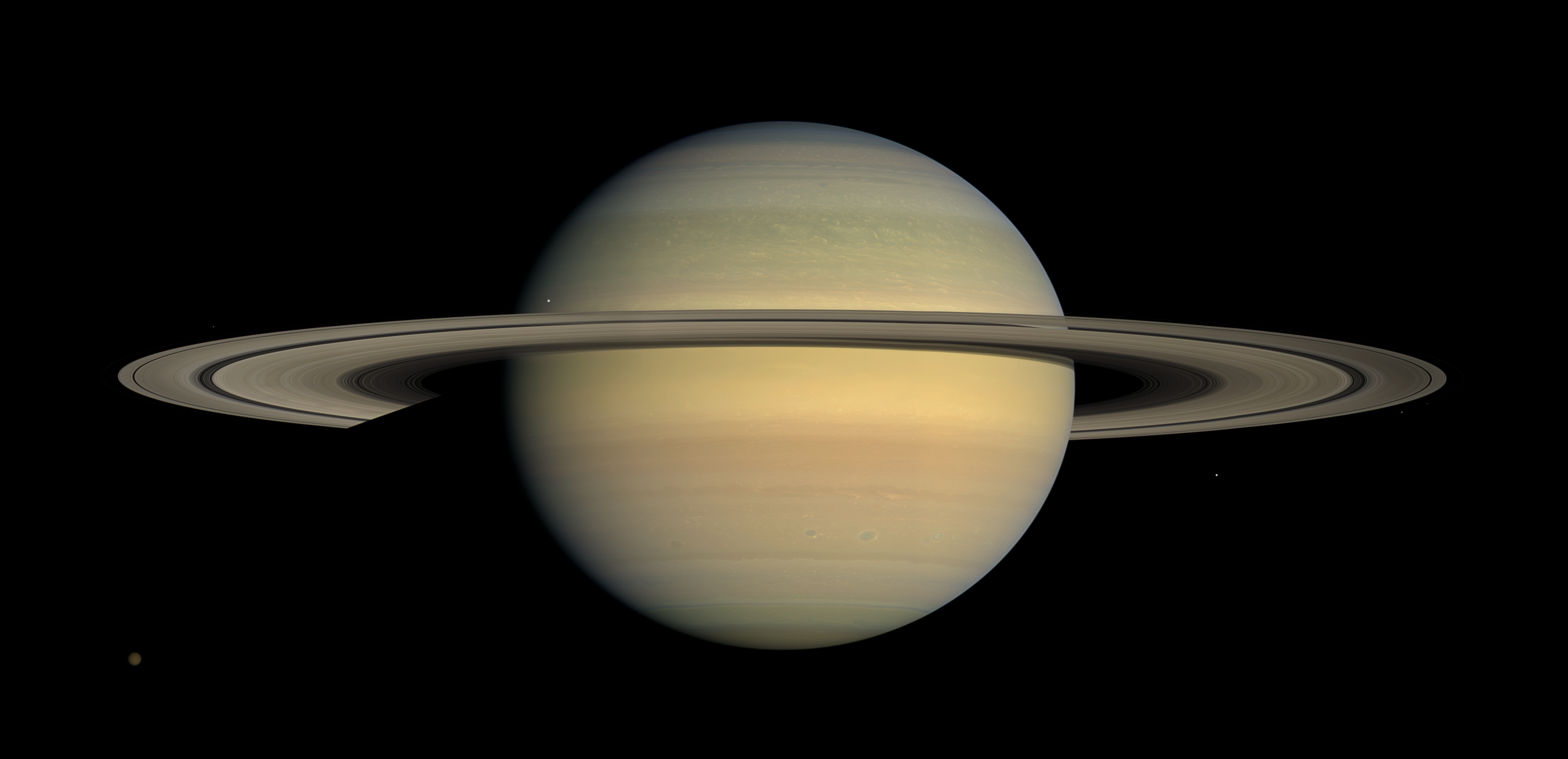
NASA's Cassini color view of the planet Saturn

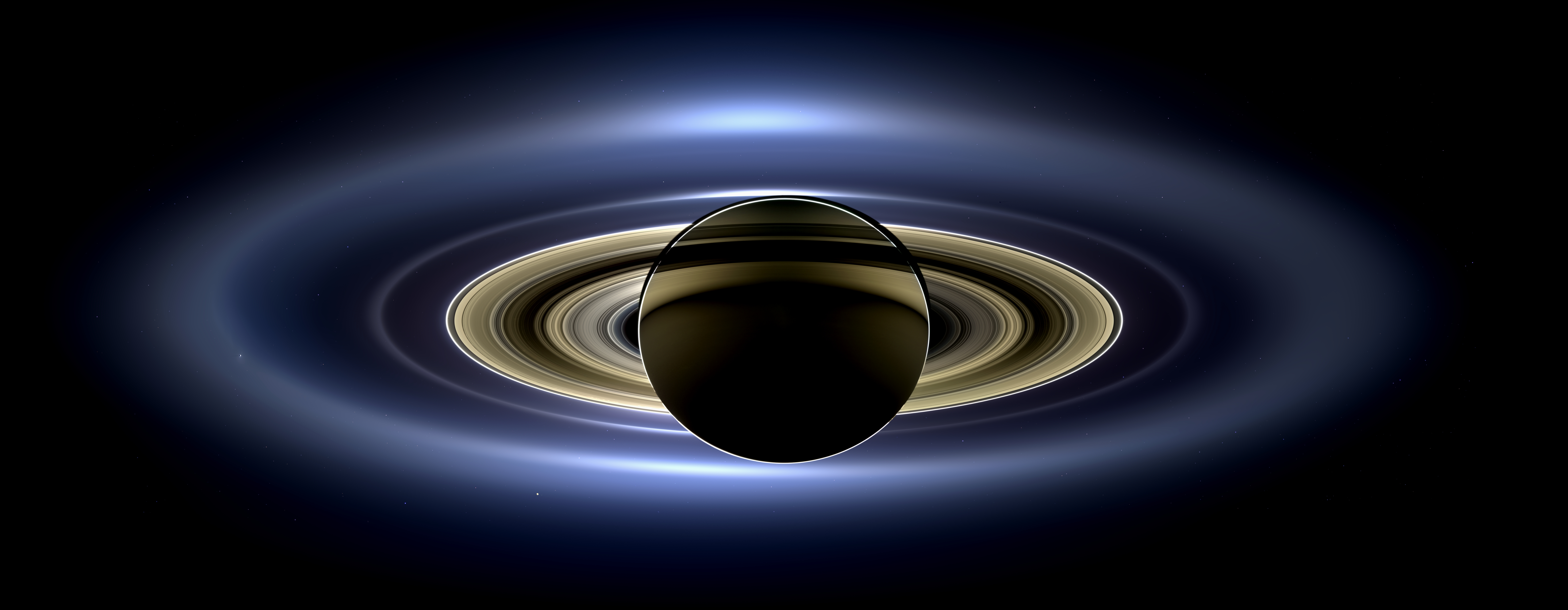
NASA's Cassini image of Saturn

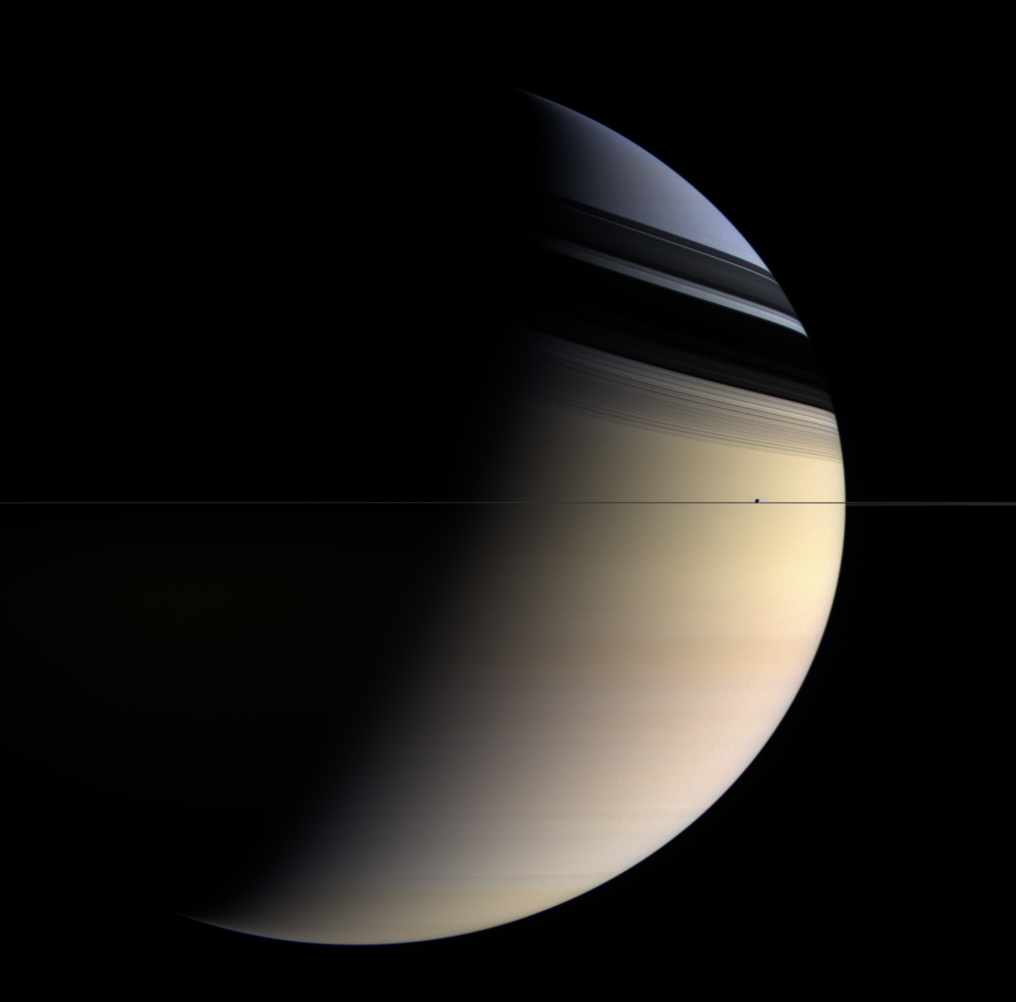
Cassini-Huygens Image of Saturn's Subtle Spectrum

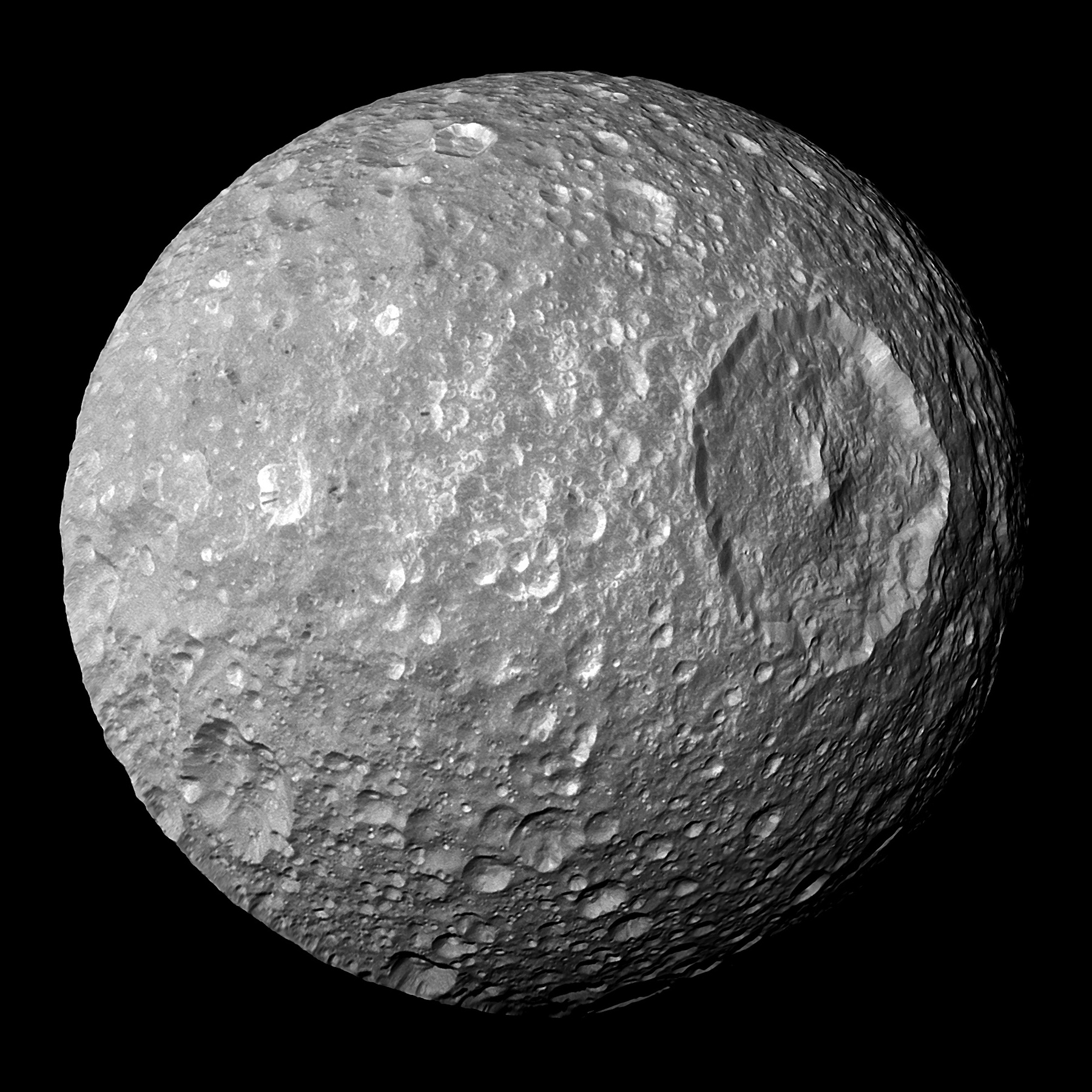
NASA's Cassini image of Saturn's moon Mimas

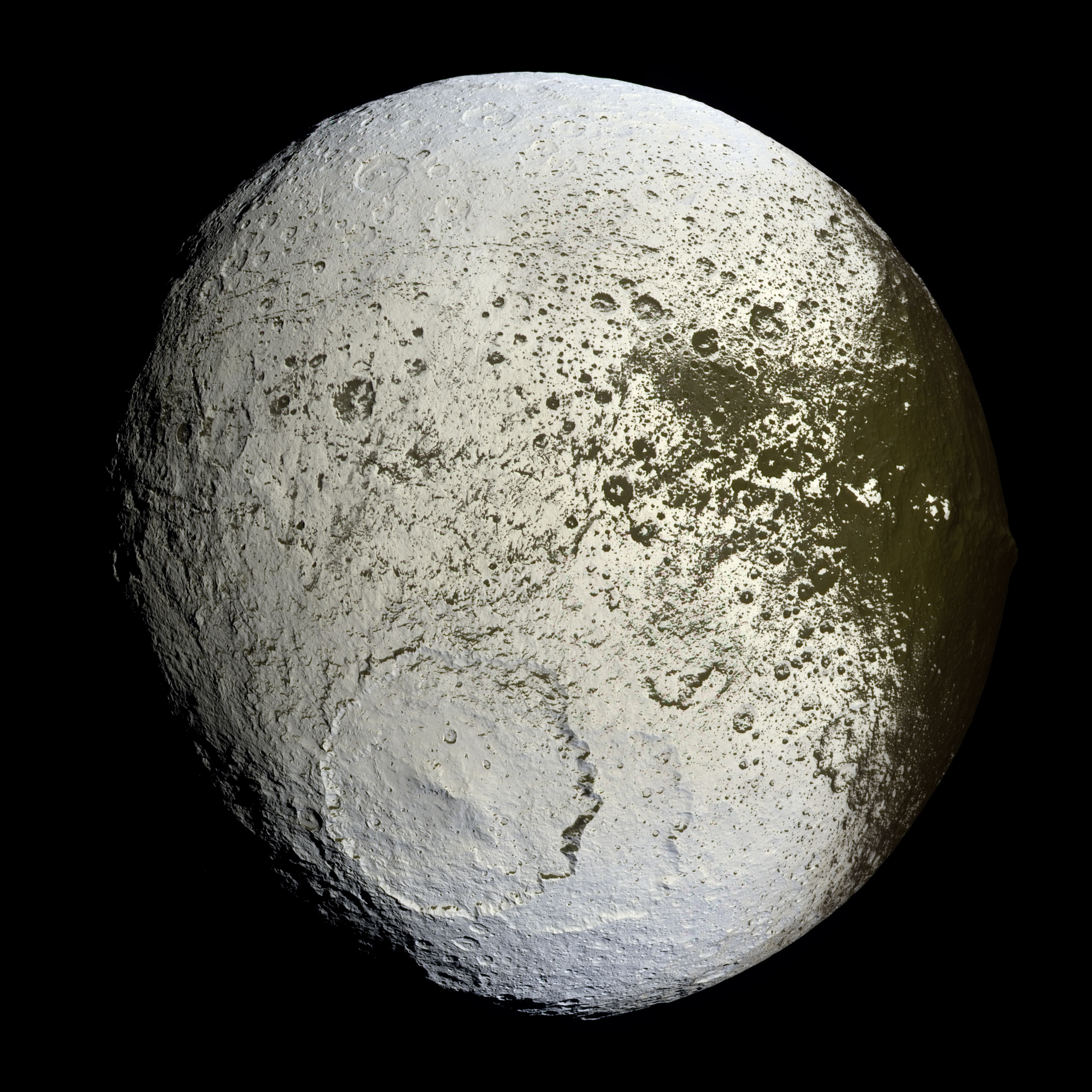
NASA's Cassini image of Saturn's moon Iapetus

== See also ==
- Heidi Hammel
- Carolyn Porco
- Associated Universities, Inc.
- Planetary Science Institute
- Space Studies Institute
- Southwest Research Institute
