= Carl Sagan Medal =

American planetary science communication award

The Carl Sagan Medal for Excellence in Public Communication in Planetary Science is an award established by the Division for Planetary Sciences of the American Astronomical Society to recognize and honor outstanding communication by an active planetary scientist to the general public. It is awarded to scientists whose efforts have significantly contributed to a public understanding of, and enthusiasm for planetary science.

== Carl Sagan Medal winners ==
- 1998 William K. Hartmann
- 1999 Clark Chapman
- 2000 Larry Lebofsky
- 2001 André Brahic
- 2002 Heidi Hammel
- 2003 No award
- 2004 David Morrison
- 2005 Rosaly Lopes
- 2006 David Grinspoon
- 2007 No award
- 2008 G. Jeffrey Taylor
- 2009 Steven Squyres
- 2010 Carolyn Porco
- 2011 James F. Bell, III
- 2012 Patrick Michel
- 2013 Donald K. Yeomans
- 2014 Guy J. Consolmagno, S.J.
- 2015 Daniel D. Durda
- 2016 Yong-Chun Zheng
- 2017 Megan Schwamb and Henry Throop
- 2018 Bonnie Buratti
- 2019 Carrie Nugent
- 2020 Ray Jayawardhana
- 2021 Nicolle Zellner and Adam Frank
- 2022 Caleb Scharf
- 2023 Tracy Becker
- 2024 Jamie Molaro
- 2025 Lisa Kaltenegger
- 2026 James O’Donoghue

== See also ==
- List of astronomy awards
