= Rosaly Lopes =

Brazilian geologist (born 1957)

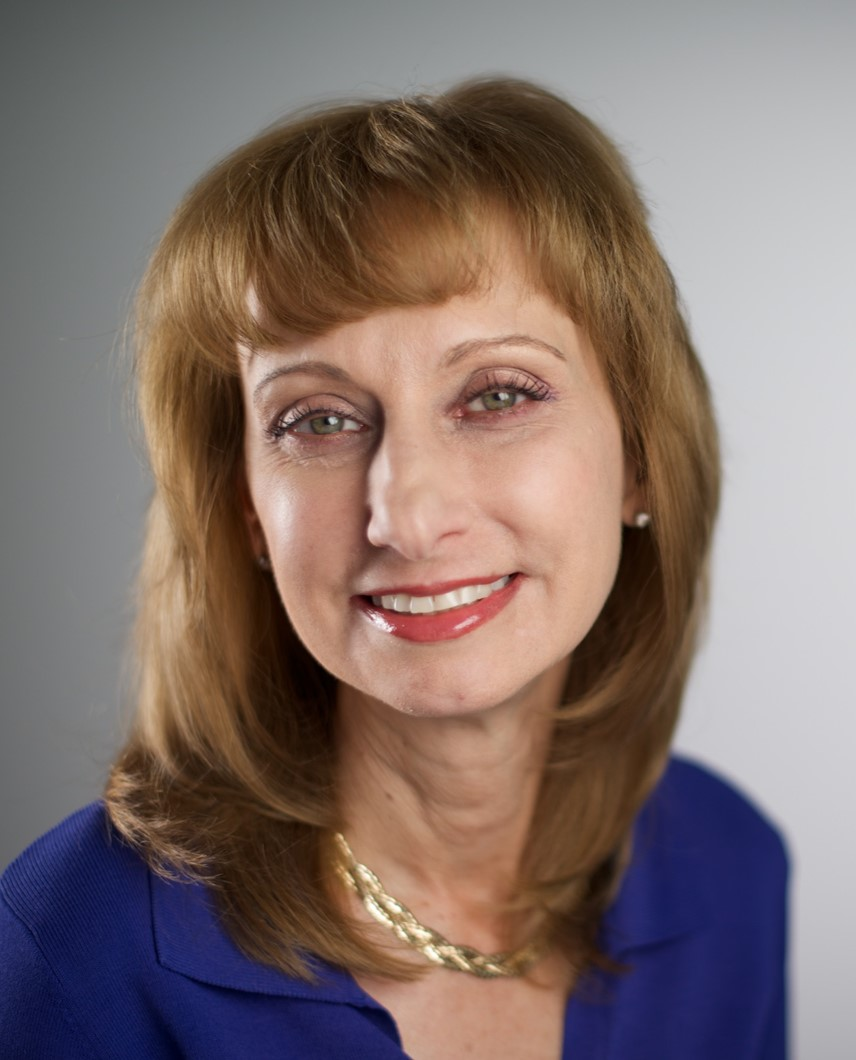
- Born: Rosaly M. C. Lopes; January 8, 1957 (age 69); Rio de Janeiro
- Other name: Rosaly M. C. Lopes-Gautier
- Education: University College, University of London
- Awards: 2005 Carl Sagan Medal; 2014 Lowell Thomas award from The Explorers Club; AGU Ambassador Award (2018)
- Scientific career
- Fields: Planetary geologist, volcanologist
- Workplaces: Jet Propulsion Laboratory, NASA
- Website: science.jpl.nasa.gov/people/Lopes

External videos
- "Women at JPL – Rosaly Lopes, Planetary Geologist", Jet Propulsion Laboratory, NASA
- "Through the Eyes of Scientists – Meet Rosaly Lopes", Jet Propulsion Laboratory, NASA

Rosaly M. C. Lopes (born January 8, 1957) is a planetary geologist, volcanologist, an author of numerous scientific papers and several books, as well as a proponent of education. Her major research interests are in planetary and terrestrial surface processes with an emphasis on volcanology.

== Life and scientific career ==
Lopes was born in Rio de Janeiro, Brazil, and in her early life, lived near the neighborhood of Ipanema. Inspired in part by NASA's Poppy Northcutt, she moved to London in England in 1975 to study astronomy at the University of London. She graduated with honours in astronomy in 1978. During her final semester, she took a planetary science course with John Guest – and three weeks into the course, Mount Etna exploded. Lopes decided to change her field of study to volcanoes, on earth and in space.

For her doctoral studies, she specialized in planetary geology and volcanology, completing her PhD in Planetary Science in 1986 with a thesis on comparing volcanic processes on Earth and Mars. During her PhD she travelled extensively to active volcanoes and became a member of the UK's Volcanic Eruption Surveillance Team. Her first experience of an active volcano was of Mount Etna in Sicily in 1979.

Lopes began her post doctorate career as the Curator of Modern Astronomy and Deputy Head of the Astronomy Section at the Old Royal Observatory in Greenwich, UK. In 1989 she performed hazard mapping at the Vesuvius Observatory in Naples, Italy as a Visiting Researcher.

She joined the Jet Propulsion Laboratory in Pasadena, California as a National Research Council Resident Research Associate in 1989 and, after two years, became a member of the Galileo spacecraft project. She worked on the Near Infra-red Mapping Spectrometer (NIMS) team planning and analyzing observations of Jupiter's volcanic moon Io from 1996 to 2001. She discovered 71 volcanoes on Io that had never before been detected as active.

In 2002, she became Investigation Scientist on the RADAR Team supporting the Saturn-orbiting Cassini spacecraft. She planned science observations of Saturn, its moons, and rings, and co-chaired the Cassini Satellites Orbiter Science Team from 2003 to 2010. Her main interest on Cassini is in Saturn's largest moon Titan. The synthetic aperture radar data from the RADAR instrument show that Titan has volcanic features, but not like silicate volcanism on the Earth or Io. Titan's flows and other volcanic features are likely the result of ice volcanism (cryovolcanism).

She has participated in several studies of future NASA and European Space Agency missions as a member of the science definition team, including missions to Saturn and Titan. She serves on several committees, including the Annual Program Committee of the American Association for the Advancement of Science (AAAS), and the American Astronomical Society's Division for Planetary Sciences committee. She is the Chair of the Outer Planets group of the International Astronomical Union's Working Group for Planetary System Nomenclature. Her past committee experience includes the National Academy of Sciences/National Research Council's Space Studies Board Committee to plan for NASA's New Frontiers missions (2007–2008), the JPL Director's Advisory Committee for Women, the Committee for Minorities and Women in Geosciences of the Geological Society of America, and the Subcommittee on Diversity at the American Geophysical Union.

Her awards include the Latinas in Science medal from the Comisión Feminil Mexicana Nacional in 1991, the 1997 Woman of the Year in Science and Technology Award from the Miami-based GEM television, the 2005 Carl Sagan Medal from the American Astronomical Society, the 2006 Women at Work Award, the 2007 NASA Exceptional Service Medal, and the 2014 Lowell Thomas award from The Explorers Club. She is a member of the International Astronomical Union, the American Geophysical Society, and a Fellow of the AAAS, the Royal Geographical Society, and the Explorers Club.

Lopes has authored over 100 research papers, articles, book chapters and encyclopaedia entries. She has been active in the media, featured on numerous documentaries for Discovery Channel, National Geographic Channel, History Channel, PBS, and on Nightline on American television, and has been interviewed by national and international media.

She has written seven books, including Volcanic Worlds: Exploring the Solar System Volcanoes (Praxis-Springer, 2004), Io After Galileo: A New View of Jupiter's Volcanic Moon (Praxis-Springer, 2007), and Alien Volcanoes (Johns Hopkins Press, 2008). The Volcano Adventure Guide (Cambridge University Press, 2005) describes every volcano on the planet and how to behave around them, information that is essential for anyone wishing to visit or photograph active volcanoes.

You've got to know what you're doing around active volcanoes... I've come across people who are totally unprepared.

— Rosaly Lopes

== Other work and interests ==
Lopes is a supporter of education, diversity, and outreach both nationally and internationally. She has given public lectures in several countries in Europe, Asia, and the Americas and was the co-organizer of the United Nations/European Space Agency/The Planetary Society workshops in 1992 and 1993. In 2005, she was awarded the Carl Sagan Medal by the Division for Planetary Sciences of the American Astronomical Society, in recognition of her efforts in public education, particularly among Hispanic groups and young women. This work includes talks, interviews, articles, a book on planetary volcanism, and efforts to nurture and mentor young scientists. Her hobbies include scuba diving, hiking, visiting volcanoes, and collecting volcano art.

== Selected bibliography ==
- Lopes-Gautier, Rosaly (2000). "Volcanism on Io". In Haraldur Sigurdsson; Bruce Houghton; Hazel Rymer; John Stix; Steve McNutt (eds.). Encyclopedia of Volcanoes. San Diego, CA: Academic Press. pp. 709–726. ISBN 978-0-12-643140-7.
- Lopes, Rosaly M.C.; Gregg, Tracy K.P. (2004). Volcanic Worlds: Exploring The Solar System's Volcanoes. Springer / Praxis. p. 236. ISBN 3-540-00431-9.
- Lopes, Rosaly M.C. (2005). The Volcano Adventure Guide. Cambridge University Press. pp. 362. ISBN 0-521-55453-5.
- Lopes, Rosaly M.C.; Spencer, John R. (2006). Io After Galileo: A New View of Jupiter's Volcanic Moon. Springer / Praxis. p. 342. ISBN 3-540-34681-3.
- Lopes, Rosaly M.C.; Carroll, Michael (2008). Alien Volcanoes. Johns Hopkins University Press. pp. 152. ISBN 978-0-8018-8673-7.
- Lopes, Rosaly (2011). Volcanoes: A Beginner's Guide. Oneworld Publications. p. 168. ISBN 978-1-8516-8725-1.
- Lopes, Rosaly M. C.; Fagents, Sarah A; Gregg, Tracy K. P. (2013). Modeling Volcanic Processes: The Physics and Mathematics of Volcanism. Cambridge University Press. p. 431. ISBN 978-0-5218-9543-9.
- Lopes, Rosaly; Carroll, Michael (2013). Alien Seas: Oceans in Space. Springer. p. 200. ISBN 978-1-4614-7472-2.

== Selected media ==
Selected documentaries and TV shows include:

- History Channel's "Prehistoric Megastorms" (2008);
- "Heads Up" Science Series, Knowledge TV, Canada, episode on New Horizons (January 2008);
- History Channel's "Search for E.T.", in "The Universe" series (August 2007);
- PBS "Wired Science" interview on volcanoes (October 2007);
- Discovery Channel's "Titan: Rendezvous with Saturn's Moon" (updated version, May 2007);
- National Geographic Television's "Naked Science: Deadliest Planets" (December 2006);
- History Channel's "Ask Mr. Know-It-All", pilot episode (as expert on volcanic dust), 2006;
- History Channel's "Inside the Volcano" (December 2006);
- Discovery Channel's "Rewind 2006" (science stories of 2006, December 2006);
- National Geographic Television's "Hollywood Science: Forces of Nature" (April 2006);
- Nightline's "Galileo" (September 2003);
- Discovery Channel's "Planet Storm" (2001);
- Discovery Channel's "95 Worlds and Counting" (2001)
