= Bonnie Buratti =

Planetary astronomer

Bonnie J. Buratti
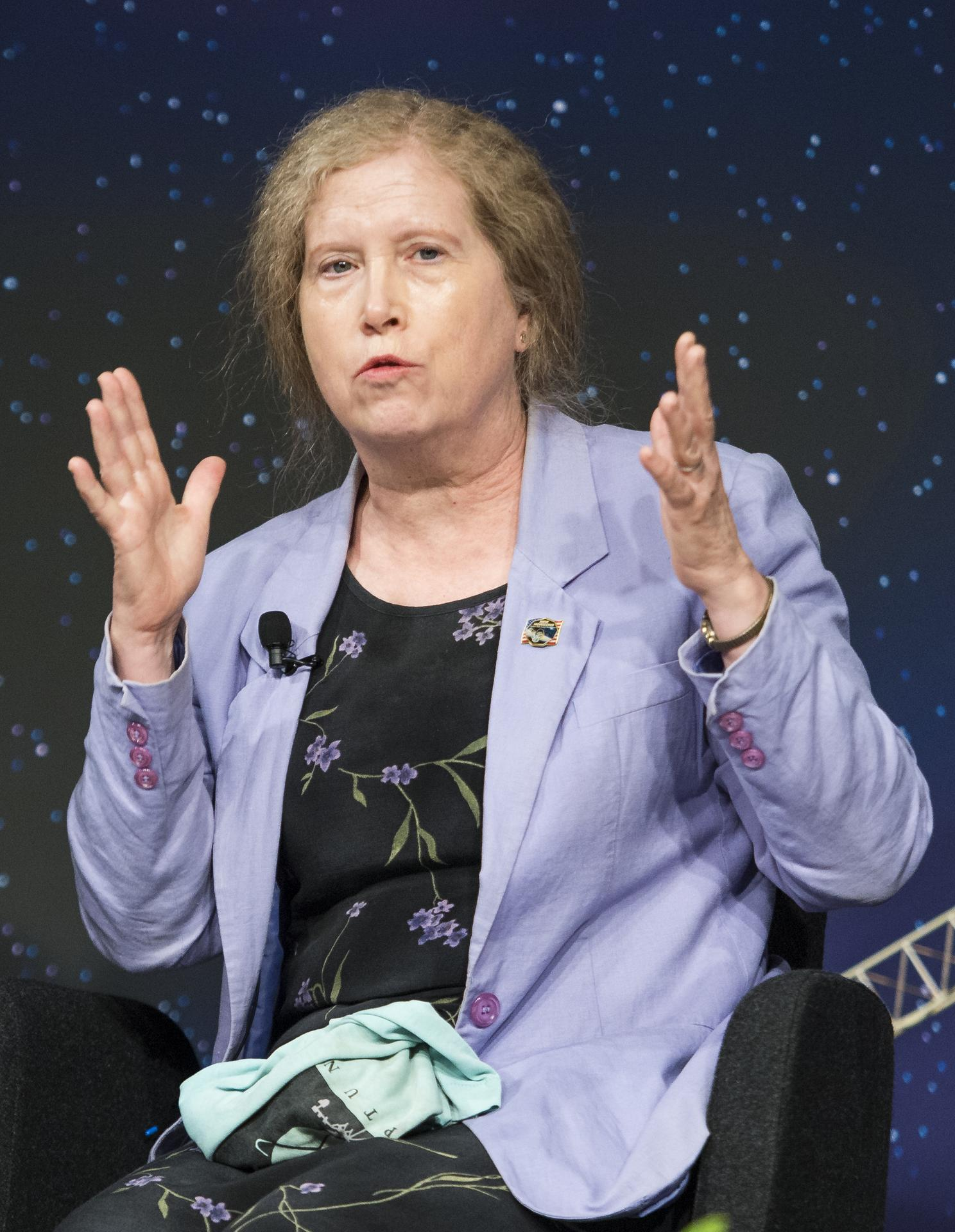
- Buratti in 2014
- Born: 1952 (age 73–74)
- Education: Massachusetts Institute of Technology; Cornell University
- Scientific career
- Fields: Planetary science
- Workplaces: Jet Propulsion Laboratory

Bonnie J. Buratti (born 1952) is an American planetary scientist in the Division of Earth and Space Sciences at the Jet Propulsion Laboratory in Pasadena, California, where she leads the Comets, Asteroids, and Satellites Group. Her research involves the composition and physical properties of planetary surfaces, and volatile transport in the outer solar system.

== Education ==
Buratti received an M.S. in Earth and Planetary sciences from the Massachusetts Institute of Technology and an M.S. and PhD in Astronomy and Space Sciences from Cornell University.

== Career ==
Buratti has worked on the Voyager Program, the Cassini–Huygens spacecraft (for which she served as Co-Investigator on the VIMS instrument), and the New Horizons space probe. For her work with the Cassini program she was awarded the NASA exceptional achievement medal in 2006. Buratti also does educational outreach at the college and grade school level. In 2014 she was elected Chair of the Division of Planetary Sciences of the American Astronomical Society. In November 2015, Buratti was named the NASA Project Scientist for the European Space Agency's Rosetta mission to Comet 67P/Churyumov–Gerasimenko. From 2019 to 2022, Buratti was the Chair of NASA's Small Bodies Assessment Group. Dr. Buratti is also noted for mentoring other scientists, specifically those who were of underrepresented groups. She has mentor programs for postdoc advisors and was a mentor for AGU College of Fellows.

== Awards and honors ==
- The Hildian asteroid 90502 Buratti, discovered by NEAT in 2004, was named in her honor on 21 March 2008 (M.P.C. 62356).
- She is a Fellow of the American Geophysical Union.
- In 2018, she was awarded the Carl Sagan Medal.
- In 2022, she was awarded the Gerard P. Kuiper Prize.
- She was named a Fellow of the American Astronomical Society in 2024, "for fundamental insights into the origin and nature of small-body surfaces using both space- and ground-based facilities, tireless devotion to the planetary science community, and wise and supportive mentorship of young scientists".

== Bibliography ==
=== Books ===
- Worlds Fantastic, Worlds Familiar: A Guided Tour of the Solar System ISBN 9781316591444

=== Lecture ===
- Kuiper Prize Lecture: From Pinpoints of Light to Geologic Worlds: The Magic of Photometry
