= 2685 Masursky =

Small Eunomian Asteroid

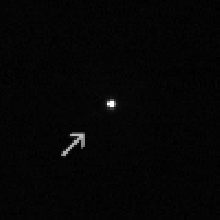
- Masursky imaged by Cassini–Huygens in January 2000

Discovery
- Discovered by: E. Bowell
- Discovery site: Anderson Mesa Stn.
- Discovery date: 3 May 1981

Designations
- Pronunciation: /məˈzɜːrski/
- Named after: Harold Masursky (American planetary geologist)
- Alternative designations: 1981 JN · 1950 VO; 1973 QF · 1975 XJ_{5} 1977 KU
- Minor planet category: main-belt · (middle); Eunomia

Orbital characteristics
- Epoch 23 March 2018 (JD 2458200.5)
- Uncertainty parameter 0
- Observation arc: 44.58 yr (16,282 d)
- Aphelion: 2.8522 AU
- Perihelion: 2.2874 AU
- Semi-major axis: 2.5698 AU
- Eccentricity: 0.1099
- Orbital period (sidereal): 4.12 yr (1,505 d)
- Mean anomaly: 54.965°
- Mean motion: 0° 14^{m} 21.48^{s} / day
- Inclination: 12.129°
- Longitude of ascending node: 215.36°
- Argument of perihelion: 288.47°

Physical characteristics
- Mean diameter: 10.744±0.170 km
- Geometric albedo: 0.114±0.034
- Spectral type: S
- Absolute magnitude (H): 12.1

2685 Masursky, provisional designation 1981 JN, is a stony Eunomian asteroid from the central regions of the asteroid belt, approximately 11 kilometers (6.8 miles) in diameter. It was discovered on 3 May 1981, by American astronomer Edward Bowell at the Anderson Mesa Station near Flagstaff, Arizona, and named after American planetary geologist Harold Masursky. In January 2000, the Cassini space probe observed the S-type asteroid from afar during its coast to Saturn.

== Orbit and classification ==
Masursky is a member of the Eunomia family (502), a prominent family of stony asteroids and the largest one in the intermediate main belt with more than 5,000 members.

It orbits the Sun in the central main-belt at a distance of 2.3–2.9 AU once every 4 years and 1 month (1,505 days; semi-major axis of 2.57 AU). Its orbit has an eccentricity of 0.11 and an inclination of 12° with respect to the ecliptic. The asteroid was first observed as 1950 VO at McDonald Observatory in November 1950. The body's observation arc begins with its observation as 1973 QF at Cerro El Roble Observatory in August 1973, nearly 8 years prior to its official discovery observation at Anderson Mesa.

== Cassini–Huygens flyby ==
Little was known about Masursky until the Cassini–Huygens space probe, en route to Jupiter and Saturn, flew past it on 23 January 2000. Because Cassini passed the asteroid at a distance of 1.6 million kilometers (approximately 4 lunar distances), the images it returned showed nothing more than a dot.

== Physical characteristics ==
Cassini's observations had cast some doubt on its composition, but later ground-based spectroscopy has confirmed its stony S-type spectrum, which is also the Eunomia family's overall spectral type.

=== Diameter and albedo ===
During its flyby in January 2000, Cassini–Huygens estimated a mean diameter of approximately 15–20 kilometers, based on an angular diameter of 0.81–1.08 arcseconds just hours before its closest approach. According to the survey carried out by the NEOWISE mission of NASA's Wide-field Infrared Survey Explorer, Masursky measures 10.744 kilometers in diameter and its surface has an albedo of 0.114.

=== Rotation period ===
As of 2018, no rotational lightcurve of Masursky has been obtained from photometric observations. The body's rotation period, spin-axis and shape remain unknown.

== Naming ==
This minor planet was named after Harold Masursky (1922–1990), a planetary geologist at the USGS Astrogeology Science Center of the U.S. Geological Survey, in Flagstaff, Arizona. Masursky worked on numerous space missions and programs including Ranger, Surveyor, Lunar Orbiter, Apollo, Mariner 9, Viking, Pioneer Venus, Voyager, as well as on the Galileo and Magellan spacecraft. The official naming citation was published by the Minor Planet Center on 4 August 1982 (M.P.C. 7158).
