= William E. Brunk =

American astronomer (born 1928)

William E. Brunk (born November 24, 1928) is an American retired astronomer and NASA administrator.

== Life and career ==
William E. Brunk was born in Cleveland, Ohio on November 24, 1928. He was educated at high school in Cleveland, Ohio and attended the local Case Institute of Technology in 1948, gaining a B.S. in 1952 and an M.S. in Astronomy in 1954.

Brunk worked as a research scientist and aeronaut in the Lewis Flight Propulsion Laboratory from 1954 until 1958, before moving to the NASA Lewis Research Center as an aerospace research engineer, working there from 1958 to 1964.

Brunk returned to the Case Institute in 1963 to earn his Ph.D. in astronomy, before accepting the position of staff scientist for the Voyager mission (1964-1965). He was then acting Chief (1965) and later Program Chief of Planetary Astronomy at NASA headquarters (1965-1982), where he played an important role in the construction of the 2.6-m reflector at the McDonald Observatory and the Infrared Telescope Facility at Mauna Kea.

Brunk retired from NASA in 1985.

== Honors and awards ==
- 1995 Harold Masursky Award for Meritorious Service to Planetary Science
- Minor planet 2499 Brunk, discovered in 1978, was named in his honor.
