= Susan Niebur =

American planetary scientist

Susan Niebur (1973–2012) was an American planetary scientist, promoter of women in science, and mommyblogger.

== Life ==
Nieber graduated in 1995 from Georgia Tech with a bachelor's degree in physics. She earned a Ph.D. in 2001 at Washington University in St. Louis, joined NASA as an intern in 2001, and became a scientist in the NASA Discovery Program in 2003. She left NASA to become a consultant in 2006.

She was diagnosed with inflammatory breast cancer in 2007, and died of it on February 6, 2012.

== Contributions ==
While still a student, Niebur founded the Forum on Graduate Student Affairs of the American Physical Society and the National Doctoral Program Survey, and was president of the National Association of Graduate-Professional Students. At NASA, she founded the Early Career Fellowships and Workshops for Planetary Scientists. She began her "Women in Planetary Science" blog in 2008, and also wrote a widely-read mommyblog, "Toddler Planet".

== Recognition ==
Niebur was given the Masursky Award of the American Astronomical Society, for outstanding service to planetary science and exploration, posthumously in 2012.

Asteroid 113394 Niebur is named for Niebur. An annual meeting for women in planetary science, the Susan Niebur Women in Planetary Science Networking Event, is also named after her.
