= Gustav Björkman =

Swedish bandy player

Personal information
- Full name: Gustav Björkman
- Born: 24 February 1976 (age 50) Sweden
- Height: 6 ft 3 in (1.91 m)
- Playing position: Forward

Senior career*
Years	Team	Apps^{†}	(Gls)^{†}
1994–1998	Sandviken		
1998–2000	Skutskär		
2000–2002	Bollnäs		
2002–2006	Sandviken		
2006–2010	Hammarby		
- * Senior club appearances and goals counted for the domestic league only. † Appearances (Goals).

Gustav "Gurkan" Björkman (born 24 February 1976) is a retired Swedish bandy forward.

He won the Swedish championship three times, with Sandvikens AIK in 1997 and 2003, and with Hammarby IF Bandy in 2010.
