= Lunar and Planetary Science Conference =

- Status: Active
- Genre: Conference
- Date: March
- Frequency: Annually
- Country: USA
- Years active: 57
- Inaugurated: January 5, 1970
- Participants: c. 2000
- Major events: Planetary science
- Sponsors: Lunar and Planetary Institute, Johnson Space Center
- Website: https://www.hou.usra.edu/meetings/lpsc2027/
- From 1970 to 1977 named the Lunar Science Conference.

The Lunar and Planetary Science Conference (LPSC), jointly sponsored by the Lunar and Planetary Institute (LPI) and NASA Johnson Space Center (JSC), brings together international specialists in petrology, geochemistry, geophysics, geology, and astronomy to present the latest results of research in planetary science. Since its beginning in 1970, the LPSC has been a significant focal point for planetary science research, with more than 2000 planetary scientists and students attending from all over the world.

== History ==
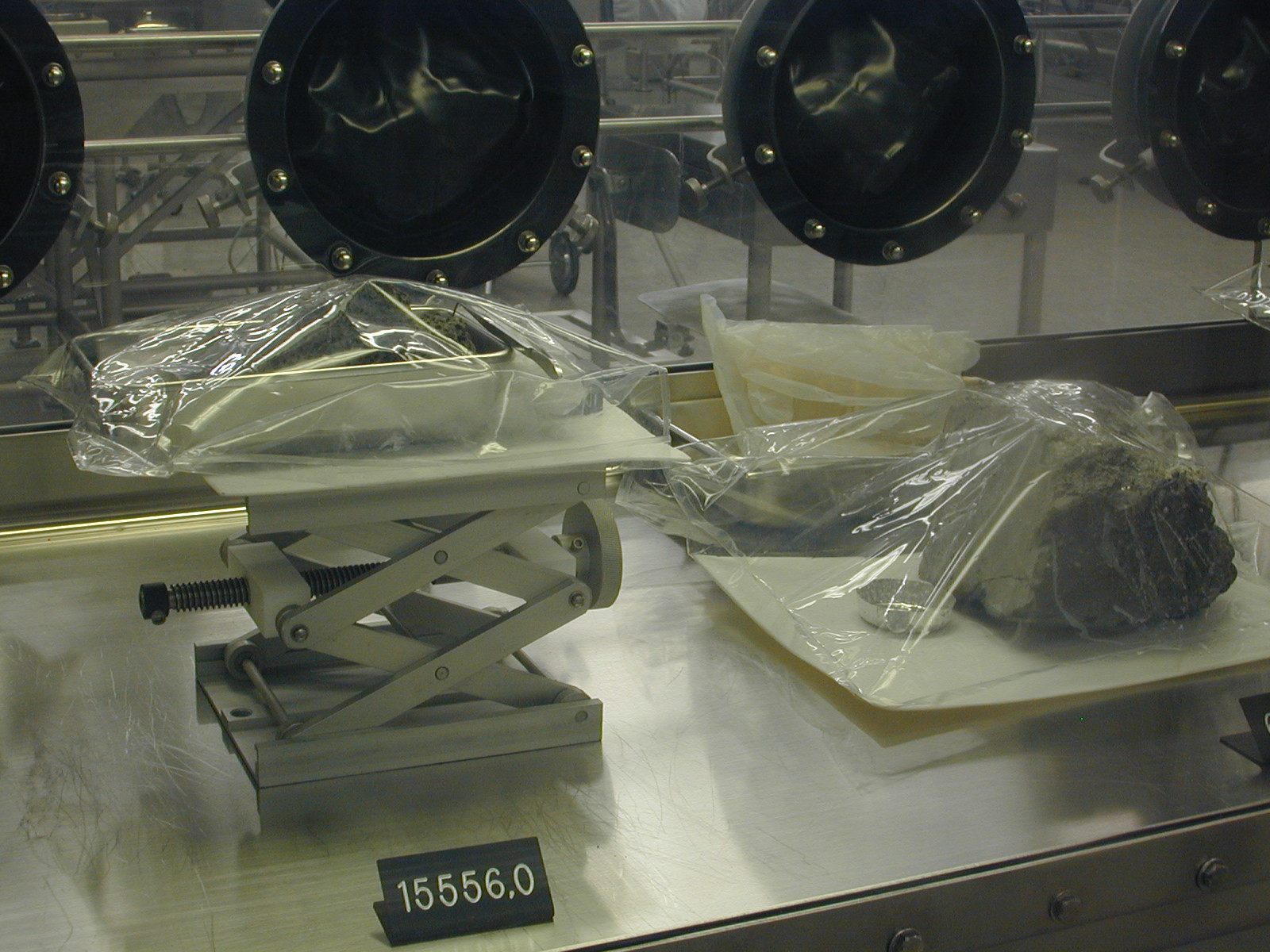
Lunar Samples at the Johnson Space Center

In a speech delivered at the Manned Spacecraft Center (MSC) in Houston, Texas, in March 1968, President Lyndon B. Johnson announced the formation of the Lunar Science Institute (LSI). The creation of the LSI was the culmination of meetings and events involving the National Aeronautics and Space Administration, the National Academy of Sciences, Universities Research Association, and several major universities. Initially operated by the National Academy of Sciences, the Universities Space Research Association took over the management of the Lunar Science Institute on December 11, 1969.

A program of visiting university-based scientists was established, the first symposium was organized, and the first lecture of the LSI seminar series was presented. The first science conference, known as the Apollo 11 Lunar Science Conference, was held in Houston from January 5–8, 1970. During the early days of the Apollo Program, meetings focused on the study of the lunar samples. In 1978, the name of the conference was changed from the Lunar Science Conference to the Lunar and Planetary Science Conference to reflect the expanded scope of research that included planetary science. After five decades, this conference continues to draw planetary scientists and researchers from around the world.

The conference has been held every year since 1970 except for 2020. The first three conferences were held in January, and from 1973 on, they have been held in March. In 2020, the conference was cancelled due to the COVID-19 pandemic. In 2021, the conference was held virtually for the same reason. Since 2022, the conference has been held as a hybrid meeting (both in-person and virtual). The most recent conference was held March 16–20, 2026, in The Woodlands, Texas, 31 miles north of Houston, Texas.

== LPSC today ==
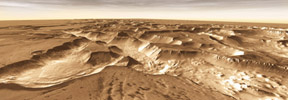
Noctis Vista, Mars 2001 Mars Odyssey

The schedule for the five-day conference consists of parallel sessions of contributed presentations that emphasize planetary processes and those related to planetary bodies. Contributed abstracts are peer-reviewed, and selections for presentation are based on the overall relevance of the subject matter to the conference and the quality of the science. The conference features five full days of oral and poster sessions covering a variety of topics in planetary science research. A number of special sessions and events are also scheduled. Every year special sessions are held covering a variety of topics, including recent events in planetary science and current planetary missions and their results. Special sessions are scheduled throughout the week of the conference and throughout the event venue.

Highlighted events of the conference include a welcome event, a briefing from the Planetary Sciences Division of NASA's Science Mission Directorate, plenary sessions, education/public outreach presentations, peripheral team meetings and workshops, and networking opportunities. Special events for students are also featured. Each year, a lecture series is held at the conference, in honor of Harold Masursky (1922-1990), an American astrogeologist. The series began in 1992.

Every ten years a Planetary Science Decadal Survey Briefing is held as part of the conference. This decadal survey "shall broadly canvas the field of space- and ground-based planetary science to determine the current state of knowledge and then identify the most important scientific questions expected to face the community...In addition, the survey and report shall address relevant programmatic and implementation issues of interest to NASA and the National Science Foundation (NSF)."
