= Karen Bjorkman =

American astronomer

Karen Beth Shipley Bjorkman is an American astronomer whose research applies polarimetry to the study of massive stars and circumstellar discs. She is Distinguished University Professor and Helen Luedtke Brooks Endowed Professor in Astronomy at the University of Toledo, and the university's provost and executive vice president for academic affairs.

== Education and career ==
Bjorkman earned her Ph.D. in 1989 at the University of Colorado Boulder. Her dissertation, Ultraviolet and infrared studies of Be stars, was supervised by Theodore Snow.

After postdoctoral research at the University of Wisconsin, she joined the University of Toledo faculty in 1996. She became dean of the university's College of Natural Sciences and Mathematics in 2010, and was named interim provost and executive vice president in 2019.

== Recognition ==
Bjorkman was elected as a Fellow of the American Association for the Advancement of Science in 2017.

In 2023 the American Astronomical Society (AAS) named Bjorkman as a Fellow of the AAS, "for important contributions to the study of Be stars and applications of astronomical polarimetry; strong leadership in education and in public outreach especially through Universe in the Park; a dedicated commitment to increasing diversity in astrophysics; and notable service to the astronomical community and her university". She was the first astronomer at the University of Toledo to be given this recognition.
