= Division for Planetary Sciences =

The Division for Planetary Sciences (DPS) is a division within the American Astronomical Society (AAS) devoted to Solar System research. It was founded in 1968. The first organizing committee members were: Edward Anders, Lewis Branscomb, Joseph W. Chamberlain, Richard M. Goody, John S. Hall, Arvidas Kliore, Michael B. McElroy, Tobias Owen, Gordon Pettengill, Carl Sagan, and Harlan James Smith. As of 2009, it is the largest special-interest division within the AAS. As of Oct 2010, membership totaled approximately 1415 planetary scientists and astronomers, including about 20% residing outside the U.S.

DPS sponsors six prizes. The Kuiper Prize honors outstanding contributions to the field of planetary science. The Urey Prize recognizes outstanding achievement in planetary research by a young scientist. The Masursky Award acknowledges outstanding service to planetary science and exploration. The Carl Sagan Medal recognizes and honors outstanding communication by an active planetary scientist to the general public. The Jonathan Eberhart Planetary Sciences Journalism Award is a prize that recognizes and stimulates distinguished popular writing on planetary sciences. The Claudia J. Alexander Prize recognizes outstanding achievement in planetary research by a mid-career scientist.

DPS has held meetings annually since 1970.

The official journal of the DPS is Icarus.

== See also ==
- List of astronomical societies
