= Jonathan Lunine =

American planetary scientist (born 1959)

Jonathan I. Lunine
- Born: Jonathan Irving Lunine; June 26, 1959 (age 67); New York City, New York, U.S.
- Education: University of Rochester (B.S.); California Institute of Technology (M.S., Ph.D.)
- Known for: Studies of Titan, planetary habitability, planet formation, and spacecraft mission science
- Awards: Harold C. Urey Prize (1988); Zeldovich Award (1990); AGU Union Fellow (1995); James B. Macelwane Medal (1995); International Academy of Astronautics Basic Science Award (2009); Jean Dominique Cassini Medal (2015); AGU Carl Sagan Lecture (2017)
- Scientific career
- Fields: Planetary science, physics, astrobiology
- Workplaces: Jet Propulsion Laboratory; California Institute of Technology; Cornell University; University of Arizona; University of Rome
- Doctoral advisor: David J. Stevenson

Jonathan Irving Lunine (born June 26, 1959) is an American planetary scientist and physicist. He is Chief Scientist at NASA's Jet Propulsion Laboratory and Professor of Planetary Science at the California Institute of Technology. Before joining JPL and Caltech in 2024, he was the David C. Duncan Professor in the Physical Sciences at Cornell University and chair of Cornell's Department of Astronomy.

Lunine's research concerns the formation and evolution of planetary systems, planetary interiors and atmospheres, planetary habitability, the origin of water and organic compounds, and the search for life-supporting environments in and beyond the Solar System. He is particularly associated with studies of Saturn's moon Titan, including its atmosphere, surface liquids, methane cycle, organic chemistry, and astrobiological potential. He has served in scientific roles on major planetary and astronomical missions, including Voyager 2, Cassini–Huygens, Juno, the James Webb Space Telescope, Europa Clipper, and the European Space Agency's Jupiter Icy Moons Explorer.

Lunine is a member of the National Academy of Sciences, a Fellow of the American Association for the Advancement of Science and the American Geophysical Union, and an Academician of the International Academy of Astronautics. A 2024 congressional biography listed him as the author of more than 400 refereed papers and chapters and three books.

== Early life and education ==
Lunine was born in New York City. In a NASA interview, he recalled that reading Carl Sagan's The Cosmic Connection as a teenager was an early influence on his interest in planetary science. He wrote to Sagan and received a detailed reply; Lunine later described the exchange as helping him imagine planetary science as a possible career. As an undergraduate in 1979, he was also influenced by a Voyager 1 approach image of Jupiter, which he later said drew him toward spacecraft-based planetary exploration.

He earned a B.S. in physics and astronomy from the University of Rochester in 1980, graduating magna cum laude with distinction, and then completed an M.S. in planetary science at Caltech in 1983 and a Ph.D. in planetary science at Caltech in 1985. His graduate adviser was David J. Stevenson, whom Lunine has credited with shaping his approach to scientific problems.

== Career ==
After completing his doctorate, Lunine joined the University of Arizona, where he was on the faculty from 1986 to 2011. His work there included theoretical and mission-related research on the outer Solar System, giant planets, planetary satellites, and planetary habitability. Caltech's faculty profile also records that he served on the faculty of the University of Rome in Italy.

In 2011 Lunine moved to Cornell University as the David C. Duncan Professor in the Physical Sciences. He later served as chair of Cornell's Department of Astronomy from 2019 to 2024. At Cornell, his research group continued work on Titan, giant planets, planetary formation, exoplanets, astrobiology, and spacecraft mission science.

In June 2024, Caltech and JPL announced that Lunine would become Chief Scientist of NASA's Jet Propulsion Laboratory, officially assuming the role on August 16, 2024. The position is responsible for guiding JPL's scientific research and development, helping set scientific priorities and policies, encouraging collaborations, and supporting the scientific integrity of missions managed by JPL for NASA. He was also appointed Professor of Planetary Science at Caltech.

== Research ==
=== Titan and the Saturn system ===
A major part of Lunine's work has focused on Titan, Saturn's largest moon. In 1983, while still a graduate student, he co-authored the Science paper "Ethane Ocean on Titan" with David J. Stevenson and Yuk L. Yung. The paper argued that photochemical reactions in Titan's atmosphere could produce large quantities of liquid ethane at the surface, helping establish surface liquids and organic chemistry as central questions for future Titan exploration.

Lunine continued to develop models of Titan's volatile chemistry and surface-atmosphere interactions. His work with Stevenson on clathrate and ammonia hydrates examined possible sources and storage mechanisms for methane on Titan. In 1993, he published a review asking whether Titan had an ocean, summarizing the pre-Cassini evidence for and against a global surface reservoir of hydrocarbons. Following the arrival of Cassini–Huygens at Saturn, Lunine contributed to mission-based interpretations of Titan's surface and climate, including work on Titan's methane cycle and its comparison with Earth's hydrological cycle.

Lunine's Titan research also connects planetary science with astrobiology. He has treated Titan as a test case for understanding whether chemically rich environments very different from Earth might support prebiotic chemistry or, more speculatively, forms of life based on different solvents and environmental conditions. This line of work broadened his research from the physical state of Titan's atmosphere and surface to questions about habitability and the range of environments in which life-supporting chemistry might occur.

=== Planet formation and habitability ===
Lunine has also worked on planetary formation, giant planets, and the conditions that allow habitable worlds to develop. With Stevenson, he co-authored a 1988 paper on the rapid formation of Jupiter by the redistribution of water vapor in the solar nebula, contributing to theoretical work on how giant planets could form within the lifetimes of protoplanetary disks.

He later examined how giant planets affect the habitability of planetary systems. In a 2001 article in the Proceedings of the National Academy of Sciences, he discussed the occurrence of Jovian planets and their relevance to the survival, volatile delivery, and long-term habitability of terrestrial planets. He also co-authored dynamical simulations of terrestrial planet formation and water delivery, including the 2004 Icarus paper "Making other earths".

His work has extended to exoplanets and comparative habitability. In "Titan and habitable planets around M-dwarfs", Lunine used Titan and planets around low-mass stars as examples for considering atmospheres, redox chemistry, volatile inventories, and non-Earth-like habitable environments. NASA and Cornell profiles describe his research as combining theoretical modeling with spacecraft and observatory data, including work on brown dwarfs, exoplanets, giant planets, and icy moons.

== Space missions and advisory work ==
Lunine's first spacecraft mission involvement was with the Voyager 2 encounter with Neptune in 1989, where he helped with the ultraviolet spectrometer solar occultation observation of Triton. JPL later described him as a guest investigator on the Voyager 2 Neptune ultraviolet spectrometer.

His longest mission association has been with Cassini–Huygens, the joint NASA, ESA, and ASI mission to Saturn. He served as an interdisciplinary scientist on Cassini-Huygens from 1990 to 2018. NASA's Cassini team page lists him as the interdisciplinary scientist for the Huygens investigation of Titan's atmosphere and surface, as well as a member of the Cassini radar team. His research on Titan's atmosphere, surface liquids, and methane cycle was closely aligned with Cassini's exploration of Titan.

Lunine is also a co-investigator on Juno, NASA's mission to Jupiter. His work on Jupiter connects mission measurements of the planet's interior and composition with broader questions about giant-planet formation. For the James Webb Space Telescope, NASA lists him as an interdisciplinary scientist with interests in extrasolar planets and Kuiper Belt objects, and Cornell described his Webb observing work as focused on exoplanets and small bodies in the outer Solar System.

For Europa Clipper, NASA lists Lunine as a co-investigator on the Mapping Imaging Spectrometer for Europa (MISE). JPL and Caltech also describe him as a member of the mission's gravity science team. He is also involved in the 3GM gravity and radio science experiment on ESA's Jupiter Icy Moons Explorer mission. Among proposed mission concepts, he was a leading scientific advocate for Enceladus Life Finder, a mission concept intended to search for evidence of life-related chemistry in the plume material of Saturn's moon Enceladus.

Lunine has served on a number of advisory and planning committees for NASA and the National Academies. JPL and Caltech note that he chaired or co-chaired committees related to planetary science and human exploration, including the Giant Planet Systems panel for the 2023 Planetary Science and Astrobiology Decadal Survey and the National Research Council committee that produced Pathways to Exploration: Rationales and Approaches for a U.S. Program of Human Space Exploration.

== Teaching, public engagement, and science and religion ==
Lunine has combined research with teaching and mentoring. In a NASA interview, he described teaching, advising graduate students, and guiding undergraduates as continuing parts of his academic work. Caltech lists him as a co-instructor of a course on planetary mission formulation and design, covering science requirements, engineering trades, instrument design, proposal writing, and mission management.

Lunine has also spoken publicly about astrobiology, planetary exploration, and the relationship between science and religion. He was raised in the Jewish faith and became a Catholic, saying in a 2016 interview that he was baptized and confirmed in the Catholic Church in 2007. He helped found the Society of Catholic Scientists and served as its vice president.

== Awards and honors ==
Lunine's honors include:

- 1988 — Harold C. Urey Prize of the American Astronomical Society Division for Planetary Sciences.
- 1990 — Zeldovich Award.
- 1995 — James B. Macelwane Medal of the American Geophysical Union.
- 2003 — Fellow of the American Association for the Advancement of Science.
- 2009 — Basic Science Award of the International Academy of Astronautics.
- 2010 — Elected member of the National Academy of Sciences.
- 2015 — Jean Dominique Cassini Medal and Honorary Membership of the European Geosciences Union, awarded for contributions to planetary sciences, exobiology, mission leadership, and space-science policy.

== Selected publications ==
=== Books ===
- Lunine, Jonathan I. (2013). Earth: Evolution of a Habitable World (2nd ed.). Cambridge University Press. ISBN 978-0-521-61519-8.
- Lunine, Jonathan I. (2005). Astrobiology: A Multidisciplinary Approach. Pearson Addison-Wesley. ISBN 978-0-8053-8042-2.
- Levy, Eugene H.; Lunine, Jonathan I., eds. (1993). Protostars and Planets III. University of Arizona Press. ISBN 978-0-8165-1334-5.
- Impey, Chris; Lunine, Jonathan I.; Funes, José, eds. (2012). Frontiers of Astrobiology. Cambridge University Press. ISBN 978-1-107-00641-6.

=== Selected articles ===
- Lunine, Jonathan I.; Stevenson, David J.; Yung, Yuk L. (December 16, 1983). "Ethane Ocean on Titan". Science. 222 (4629): 1229–1230. doi:10.1126/science.222.4629.1229. PMID 17806723.
- Lunine, Jonathan I.; Stevenson, David J. (1987). "Clathrate and ammonia hydrates at high pressure: Application to the origin of methane on Titan". Icarus. 70 (1): 61–77.
- Stevenson, David J.; Lunine, Jonathan I. (1988). "Rapid formation of Jupiter by diffusive redistribution of water vapor in the solar nebula". Icarus. 75 (1): 146–155.
- Lunine, Jonathan I. (May 1993). "Does Titan have an ocean? A review of current understanding of Titan's surface". Reviews of Geophysics. 31 (2): 133–149. doi:10.1029/92RG02794.
- Lunine, Jonathan I. (2001). "The occurrence of Jovian planets and the habitability of planetary systems". Proceedings of the National Academy of Sciences of the United States of America. 98 (3): 809–814. doi:10.1073/pnas.98.3.809. PMC 14664.
- Raymond, Sean N.; Quinn, Thomas; Lunine, Jonathan I. (2004). "Making other earths: Dynamical simulations of terrestrial planet formation and water delivery". Icarus. 168 (1): 1–17. arXiv:astro-ph/0308159. doi:10.1016/j.icarus.2003.11.019.
- Lunine, Jonathan I.; Atreya, Sushil K. (2008). "The methane cycle on Titan". Nature Geoscience. 1: 159–164. doi:10.1038/ngeo125.
- Lunine, Jonathan I. (2009). "Saturn's Titan: A strict test for life's cosmic ubiquity". arXiv:0908.0762 [astro-ph.EP].
- Lunine, Jonathan I. (2010). "Titan and habitable planets around M-dwarfs". Faraday Discussions. 147: 405–418. doi:10.1039/C004788K.

== See also ==
- Astrobiology
- Planetary habitability
- Theoretical planetology
