= Asphaug =

Asphaug is a Norwegian surname. It means "Aspen Hill" and in Norwegian is pronounced "Ausp-Howg." It may refer to:

- Dr. Erik Ian Asphaug (born 1961), American planetary science professor
  - 7939 Asphaug, asteroid named for Erik Asphaug
- Martin Asphaug (born 1950), Norwegian film director
