= Kelsi Singer =

American planetary scientist

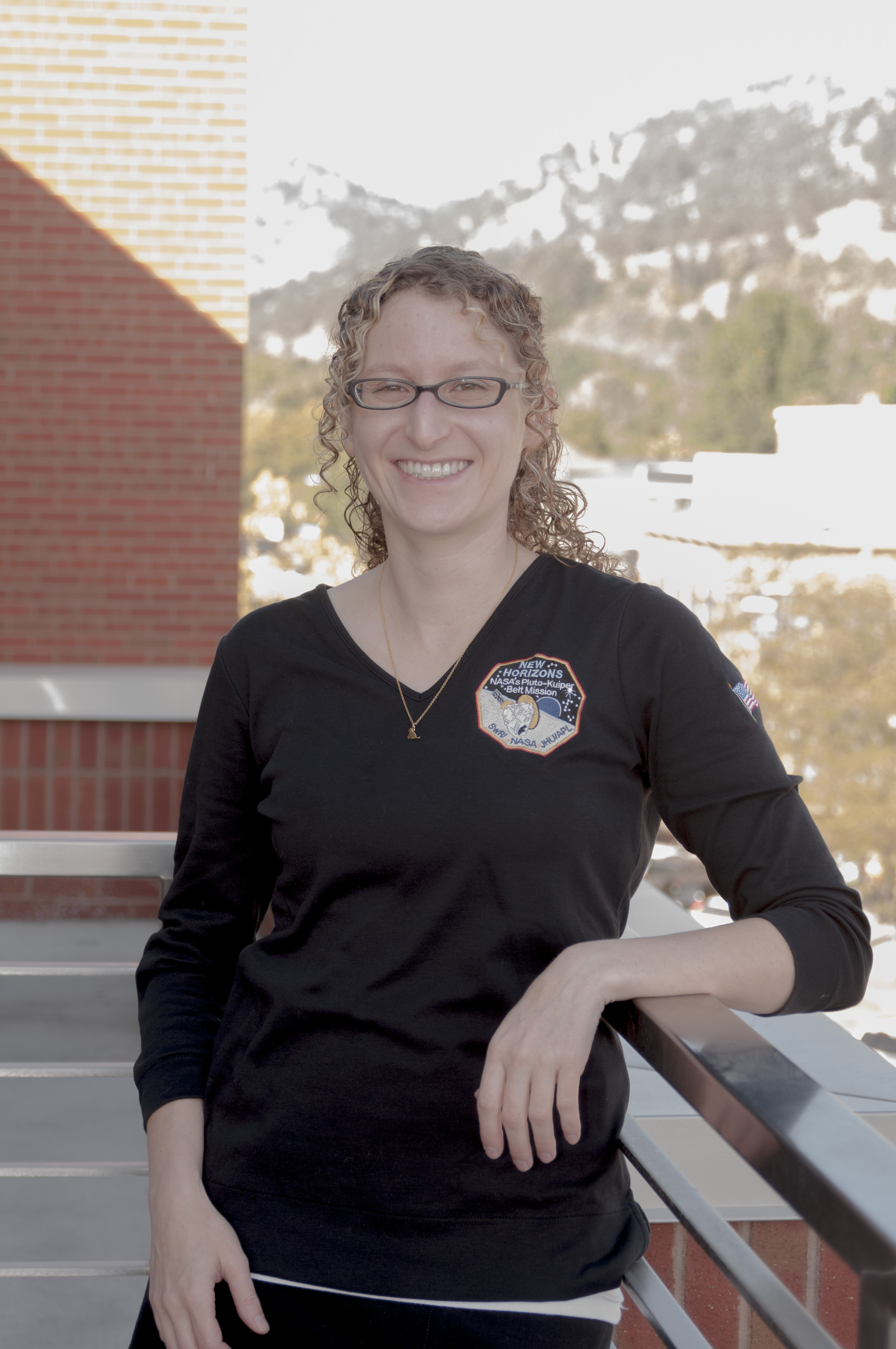
- Singer in 2016
- Born: 1984 (age 41–42)
- Education: University of Colorado at Boulder (BA); Washington University in St. Louis (PhD)
- Known for: Impact cratering, icy geophysics
- Awards: Harold C. Urey Prize
- Scientific career
- Fields: planetary science, geophysics, geomorphology, solar system astronomy
- Workplaces: Southwest Research Institute
- Thesis: Icy Satellite Tectonic, Geodynamic and Mass Wasting Surface Features: Constraints on Interior Processes and Evolution (2013)
- Doctoral advisor: William McKinnon
- Other academic advisors: Paul Schenk Brad Jolliff Slava Solomatov Briann Hynek Steve Mojzsis Fran Bagenal Alan Stern
- Website: https://sites.google.com/site/kelsisinger/

Kelsi N. Singer (born 1984) is an American planetary scientist who is a principal research scientist at the Southwest Research Institute (SwRI) in Boulder, Colorado. She is Deputy Principal Investigator of NASA's New Horizons mission studying the geomorphology and geophysics of the Pluto system and of Arrokoth.

== Education ==
Singer received a Bachelor's degree in Astronomy and Anthropology from the University of Colorado Boulder. While there, she decided to pursue research in the fields of astrobiology and planetary science. She studied abroad at Macquarie University in Sydney, Australia, during her undergrad, where she worked at the Australian Centre for Astrobiology studying clouds in Venus' atmosphere (with Dr. Jeremy Bailey), tidal sediments on Earth (with Dr. Malcom Walter), and also continued with her interest in archaeoastronomy. Upon returning to Boulder, she worked with Steve Mojzsis on her honors thesis project about using sediments called cyclic rhythmites to trace the length of a day over millions of years, and a research project on "blueberries" (hematite spherules) and thermal inertia on Mars.

Singer received a PhD in Earth and Planetary Science from Washington University in St. Louis in 2013 working with Dr. Bill McKinnon and Dr. Slava Solomatov; her dissertation was titled Icy Satellite Tectonic, Geodynamic, and Mass Wasting Surface Features: Constraints on Interior Processes and Evolution.

== Research ==
Singer continued as a postdoctoral researcher at Washington University with the Dr. Brad Jolliff and the Lunar Reconnaissance Orbiter Camera team after receiving her Ph.D. In 2014, she joined the New Horizons team at SwRI as a postdoctoral researcher, where she studied the geophysics of Kuiper Belt Objects, particularly cratering physics. At SwRI, she is currently a principal research scientist and Deputy Principal Investigator for the New Horizons Extended Mission.

In 2019, Singer and her team demonstrated from images of craters taken by New Horizons' Long Range Reconnaissance Imager (LoRRI) that small Kuiper Belt Objects (less than one mile in diameter) are rare. The results place constraints on formation and evolution models of the Solar System, suggesting that objects in the Kuiper Belt formed from rapidly collapsing dust clouds rather than incremental collisions of larger debris.

Singer has coordinated and contributed to the 'Women in Planetary Science' blog site since 2009.

Dr. Singer has worked on many planetary bodies throughout the solar system, but primarily: Mercury, the Earth's Moon, Mars, the icy moons of Jupiter, Saturn, and Neptune, Pluto, and other small bodies such as Kuiper belt objects and asteroids.

Her areas of expertise include:

- Geology and geophysics of icy worlds (icy satellites, Pluto, Charon, Europa),
- New Horizons mission operations,
- Impact cratering physics (scaling laws),
- Secondary craters across the solar system,
- Lunar cratering,
- Crater size-frequency distributions,
- Chaotic terrains,
- Landslides,
- Geographic Information Systems,
- Spacecraft mission proposals,
- Spacecraft extended mission proposals,
- Multi-flyby mission design (scientific input),
- Spacecraft flyby conops,
- and Astrobiology.

== Awards and honors ==
Singer received the American Astronomical Society (AAS) Division of Planetary Science (DPS) Harold C. Urey Prize in 2019, which recognizes outstanding achievements in planetary science by early career researchers. Asteroid 10698 Singer was named in her honor. The naming was published by the Minor Planet Center on 13 April 2017 (M.P.C.103977). Singer also received the Geological Society of America (GSA) Stephen E Dwornik Award for Best Graduate Poster Presentation in 2010, and the GSA Greeley award for Distinguished Service to Planetary Science.
