= Harold C. Urey Prize =

Science prize

The Harold C. Urey Prize is awarded annually by the Division for Planetary Sciences of the American Astronomical Society. The prize recognizes and encourages outstanding achievements in planetary science by a young scientist. The prize is named after Harold C. Urey.

== Urey Prize winners ==
- 1984 David J. Stevenson
- 1985 Larry W. Esposito
- 1986 Jack Wisdom
- 1987 Steve Squyres
- 1988 Jonathan I. Lunine
- 1989 Christopher P. McKay
- 1990 David J. Tholen
- 1991 Richard P. Binzel
- 1992 Jack J. Lissauer
- 1993 Roger Yelle
- 1994 Karen Jean Meech
- 1995 Emmanuel Lellouch
- 1996 Heidi B. Hammel
- 1997 Renu Malhotra
- 1998 Erik I. Asphaug
- 1999 Douglas P. Hamilton
- 2000 Alessandro Morbidelli
- 2001 Michael E. Brown
- 2002 Brett J. Gladman
- 2003 Robin M. Canup
- 2004 Jean-Luc Margot
- 2005 David Nesvorný
- 2006 Tristan Guillot
- 2007 Francis Nimmo
- 2008 no award
- 2009 Sarah Stewart-Mukhopadhyay
- 2010 Jonathan Fortney
- 2011 Eric B. Ford
- 2012 Alberto G. Fairen
- 2013 Anders Johansen
- 2014 Matija Ćuk
- 2015 Geronimo Villanueva
- 2016 Leigh Fletcher
- 2017 Bethany Ehlmann
- 2018 Francesca DeMeo
- 2019 Kelsi Singer
- 2020 Rebekah Dawson
- 2021 Lynnae Quick
- 2022 Juan Lora
- 2023 Quanzhi Ye
- 2024 Katherine de Kleer
- 2025 James Keane and Xinting Yu
- 2026 Ali Bramson and Tad Komacek

== See also ==
- List of astronomy awards
