= Larry W. Esposito =

American astronomer

Larry W. Esposito (born April 15, 1951) is an American planetary astronomer and a professor at the Laboratory for Atmospheric and Space Physics, University of Colorado Boulder. A 1973 graduate at the Massachusetts Institute of Technology, Esposito received his Ph.D. in astronomy at the University of Massachusetts Amherst. In 1985, he was awarded the H. C. Urey Prize by the American Astronomical Society. He was also awarded The NASA Medal for Exceptional Scientific Achievement, and the Richtmeyer Lecture Award from the American Association of Physics Teachers and the American Physical Society. His current work involves planetary atmospheres and ring systems.

Esposito was the principal investigator for the Ultra-Violet Imaging Spectrograph aboard the NASA Cassini-Huygens uncrewed mission to the Saturn system, and the co-investigator of the Photopolarimeter Investigation on the Voyager program spacecraft.
