= Francesca E. DeMeo =

American planetary scientist

Francesca DeMeo
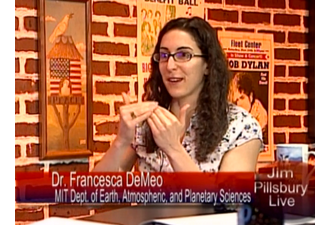
- Education: Massachusetts Institute of Technology Ph.D. in Astronomy and Astrophysics
- Occupations: Planetary science, astronomy
- Known for: Modern system of classification of asteroids, the Bus-DeMeo taxonomy
- Awards: 2006 Christopher Goetze Prize 2007, 2008 Fulbright Scholar 2018 Harold Clayton Urey Award

Francesca DeMeo, or Francesca E. DeMeo is an American doctoral astrophysicist, researcher and speaker specializing in the study of celestial bodies in the Solar System, including more particularly asteroids, comets and moons. She is the creator of the modern system of taxonomic classification of asteroids with Schelte J. Bus. With Benoît Carry, she brought a new vision of the main asteroid belt. She pursued entrepreneurial activities alongside astronomy.

== Education and career ==
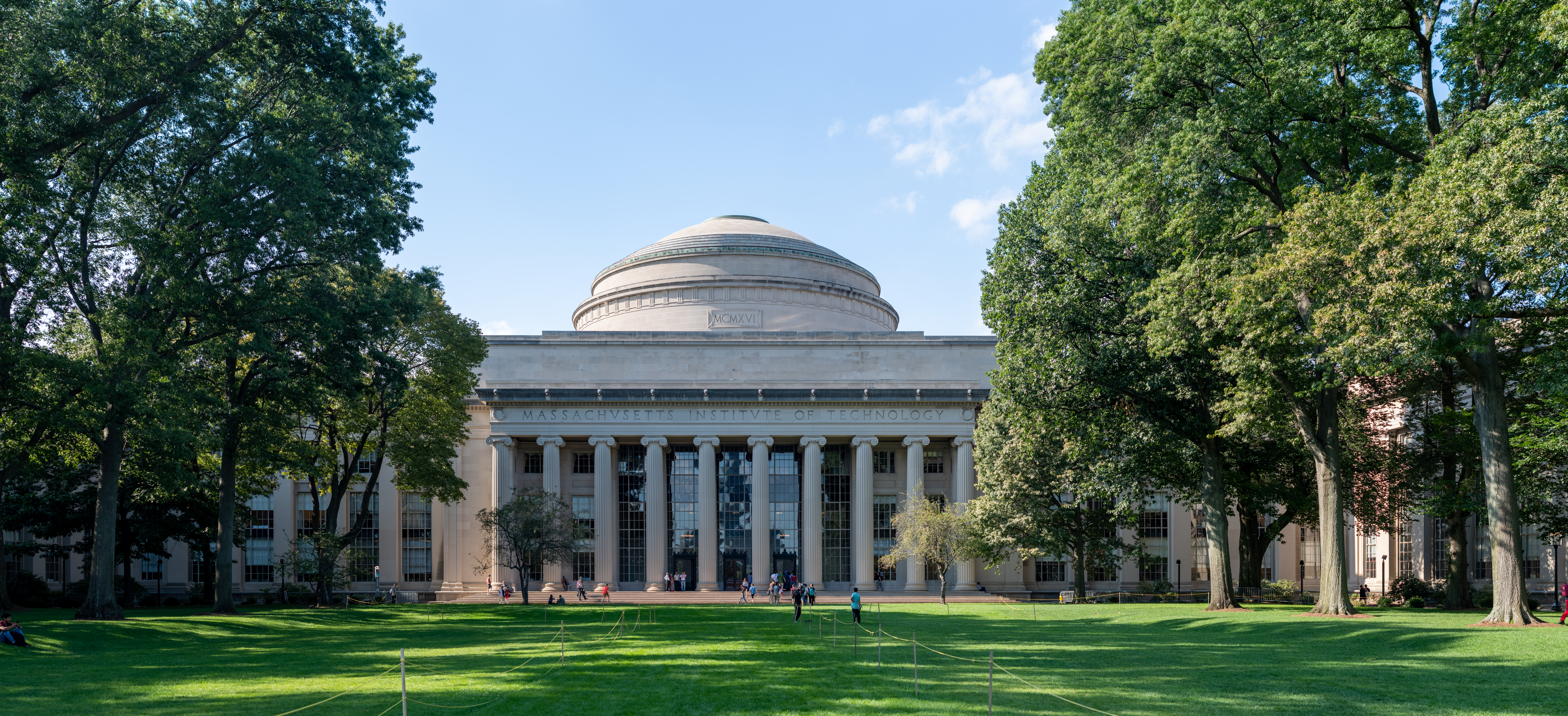
Great Dome, Massachusetts Institute of Technology

At the age of 18, Francesca DeMeo pursued in-depth studies of physics and planetary sciences at the Massachusetts Institute of Technology in Cambridge until 2006. She obtained two undergraduate degrees: B.S. in Physics and B.S. in Earth, Atmospheric, and Planetary Sciences.

In 2007, she received a M.S. in Planetary Science including small celestial bodies, asteroids, comets, moons, etc.

She was awarded a Fulbright Scholarship in 2007 and 2008 to study of planetary sciences within astronomy and astrophysics as a Fulbright Advanced Student, to pursue a PhD at the Paris Observatory in Meudon on the study of small bodies in the Solar System. In 2009, she received an Eiffel excellence scholarship to support her final year of doctoral studies.

In 2009 she published the Bus-DeMeo asteroid taxonomic classification system. This system has become the reference in the spectral classification of asteroids. She obtained her Ph.D. in Astronomy and Astrophysics in 2010. The dissertation on small solar bodies was titled: The Compositional Variation of Small Bodies across the Solar System. Her thesis co-supervisors are Maria Antonella Barucci and Richard P. Binzel.

The taxonomy paper from 2009 is one of the most cited papers in all of asteroid science, 672 times as of June 23, 2024.

She obtained her Ph.D. in Astronomy and Astrophysics in 2010. The dissertation on small solar bodies was titled: "The Compositional Variation of Small Bodies across the Solar System". Her thesis co-supervisors are Maria Antonella Barucci and Richard P. Binzel, with whom she continued collaborating.

=== Awards ===
- 2006 Christopher Goetze Prize
- 2012 Asteroid named DeMeo (8070).
- 2013 Hubble Fellowship.
- 2018 Harold Clayton Urey Award issued by Division of Planetary Sciences of the American Astronomical Society
- 2018 The Division of Planetology of the American Astronautical Society awards her the Harold C. Urey Prize "in recognition of the broad foundational understanding of the study of solar system bodies using the modern system of asteroid classification that bears her name."

=== Publication of research ===
DeMeo's papers on planetology in Nature and Icarus about Pluto, Triton, Charon, (52872) Okyhroe, (90482) Orcus, (379) Huenna and Small Solar System body.

=== Other activities ===
In 2011, Francesca DeMeo served as co-founder, CIO of Cambridge Select Inc. The same year, she served as a volunteer member of the board of directors of the Governor's Academy and remained there until 2021.
