= Geronimo Villanueva =

Argentine astronomer

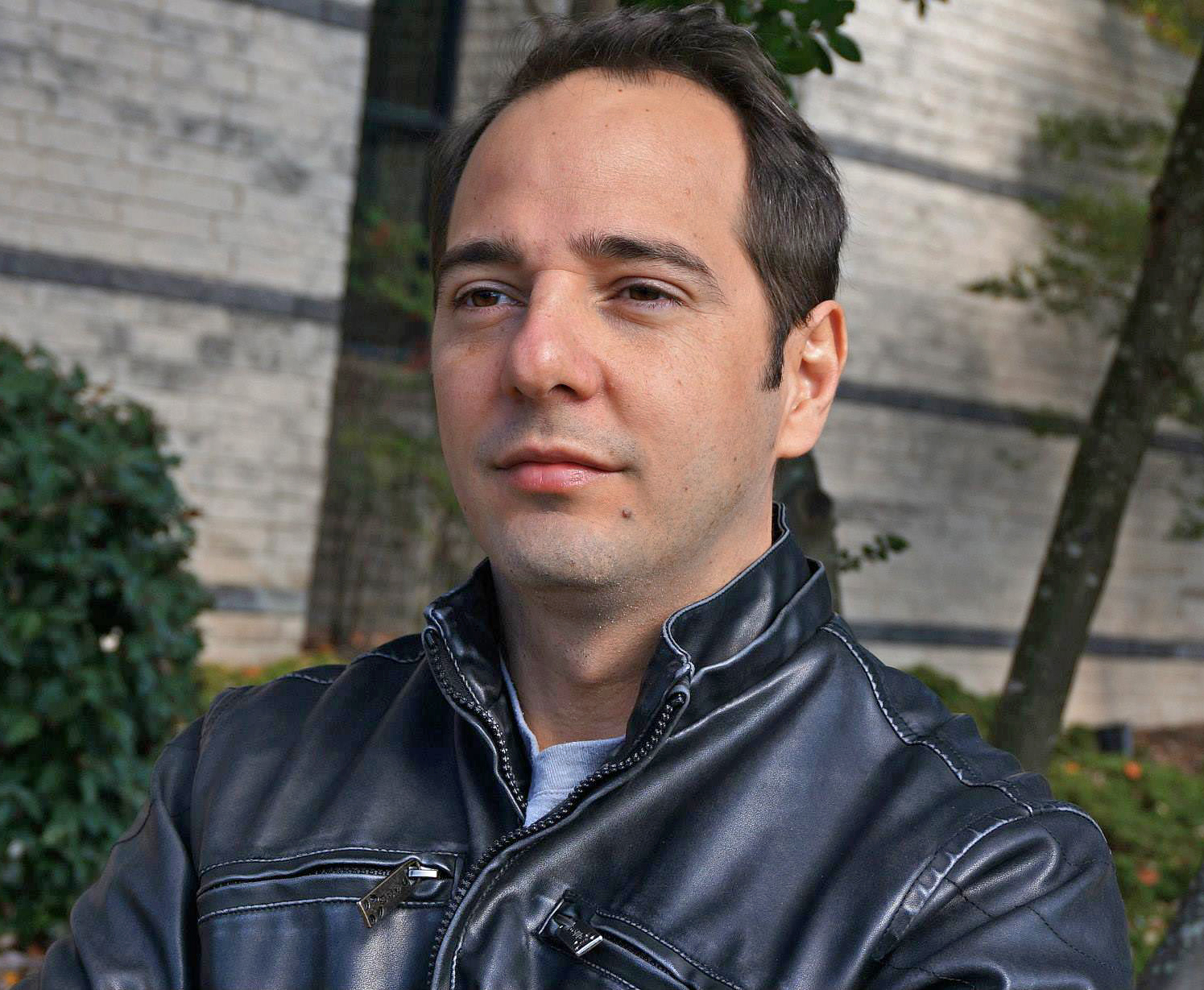
- Born: April 9, 1978 (age 47); Mendoza, Argentina
- Education: Freiburg University, Max Planck Institute for Solar System Research
- Known for: Mars ocean hypothesis, organics on the Atmosphere of Mars and molecular spectroscopy modelling.
- Scientific career
- Fields: Planetary astronomy
- Website: astrobiology.gsfc.nasa.gov/Villanueva/

Geronimo L. Villanueva (born April 9, 1978) is a planetary astronomer at NASA Goddard Space Flight Center. Some of his contributions include the identification of an ancient ocean on Mars, sensitive searches of primordial water in comets, and the search and possible discovery of organics on Mars. His work on high-resolution molecular spectroscopy of planetary and cometary atmospheres led the International Astronomical Union to name minor planet 9724 after Villanueva, while the American Astronomical Society awarded him the Urey Prize (young planetary scientist of the year) in 2015.

== Early life ==
Villanueva is a Mendoza, Argentina native. He earned his undergraduate degree and master's degree at Universidad de Mendoza. He conducted his Ph.D. research in Germany at the Max Planck Institute for Solar System Research from 2001 to 2004, graduating in November 2004 at the Freiburg University. He was awarded a National Research Council fellowship in 2005 to conduct planetary research at NASA Goddard Space Flight Center.

== Career ==
Villanueva is a planetary scientist who specializes in spectroscopic studies of planets, comets and small icy bodies. He obtained the first mapping of water D/H on Mars, revealing an ancient ocean on Mars and unexpected strong isotopic anomalies across the planet. Villanueva also obtained the first astronomical measurement of water D/H of a periodic comet, conducted a deep search for organics in the Martian atmosphere and discovered multiple isotopic carbon dioxide bands on Mars at infrared wavelengths. He develops non-LTE radiative transfer models and quantum molecular models at GSFC resulting in billions of spectral lines suitable for cometary, planetary and astrophysical sciences, including the study of exoplanets. During his Ph.D thesis, he was the lead designer and developer of the high resolution spectrometer onboard SOFIA, and developed a full non-linear dynamical General Circulation Model (GCM) for Mars.

== Honors, awards and accolades ==
In 2015 the American Astronomical Society awarded Villanueva with the Harold C. Urey Prize (young planetary scientist of the year), while in 2014 the International Astronomical Union named minor planet 1981EW17 “(9724) Villanueva”. Some recent highlights include: article of the day (Astrophysics Data System, Oct/12/2011), lead author and co-author of three Astronomy Picture of the Day (Dec/22/2014, Jan/19/2009, Feb/21/2009), and lead author of one of the most popular planetary articles of 2013.

== Social activism ==
He is an advocate for Space Exploration and Astronomy to under-privileged communities, and has served as a science communicator for the U.S. State Department and Shakira's Barefoot Foundation to promote science in developing regions.
