= Josip Andreis =

Croatian musicologist and music historian (1909–1982)

Josip Andreis (March 19, 1909 – January 16, 1982) was a Croatian musicologist. Born in Split, Croatia, he studied romance languages at the University of Zagreb and the University of Rome; graduating from the latter institution in 1931. He then pursued further studies in music at the Academy of Music, University of Zagreb where he was later appointed a professor of music history in 1945. He was the director of the musicology program at that institution until his retirement in 1972. He was the author of several books and served as editor of Muzičke novine (1950-1951) and Muzička enciklopedija (1958-1963). He founded the journal Arti musices in 1969 and was a member of the Yugoslav Academy of Sciences and Arts. He died in Zagreb in 1982.

In 2009 Andreis was depicted on a Croatian postage stamp.
