= Erik Ian Asphaug =

American astronomer

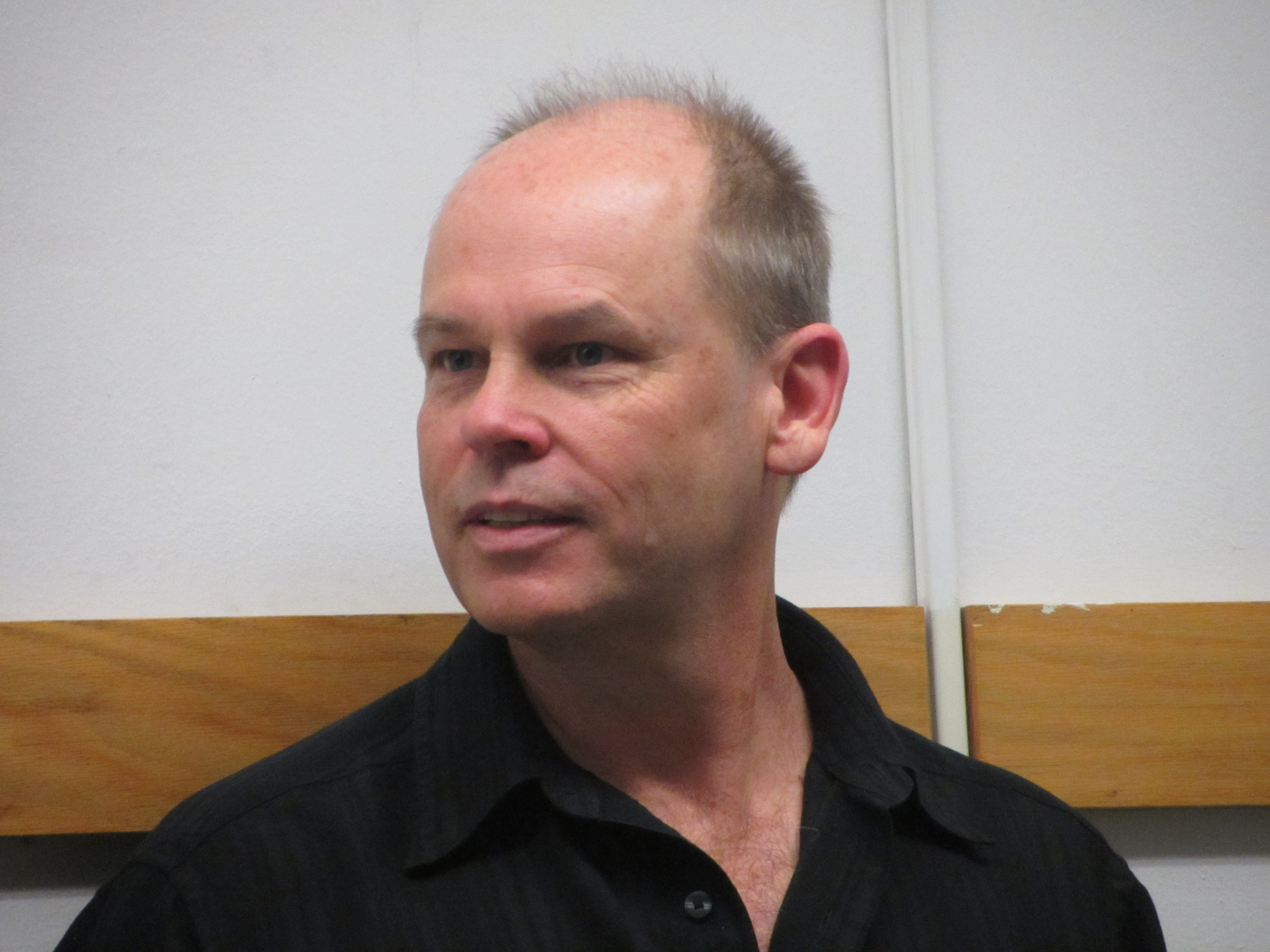
- Born: October 19, 1961 (age 64); Oslo, Norway

Academic background
- Education: Rice University; University of Arizona

Erik Ian Asphaug (born October 19, 1961) is a Norwegian American planetary science professor in the Lunar and Planetary Laboratory at the University of Arizona. Asphaug received his bachelor's degree in mathematics and English from Rice University and his PhD in planetary science from the University of Arizona.

Until 2012, Asphaug served as a professor at the University of California, Santa Cruz.

The 1998 recipient of the Harold C. Urey Prize from the American Astronomical Society, Asphaug is at the forefront of scientists studying the "rubble pile" composition of most asteroids and the implications of such composition on efforts to divert asteroids from striking the Earth. Asphaug has also worked with Urey Prize winner Robin M. Canup to develop new theories on how the Moon was formed. Recently he has studied the genesis of diverse small planets and asteroids in the aftermath of collisions between similar-sized planetoids during the middle to late stages of terrestrial planet formation.

Asphaug was involved in NASA's Galileo and LCROSS missions. He is currently a principal advocate of a mission strategy to obtain a medical-like scan of the detailed interior structure of a Jupiter-family comet, which would reveal its origin, evolution and structure using techniques of 3D radar imaging and tomography.

Asteroid 7939 Asphaug was named in his honor.

== Publications ==
- Asphaug, Erik (May 30, 2014). "Impact Origin of the Moon?". Annual Review of Earth and Planetary Sciences. 42 (1): 551–578. Bibcode:2014AREPS..42..551A. doi:10.1146/annurev-earth-050212-124057. ISSN 0084-6597.
- Asphaug, Erik (2019). When the Earth Had Two Moons: Cannibal Planets, Icy Giants, Dirty Comets, Dreadful Orbits, and the Origins of the Night Sky. HarperCollins. ISBN 978-0-06-265794-7.
- Asphaug, Erik Ian (1993). Dynamic Fragmentation in the Solar System: Applications of Fracture Mechanics and Hydrodynamics to Questions of Planetary Evolution (PhD thesis). University of Arizona. Bibcode:1993PhDT........40A.
