= Theoretical planetology =

Scientific modeling of planets

Sequence of New Horizons images showing Io's volcano Tvashtar spewing material 330 km above its surface. The discovery of volcanism on Io in 1979 by the Voyager 1 spacecraft confirmed the previous prediction made by theoretical planetology and is considered one of the major successes of theoretical planetology.

Theoretical planetology, also known as theoretical planetary science is a branch of planetary sciences that developed in the 20th century. Scientific models supported by laboratory experiments are used to understand the formation, evolution, and internal structure of planets.

== Nature of the work ==
Diagram showing Earth's magnetic field: theoretical planetologists study many aspects of planetary bodies, such as how their magnetic fields are generated in their cores.

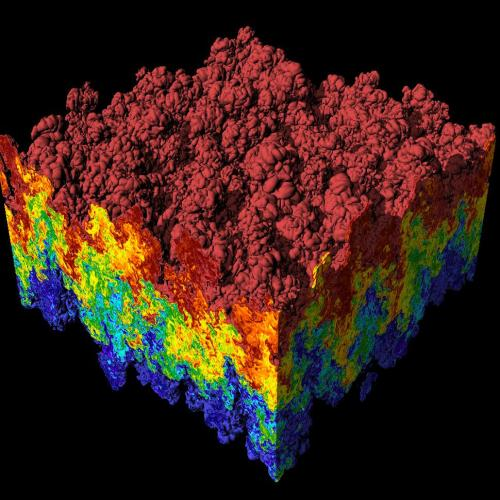
Scientific visualisation of an extremely large simulation of a Rayleigh–Taylor instability caused by two mixing fluids. Theoretical planetology uses computer graphics, scientific visualisation, and fluid dynamics extensively.

Theoretical planetologists study atmospheric circulation over planets.

Theoretical planetologists, also known as theoretical planetary scientists, use modelling techniques to develop an understanding of the internal structure of planets by making assumptions about their chemical composition and the state of their materials, then calculating the radial distribution of various properties such as temperature, pressure, or density of material across the planet's internals.

Theoretical planetologists also use numerical models to understand how the Solar System planets were formed and develop in the future, their thermal evolution, their tectonics, how magnetic fields are formed in planetary interiors, how convection processes work in the cores and mantles of terrestrial planets and in the interiors of gas giants, how their lithospheres deform, the orbital dynamics of planetary satellites, how dust and ice are transported on the surface of some planets (such as Mars), and how the atmospheric circulation takes place over a planet.

Theoretical planetologists may use laboratory experiments to understand various phenomena analogous to planetary processes, such as convection in rotating fluids.

Theoretical planetologists make extensive use of basic physics, particularly fluid dynamics and condensed matter physics, and much of their work involves interpretation of data returned by space missions, although they rarely get actively involved in them.

== Educational requirements ==
Typically a theoretical planetologist will have to have had higher education in physics, astronomy, geophysics, or planetary science, at PhD doctorate level.

== Scientific visualisation ==
Because of the use of scientific visualisation animation, theoretical planetology has a relationship with computer graphics. Example movies exhibiting this relation are the 4-minute "The Origin of the Moon"

== Major successes ==
One of the major successes of theoretical planetology is the prediction and subsequent confirmation of volcanism on Io.

The prediction was made by Stanton J. Peale who wrote a scientific paper claiming that Io must be volcanically active that was published one week before Voyager 1 encountered Jupiter. When Voyager 1 photographed Io in 1979, his theory was confirmed. Later photographs of Io by the Hubble Space Telescope and from the ground also showed volcanoes on Io's surface, and they were extensively studied and photographed by the Galileo orbiter of Jupiter from 1995-2003.

== Criticism ==
D. C. Tozer of University of Newcastle upon Tyne, writing in 1974, expressed the opinion that "it could and will be said that theoretical planetary science is a waste of time" until problems related to "sampling and scaling" are resolved, even though these problems cannot be solved by simply collecting further laboratory data.

== Researchers ==
Researchers working on theoretical planetology include:

- David J. Stevenson
- Jonathan Lunine (University of Arizona professor of theoretical planetology and physics, and Cassini mission scientist specialising on Titan)

== See also ==
- Hypothetical planetary object
- Astronomy
- Space sciences
- Earth sciences
- Geology
