= Robin Canup =

American astrophysicist

Robin M. Canup (born November 20, 1968) is an American planetary scientist. Her main area of research concerns the origins of planets and satellites. In 2003, Canup was awarded the Harold C. Urey Prize. In April, 2022, Canup presented the findings of the Planetary Science Decadal Survey as co-chair of the Survey Steering Committee with Philip R. Christensen.

== Biography ==
She received her B.S. from Duke University and her PhD from the University of Colorado at Boulder.

Canup is known for her research based upon the giant impact hypothesis, using intensive modeling to simulate how planetary collisions unfold. In 2012, Canup first published a refinement to the giant impact hypothesis, arguing that the Moon and the Earth formed in a series of steps that started with a massive collision of two planetary bodies, each larger than Mars, which then re-collided to form what we now call Earth. After the re-collision, Earth was surrounded by a disk of material, which combined to form the Moon. She has written a book on the origin of the Earth and Moon. Canup has also published research describing a giant impact origin for Pluto and Charon.

Canup is an accomplished ballet dancer and danced the lead role in Coppélia in the Boulder Ballet one week after finishing her dissertation.

== Selected works ==
- Origin of the Earth and Moon. Robin M. Canup, Kevin Righter (eds.) (2nd ed.). Tucson : Houston: University of Arizona Press. 2000-11-01. ISBN 978-0-8165-2073-2.
- National Research Council (various) (2010). Defending Planet Earth:: Near-Earth Object Surveys and Hazard Mitigation Strategies. National Academies Press. ISBN 9780309149686. (member of Space Studies board)
- Robin M. Canup, Kevin Righter, Nicolas Dauphas et al.: Origin of the Moon. In: Reviews in Mineralogy and Geochemistry. Vol. 89, No 1. Dec. 2023.
