= David J. Stevenson =

New Zealand planetary scientist (born 1948)

David John Stevenson
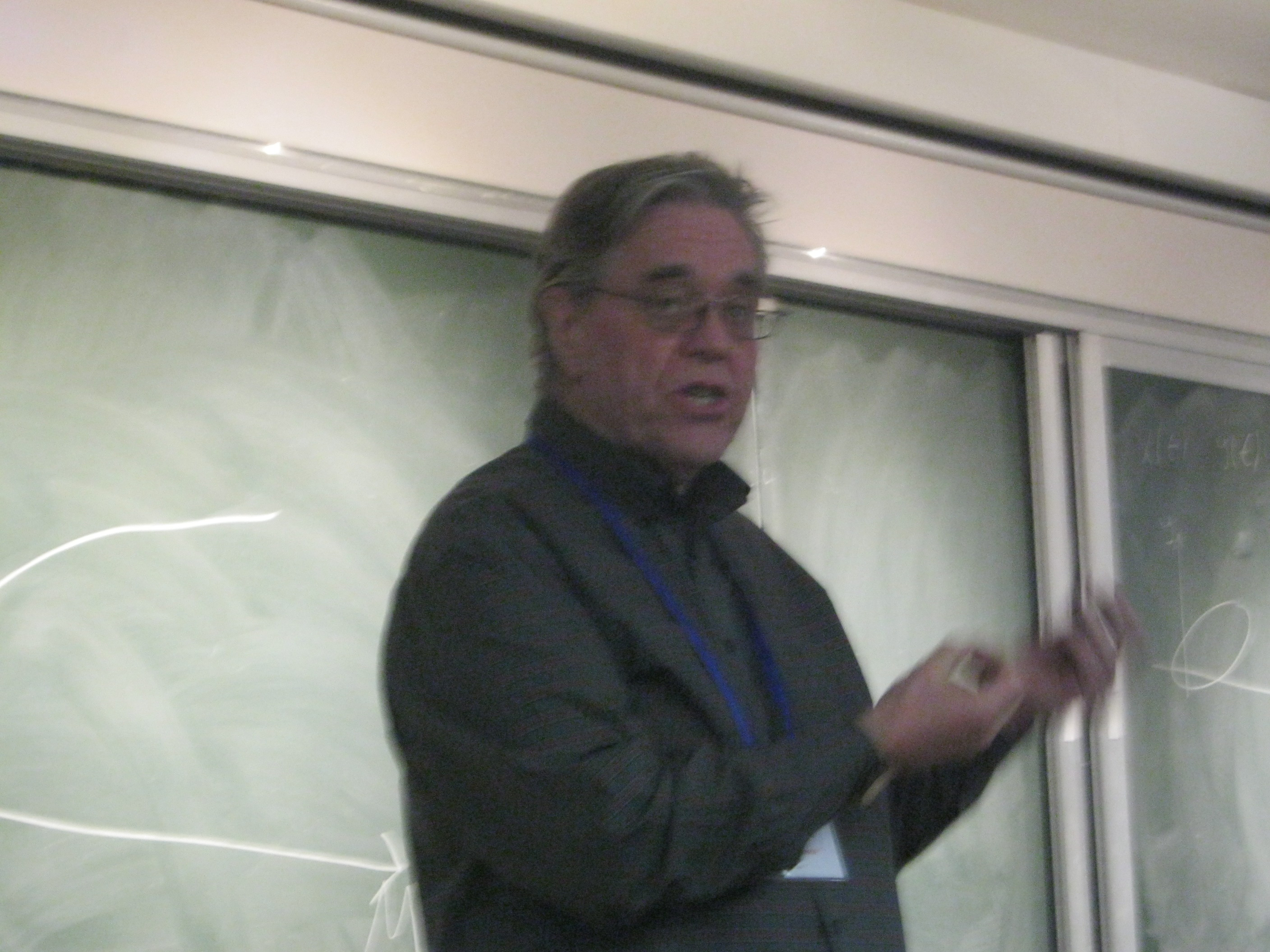
- David J. Stevenson, 2015
- Born: 2 September 1948 (age 77); New Zealand
- Education: Victoria University (B.S., 1971) (M.S., 1972) (D.Sc); Cornell University (PhD, 1976)
- Awards: H. C. Urey Prize (1984); Whipple Award (1994); Harry H. Hess Medal (1998); Richard P. Feynman Prize (2001)
- Scientific career
- Fields: Planetary Science; Earth Science; Astrophysics; Geophysics
- Workplaces: Caltech
- Doctoral advisor: Edwin Salpeter

David John Stevenson (born 2 September 1948) is a professor of planetary science at Caltech. Originally from New Zealand, he received his Ph.D. from Cornell University in physics, where he proposed a model for the interior of Jupiter. He is well known for applying fluid mechanics and magnetohydrodynamics to understand the internal structure and evolution of planets and moons.

== Sending a probe into the Earth ==
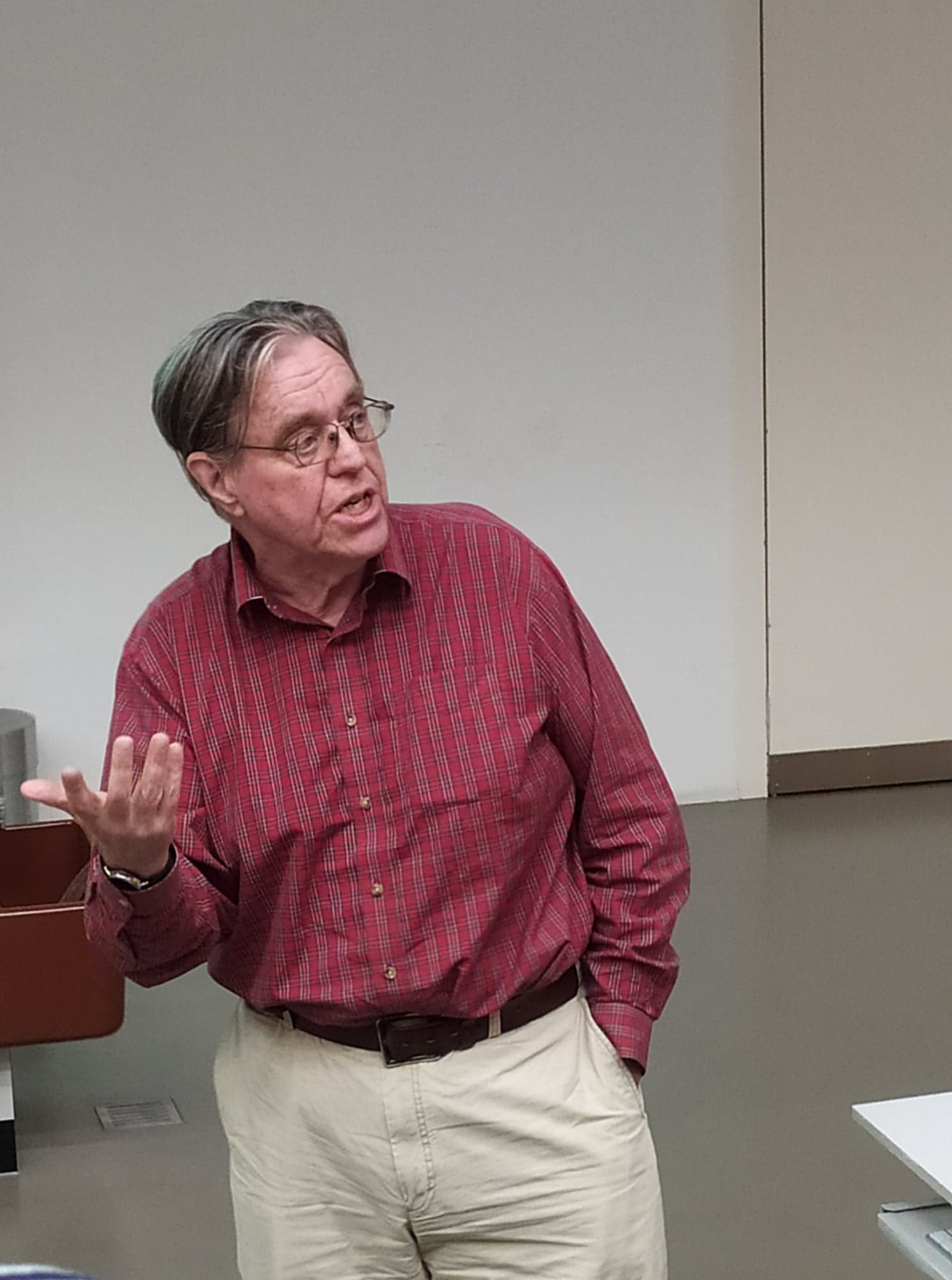
Dave Stevenson on a lecture

Stevenson's tongue-in-cheek idea about sending a probe into the earth includes the use of nuclear weapons to crack the Earth's crust, simultaneously melting and filling the crack with molten iron containing a probe. The iron, by the action of its weight, will propagate a crack into the mantle and would subsequently sink and reach the Earth's core in weeks. Communication with the probe would be achieved with modulated acoustic waves. This idea was used in the book Artemis Fowl: The Opal Deception.

== Honors and awards ==
In 1984, he received the H. C. Urey Prize awarded by the Division for Planetary Sciences of the American Astronomical Society.

Stevenson is a fellow of the Royal Society and a member of the United States National Academy of Sciences.

Minor planet 5211 Stevenson is named in his honor.

== See also ==
- Travel to the Earth's center
- Theoretical planetology
