= University of Rome =

University of Rome may refer to:

- Sapienza University of Rome (University of Rome 1), founded in 1303
- University of Rome Tor Vergata (University of Rome 2), founded in 1982
- Roma Tre University (University of Rome 3), founded in 1992
- Foro Italico University of Rome (University of Rome 4), founded in 1998

== Other universities in Rome ==
- Università Cattolica del Sacro Cuore, Rome satellite campus opened 1961
- Rome University of Fine Arts
- International University of Rome
- American University of Rome
- John Cabot University
- Libera Università Maria SS. Assunta
- Luiss University
- Università Campus Bio-Medico di Roma
- see also Pontifical universities in Rome
