= Planetary science =

Science of planets and planetary systems

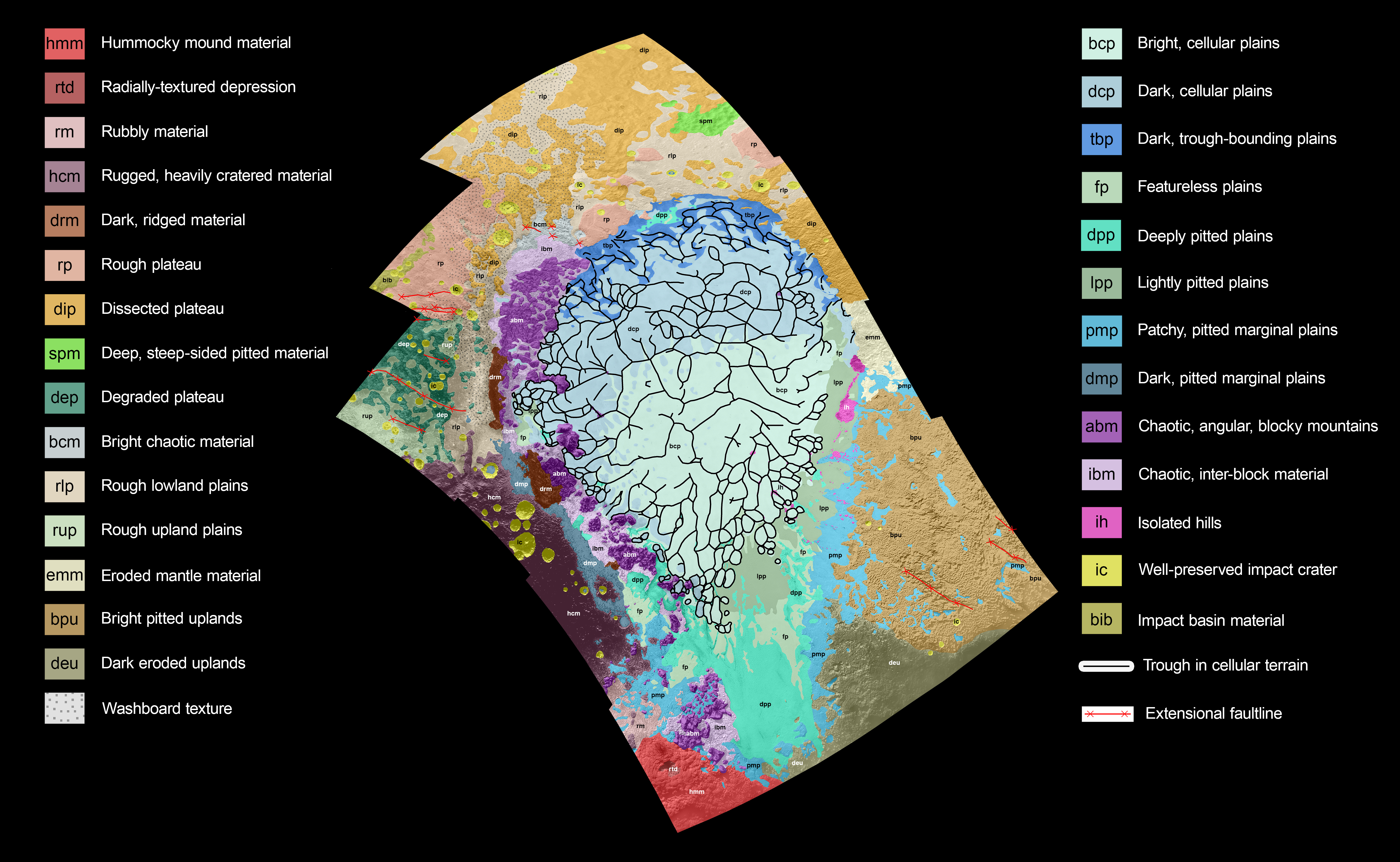
A geological map of the Sputnik Planitia basin on the dwarf planet Pluto. Analysis of planetary surfaces and surface features is a major component of planetary science.

Planetary science (or more rarely, planetology) is the scientific study of celestial bodies (such as planets (including Earth), moons, asteroids, comets) and planetary systems (in particular those of the Solar System) and the processes of their formation. It studies objects ranging in sizes from micrometeoroids to huge gas giants, with the aim of determining their composition, dynamics, formation, interrelations and history.

It is a strongly interdisciplinary field, which originally grew from astronomy and Earth science, and now incorporates many disciplines, including planetary geology, cosmochemistry, atmospheric science, physics, oceanography, hydrology, theoretical planetary science, glaciology, and exoplanetology. Allied disciplines include space physics, when concerned with the effects of the Sun on the bodies of the Solar System, and astrobiology.

There are interrelated observational and theoretical branches of planetary science. Observational research can involve combinations of space exploration, predominantly with robotic spacecraft missions using remote sensing, and comparative, experimental work in Earth-based laboratories. The theoretical component involves considerable computer simulation and mathematical modelling.

Planetary scientists are generally located in the astronomy and physics or Earth sciences departments of universities or research centres, though there are several purely planetary science institutes worldwide. Generally, planetary scientists study one of the Earth sciences, astronomy, astrophysics, geophysics, or physics at the graduate level and concentrate their research in planetary science disciplines. There are several major conferences each year, and a wide range of peer-reviewed journals. Some planetary scientists work at private research centres and often initiate partnership research tasks.

== History ==
The history of planetary science may be said to have begun with the Ancient Greek philosopher Democritus, who is reported by Hippolytus as saying

The ordered worlds are boundless and differ in size, and that in some there is neither sun nor moon, but that in others, both are greater than with us, and yet with others more in number. And that the intervals between the ordered worlds are unequal, here more and there less, and that some increase, others flourish and others decay, and here they come into being and there they are eclipsed. But that they are destroyed by colliding with one another. And that some ordered worlds are bare of animals, plants, and all water. These planets are rocky planets with nothing else, sometimes with an atmosphere, but inhospitable.

In more modern times, planetary science began in astronomy, from studies of the unresolved planets. In this sense, the original planetary astronomer would be Galileo, who discovered the four largest moons of Jupiter, the mountains on the Moon, and first observed the rings of Saturn, all objects of intense later study. Galileo's study of the lunar mountains in 1609 also began the study of extraterrestrial landscapes: his observation "that the Moon certainly does not possess a smooth and polished surface" suggested that it and other worlds might appear "just like the face of the Earth itself".

Advances in telescope construction and instrumental resolution gradually allowed increased identification of the atmospheric as well as surface details of the planets. The Moon was initially the most heavily studied, due to its proximity to the Earth, as it always exhibited elaborate features on its surface, and the technological improvements gradually produced more detailed lunar geological knowledge. In this scientific process, the main instruments were astronomical optical telescopes (and later radio telescopes) and finally robotic exploratory spacecraft, such as space probes.

The Solar System has now been relatively well-studied, and a good overall understanding of the formation and evolution of this planetary system exists. However, there are large numbers of unsolved questions, and the rate of new discoveries is very high, partly due to the large number of interplanetary spacecraft currently exploring the Solar System.

== Disciplines ==
Planetary science studies observational and theoretical astronomy, geology (astrogeology), atmospheric science, and an emerging subspecialty in planetary oceans, called planetary oceanography.

=== Planetary astronomy ===
This is both an observational and a theoretical science. Observational researchers are predominantly concerned with the study of the small bodies of the Solar System: those that are observed by telescopes, both optical and radio, so that characteristics of these bodies such as shape, spin, surface materials and weathering are determined, and the history of their formation and evolution can be understood.

Theoretical planetary astronomy is concerned with dynamics: the application of the principles of celestial mechanics to the Solar System and extrasolar planetary systems. Observing exoplanets and determining their physical properties, exoplanetology, is a major area of research besides Solar System studies. Every planet has its own branch.

=== Planetary geology ===
In planetary science, the term geology is used in its broadest sense, to mean the study of the surface and interior parts of planets and moons, from their core to their magnetosphere. The best-known research topics of planetary geology deal with the planetary bodies in the near vicinity of the Earth: the Moon, and the two neighboring planets: Venus and Mars. Of these, the Moon was studied first, using methods developed earlier on the Earth. Planetary geology focuses on celestial objects that exhibit a solid surface or have significant solid physical states as part of their structure. Planetary geology applies geology, geophysics and geochemistry to planetary bodies.

==== Planetary geomorphology ====
Geomorphology studies the features on planetary surfaces and reconstructs the history of their formation, inferring the physical processes that acted on the surface. Planetary geomorphology includes the study of several classes of surface features:

- Impact features (multi-ringed basins, craters)
- Volcanic and tectonic features (lava flows, fissures, rilles)
- Glacial features
- Aeolian features
- Space weathering – erosional effects generated by the harsh environment of space (continuous micrometeorite bombardment, high-energy particle rain, impact gardening). For example, the thin dust cover on the surface of the lunar regolith is a result of micrometeorite bombardment.
- Hydrological features: the liquid involved can range from water to hydrocarbon and ammonia, depending on the location within the Solar System. This category includes the study of paleohydrological features (paleochannels, paleolakes).

The history of a planetary surface can be deciphered by mapping features from top to bottom according to their deposition sequence, as first determined on terrestrial strata by Nicolas Steno. For example, stratigraphic mapping prepared the Apollo astronauts for the field geology they would encounter on their lunar missions. Overlapping sequences were identified on images taken by the Lunar Orbiter program, and these were used to prepare a lunar stratigraphic column and geological map of the Moon.

==== Cosmochemistry, geochemistry and petrology ====
One of the main problems when generating hypotheses on the formation and evolution of objects in the Solar System is the lack of samples that can be analyzed in the laboratory, where a large suite of tools are available, and the full body of knowledge derived from terrestrial geology can be brought to bear. Direct samples from the Moon, asteroids and Mars are present on Earth, removed from their parent bodies, and delivered as meteorites. Some of these have suffered contamination from the oxidising effect of Earth's atmosphere and the infiltration of the biosphere, but those meteorites collected in the last few decades from Antarctica are almost entirely pristine.

The different types of meteorites that originate from the asteroid belt cover almost all parts of the structure of differentiated bodies: meteorites even exist that come from the core-mantle boundary (pallasites). The combination of geochemistry and observational astronomy has also made it possible to trace the HED meteorites back to a specific asteroid in the main belt, 4 Vesta.

The comparatively few known Martian meteorites have provided insight into the geochemical composition of the Martian crust, although the unavoidable lack of information about their points of origin on the diverse Martian surface has meant that they do not provide more detailed constraints on theories of the evolution of the Martian lithosphere. As of July 24, 2013, 65 samples of Martian meteorites have been discovered on Earth. Many were found in either Antarctica or the Sahara Desert.

During the Apollo era, in the Apollo program, 384 kilograms of lunar samples were collected and transported to the Earth, and three Soviet Luna robots also delivered regolith samples from the Moon. These samples provide the most comprehensive record of the composition of any Solar System body besides the Earth. The numbers of lunar meteorites are growing quickly in the last few years – as of April 2008 there are 54 meteorites that have been officially classified as lunar. Eleven of these are from the US Antarctic meteorite collection, 6 are from the Japanese Antarctic meteorite collection and the other 37 are from hot desert localities in Africa, Australia, and the Middle East. The total mass of recognized lunar meteorites is close to 50 kg (110 lb).

==== Planetary geophysics and space physics ====
Space probes made it possible to collect data in not only the visible light region but in other areas of the electromagnetic spectrum. The planets can be characterized by their force fields: gravity and their magnetic fields, which are studied through geophysics and space physics.

Measuring the changes in acceleration experienced by spacecraft as they orbit has allowed fine details of the gravity fields of the planets to be mapped. For example, in the 1970s, the gravity field disturbances above lunar maria were measured through lunar orbiters, which led to the discovery of concentrations of mass, mascons, beneath the Imbrium, Serenitatis, Crisium, Nectaris and Humorum basins.

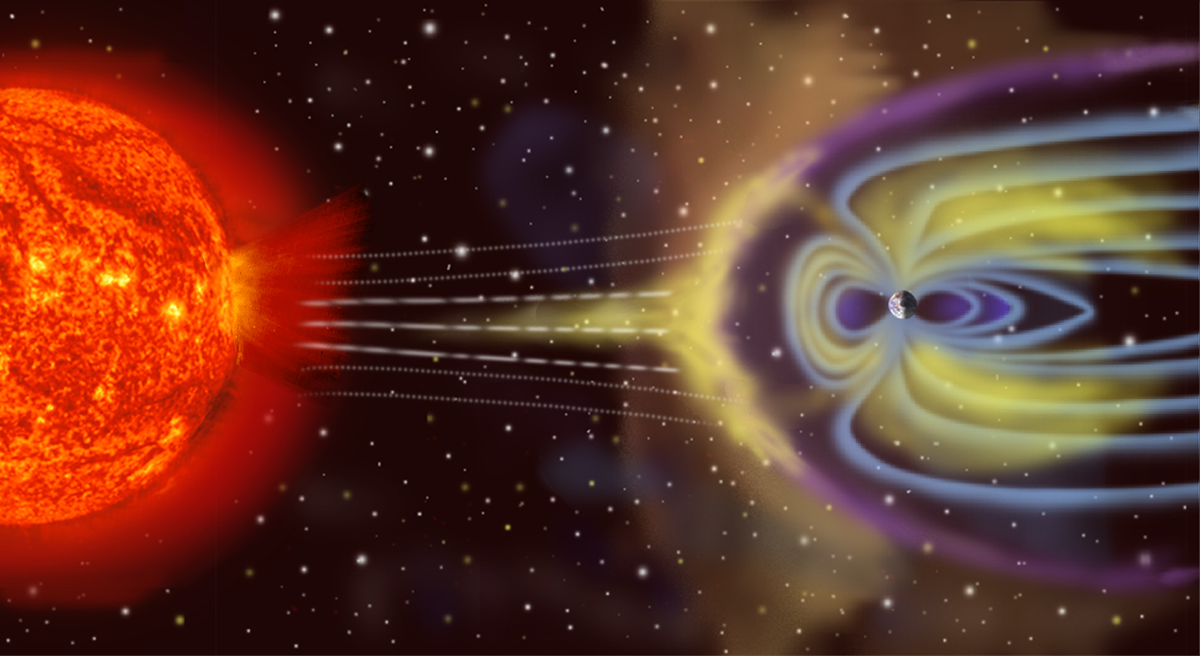
The solar wind is deflected by the magnetosphere (not to scale).

If a planet's magnetic field is sufficiently strong, its interaction with the solar wind forms a magnetosphere around a planet. Early space probes discovered the gross dimensions of the terrestrial magnetic field, which extends about 10 Earth radii towards the Sun. The solar wind, a stream of charged particles, streams out and around the terrestrial magnetic field, and continues behind the magnetic tail, hundreds of Earth radii downstream. Inside the magnetosphere, there are relatively dense regions of solar wind particles, the Van Allen radiation belts.

Planetary geophysics includes, but is not limited to, seismology and tectonophysics, geophysical fluid dynamics, mineral physics, geodynamics, mathematical geophysics, and geophysical surveying.

==== Planetary geodesy ====
Planetary geodesy (also known as planetary geodetics) deals with the measurement and representation of the planets of the Solar System, their gravitational fields and geodynamic phenomena (polar motion in three-dimensional, time-varying space). The science of geodesy has elements of both astrophysics and planetary sciences. The shape of the Earth is to a large extent the result of its rotation, which causes its equatorial bulge, and the competition of geologic processes such as the collision of plates and of vulcanism, resisted by the Earth's gravity field. These principles can be applied to the solid surface of Earth (orogeny; Few mountains are higher than 10 km (6 mi), few deep sea trenches deeper than that because quite simply, a mountain as tall as, for example, 15 km (9 mi), would develop so much pressure at its base, due to gravity, that the rock there would become plastic, and the mountain would slump back to a height of roughly 10 km (6 mi) in a geologically insignificant time. Some or all of these geologic principles can be applied to other planets besides Earth. For instance on Mars, whose surface gravity is much less, the largest volcano, Olympus Mons, is 27 km (17 mi) high at its peak, a height that could not be maintained on Earth. The Earth geoid is essentially the figure of the Earth abstracted from its topographic features. Therefore, the Mars geoid (areoid) is essentially the figure of Mars abstracted from its topographic features. Surveying and mapping are two important fields of application of geodesy.

=== Planetary atmospheric science ===
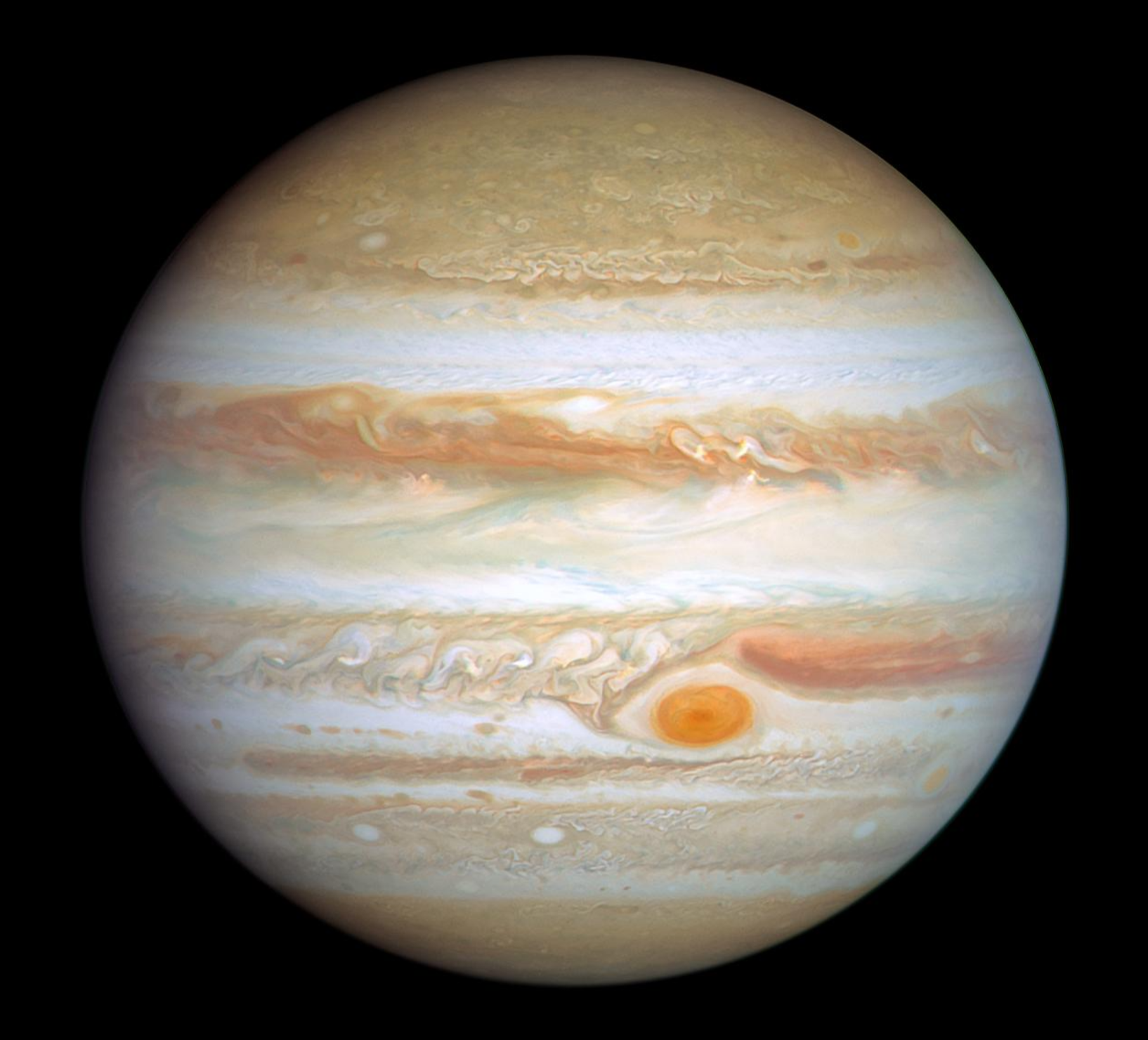
Cloud bands clearly visible on Jupiter

An atmosphere is an important transitional zone between the solid planetary surface and the higher rarefied ionizing and radiation belts. Not all planets have atmospheres: their existence depends on the mass of the planet, and the planet's distance from the Sun – too distant and frozen atmospheres occur. Besides the four giant planets, three of the four terrestrial planets (Earth, Venus, and Mars) have significant atmospheres. Two moons have significant atmospheres: Saturn's moon Titan and Neptune's moon Triton. A tenuous atmosphere exists around Mercury.

The effects of the rotation rate of a planet about its axis can be seen in atmospheric streams and currents. Seen from space, these features show as bands and eddies in the cloud system and are particularly visible on Jupiter and Saturn.

=== Exoplanetology ===
Exoplanetology studies exoplanets, the planets existing outside of the Solar System. Until recently, the means of studying exoplanets have been extremely limited, but with the current rate of innovation in research technology, exoplanetology has become a rapidly developing subfield of astronomy.

== Comparative planetary science ==
Planetary science frequently makes use of the method of comparison to give a greater understanding of the object of study. This can involve comparing the dense atmospheres of Earth and Saturn's moon Titan, the evolution of outer Solar System objects at different distances from the Sun, or the geomorphology of the surfaces of the terrestrial planets, to give only a few examples.

The main comparison that can be made is to features on the Earth, as it is much more accessible and allows a much greater range of measurements to be made. Earth analog studies are particularly common in planetary geology, geomorphology, and also in atmospheric science.

The use of terrestrial analogs was first described by Gilbert (1886).

== In fiction ==
- In Frank Herbert's 1965 science fiction novel Dune, the major secondary character Liet-Kynes serves as the "Imperial Planetologist" for the fictional planet Arrakis, a position he inherited from his father Pardot Kynes. In this role, a planetologist is described as having skills of an ecologist, geologist, meteorologist, and biologist, as well as basic understandings of human sociology. The planetologists apply this expertise to the study of entire planets. In the Dune series, planetologists are employed to understand planetary resources and to plan terraforming or other planetary-scale engineering projects. This fictional position in Dune has had an impact on the discourse surrounding planetary science itself and is referred to by one author as a "touchstone" within the related disciplines. In one example, a publication by Sybil P. Seitzinger in the journal Nature opens with a brief introduction on the fictional role in Dune, and suggests that humans should consider appointing individuals with similar skills to Liet-Kynes to help with managing their activity on Earth.

== Professional activity ==
=== Journals ===
- Annual Review of Earth and Planetary Sciences
- Earth and Planetary Science Letters
- Earth, Moon, and Planets
- Geochimica et Cosmochimica Acta
- Icarus
- Journal of Geophysical Research – Planets
- Meteoritics and Planetary Science
- Planetary and Space Science
- The Planetary Science Journal
- Journal of Geophysical Research (and sub divisions)

=== Professional bodies ===
This non-exhaustive list includes those institutions and universities with major groups of people working in planetary science. Alphabetical order is used.

- Division for Planetary Sciences (DPS) of the American Astronomical Society
- American Geophysical Union
- Meteoritical Society
- Europlanet

==== Government space agencies ====
- Canadian Space Agency (CSA)
- China National Space Administration (CNSA, People's Republic of China).
- Centre national d'études spatiales French National Centre of Space Research
- Deutsches Zentrum für Luft- und Raumfahrt e.V., (German: abbreviated DLR), the German Aerospace Center
- European Space Agency (ESA)
- Indian Space Research Organisation (ISRO)
- Israel Space Agency (ISA)
- Italian Space Agency
- Japan Aerospace Exploration Agency (JAXA)
- NASA (National Aeronautics and Space Administration, United States of America)
  - JPL
  - GSFC
  - Ames
- National Space Organization (Taiwan).
- Russian Federal Space Agency
- UK Space Agency (UKSA).

=== Major conferences ===
- Lunar and Planetary Science Conference (LPSC), organized by the Lunar and Planetary Institute in Houston. Held annually since 1970, occurs in March.
- Division for Planetary Sciences (DPS) meeting held annually since 1970 at a different location each year, predominantly within the mainland US. Occurs around October.
- American Geophysical Union (AGU) annual Fall meeting in December in San Francisco.
- American Geophysical Union (AGU) Joint Assembly (co-sponsored with other societies) in April–May, in various locations around the world.
- Meteoritical Society annual meeting, held during the Northern Hemisphere summer, generally alternating between North America and Europe.
- European Planetary Science Congress (EPSC), held annually around September at a location within Europe.

Smaller workshops and conferences on particular fields occur worldwide throughout the year.

== See also ==
- Areography (geography of Mars)
- Planetary cartography
- Planetary coordinate system
- Selenography – study of the surface and physical features of the Moon
- Theoretical planetology
- Timeline of Solar System exploration
