= Maarten Boudry =

Belgian philosopher (born 1984)

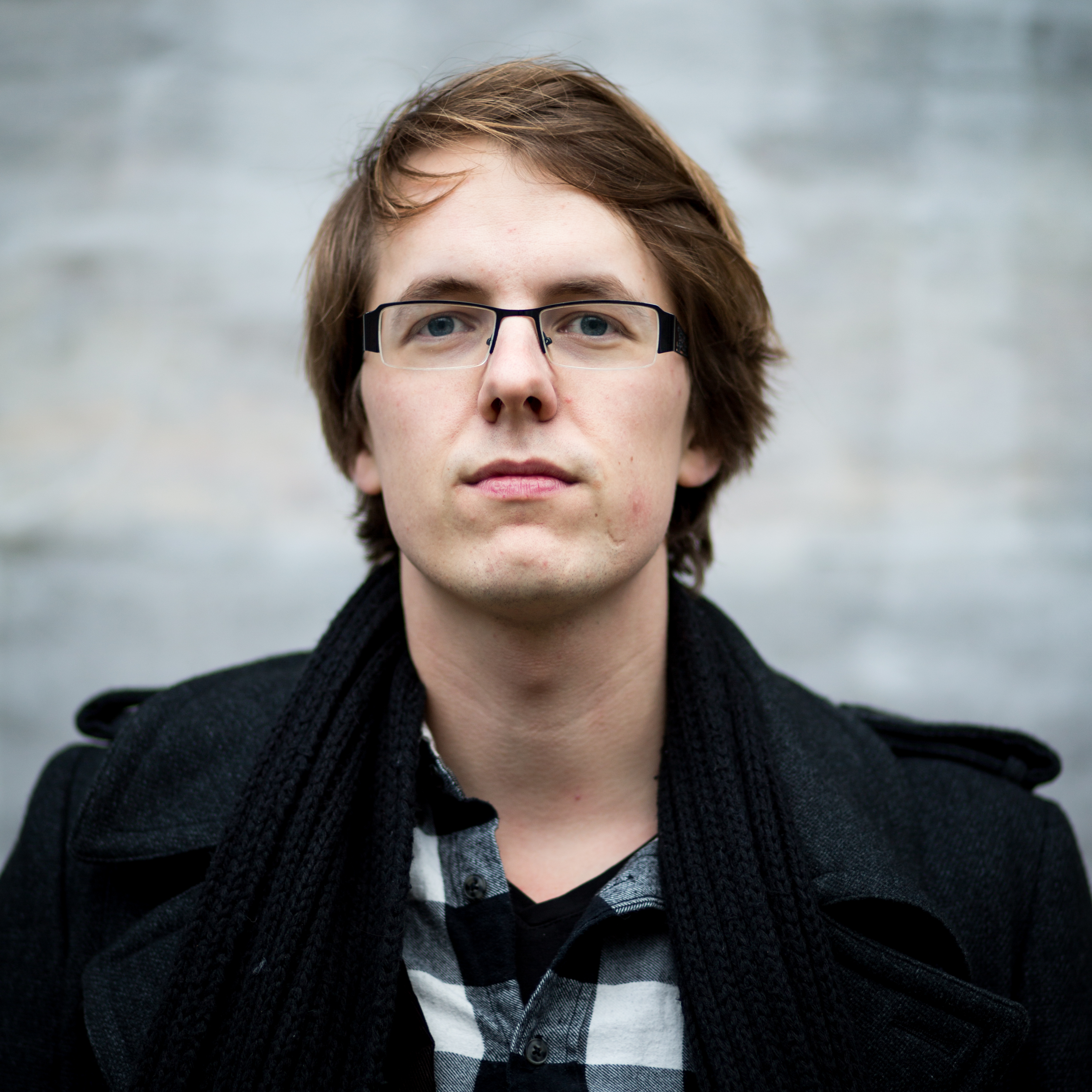
- Boudry in 2014
- Born: 15 August 1984 (age 42); Moorslede, Belgium
- Occupation: Philosopher

Education
- Education: Ghent University (PhD)

Philosophical work
- Main interests: Philosophy of science, epistemology, skepticism, pseudoscience
- Website: Maarten Boudry Maarten Boudry's voice Recorded June 2015

Maarten Boudry (born 15 August 1984) is a Belgian academic and skeptic. He has been a researcher in philosophy and moral sciences at Ghent University from 2006 until 2025.

== Education ==
Boudry began his studies in philosophy at Ghent University in 2002, where he graduated with honors in 2006. Between 2007 and 2011, he conducted research at Ghent University in "logic, history, and philosophy of science", funded by a research grant from the Flemish foundation Fonds Wetenschappelijk Onderzoek (FWO). After obtaining a Ph.D., he became a postdoctoral fellow at Ghent University, again with the financial support of the FWO. In 2013, he was also a postdoctoral fellow at the Konrad Lorenz Institute in Vienna for six months, where he worked on the philosophical underpinnings of irrationality.

Boudry is a member of a number of organizations: the Flemish skeptical organization SKEPP, the Society for the Scientific Study of Religion, the Center for Inquiry and the Imperfect Cognition research network of the Epistemic Innocence Project. He is also one of the founders of Het Denkgelag, which organizes skeptical conferences in Flanders.

== Sokal affair ==
In 2011, Boudry pulled a Sokal-style hoax. Boudry wanted to put Christian philosophers to the test by writing a meaningless abstract, full of theological jargon, with the title "The Paradoxes of Darwinian Disorder. Towards an Ontological Reaffirmation of Order and Transcendence". The abstract contained sentences such as, "In the Darwinian perspective, order is not immanent in reality, but it is a self-affirming aspect of reality in so far as it is experienced by situated subjects." Under the anagram-pseudonym Robert A. Maundy from the fictitious College of the Holy Cross in Reno, Nevada, Boudry submitted the abstract to the organizers of the Christian philosophical conference "The Future of Creation Order" at the VU University Amsterdam and the Centre of Theology and Philosophy at the University of Nottingham, which both accepted it without any reservations. The hoax, which Boudry revealed in mid-2012 on Facebook but became more widely known only after the American scientist Jerry Coyne blogged about it, received attention in a number of Dutch Protestant newspapers such as Reformatorisch Dagblad, Trouw, and Nederlands Dagblad.

When asked in an interview with the Dutch popular philosophy magazine Filosofie Magazine about the reason for the hoax, Boudry said the following:

This was primarily a satirical prank for me, an exercise in grammatically correct nonsense, filled with hollow phrases and theological jargon. In that sense I seem to have succeeded, because the text was credible enough for two theology and philosophy of religion conferences: namely the conference at VU, and the 'What is life' conference, organized by the Centre of Theology and Philosophy of Nottingham University.

No one had discovered that "Robert A. Maundy" and the "College of the Holy Cross" did not exist. Gerrit Glas, president of the conference at the time, found the text to be odd and said they had hesitated for a long time, but ultimately decided to give "Maundy" the benefit of the doubt. Glas admitted that he should have been more critical and defended himself by saying that "it is not uncommon for texts on process theology, negative theology, and postmodernism to be inscrutable". Philosopher of religion Taede A. Smedes at the Radboud University Nijmegen considered Boudry's action to be unworthy of an academic, but also found it astonishing that the conference organizers had accepted the text: "Anyone who makes the simple effort to understand the first sentences of Boudry/Maundry's [sic] abstract (if that is even possible), will immediately notice that it is incomprehensible nonsense."

== Skepticism ==
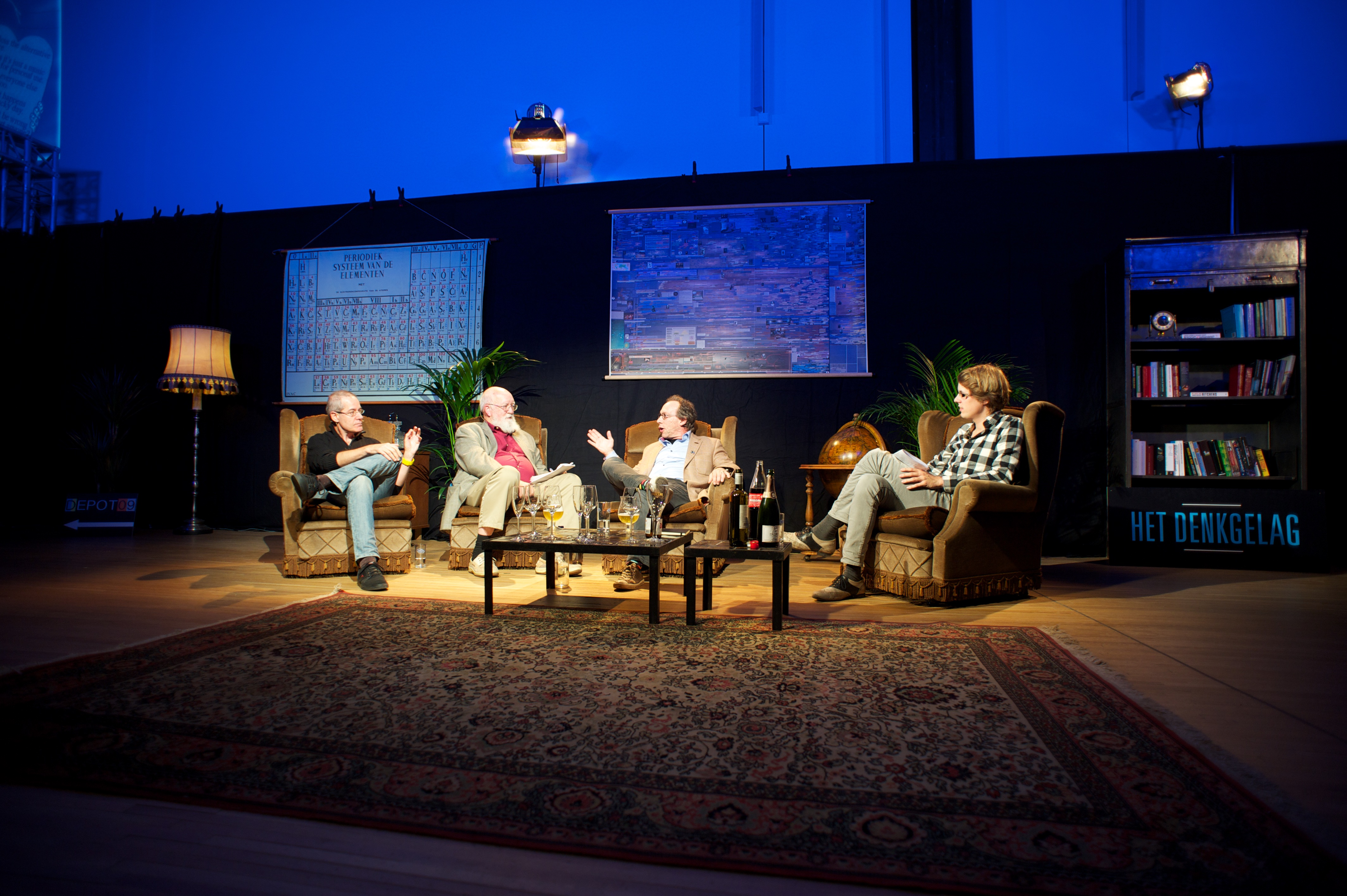
Boudry moderating a debate between Pigliucci, Dennett and Krauss (Het Denkgelag 2013)

Boudry is mainly known for his criticism of activist movements and critical attitude toward pseudoscience. In his MA thesis, entitled De naakte Keizers van de Psychoanalyse (The Naked Emperors of Psychoanalysis), he explains why he classifies psychoanalysis as a pseudoscience and which immunizing strategies this school of thought has developed over the years to withstand criticism. Together with philosopher Johan Braeckman he wrote the book De ongelovige Thomas heeft een punt (Doubting Thomas has a point), a guide to critical thinking that critiques pseudoscience, superstition and religious claims, discussing why people adopt irrational beliefs and how such beliefs can persist through fallacious reasoning and cognitive biases. The title refers to the attitude of Thomas the Apostle, who was initially skeptical when he was told that Jesus had been resurrected.

In publications and debates, Boudry also criticizes religion, intelligent design, and theology. In 2014, during the Dutch Nationale Religiedebat (National Religion Debate), philosophers Maarten Boudry and Herman Philipse (both of whom are atheists) debated Stefan Paas and Rik Peels on the question of whether belief in a god is reasonable and what the impact of nonbelief on morality is. Boudry also debated Christian philosopher Emanuel Rutten during the Denkcafé debate "Does God Exist?" in December 2012, where he said the following:

Of course we can't exclude the existence of God. But you can say the same about the Loch Ness Monster. We could also introduce another all-knowing being: the Unicorn, an intelligent ungulate. That animal knows everything, also that God doesn't exist. Or maybe God is the victim of an evil demon. He may know that he himself exists, but there could be a demon who tricked him into thinking he's the creator of heaven and earth.

== Awards ==
- 2007: SKEPP-prize for best thesis on immunizing strategies in psychoanalysis.
- 2011: Liberales book of the year for De ongelovige Thomas heeft een punt
- 2012: Shortlist ‘Socrates Wisselbeker Filosofie’ for the book De ongelovige Thomas heeft een punt
- 2013: Shortlist Science Communication Award, Royal Flemish Academy of Belgium for Science and the Arts

== Bibliography ==
- 2006, De naakte Keizers van de Psychoanalyse. De Immunisatiestrategieën van een Pseudowetenschap (MA thesis)
- 2011, Here be Dragons. Exploring the Hinterland of Science (PhD dissertation)
- 2011, De ongelovige Thomas heeft een punt (co-author Johan Braeckman), Houtekiet, ISBN 978-9089241887
- 2013, Philosophy of Pseudoscience: Reconsidering the Demarcation Problem (co-author Massimo Pigliucci), ISBN 978-0226051963
- 2015, Illusies voor gevorderden. Of waarom waarheid altijd beter is, Polis, ISBN 978-94-6310-006-9
- 2018, Science Unlimited?: The Challenges of Scientism (co-author Massimo Pigliucci) ISBN 978-0226498140
- 2019, Waarom de wereld niet naar de knoppen gaat, Polis, ISBN 978-94-6310-309-1
- 2019, Alles wat in dit boek staat is waar (en andere denkfouten), Polis (co-author Jeroen Hopster, Polis, ISBN 978-94-6310-477-7
- 2025, Het verraad aan de verlichting: Pleidooi voor een nieuwe vooruitgangsbeweging, Prometheus, ISBN 9789044654356
