= Het Denkgelag =

Belgian skeptics organization

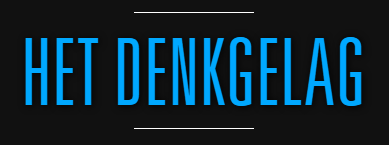

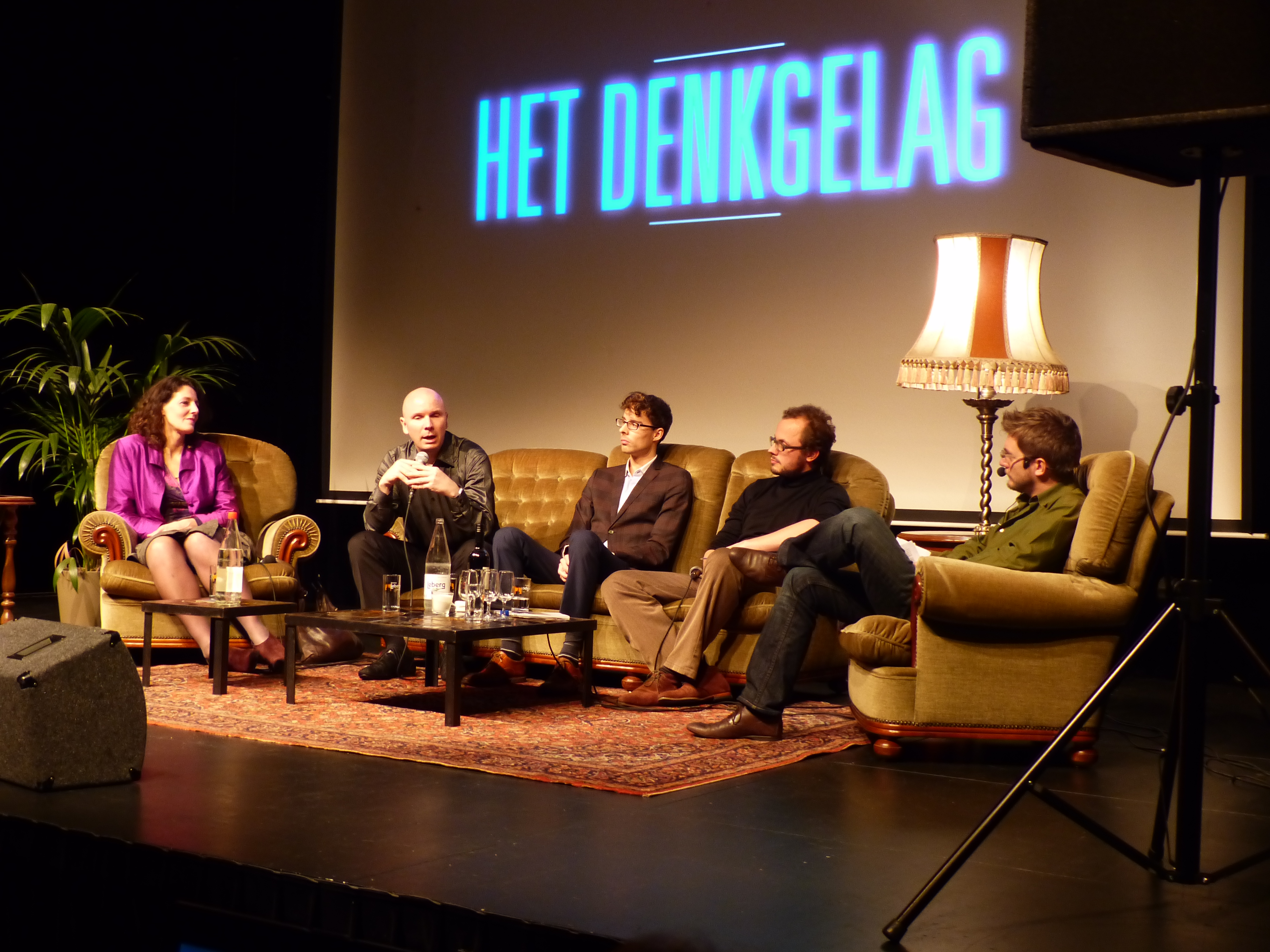
- Het Denkgelag 2014
- Formation: 2012
- Type: non-profit
- Purpose: Bringing together interesting speakers to stimulate public discussion on science and reason and to foster critical thinking
- Headquarters: Ghent
- Region served: Flanders
- Official language: Dutch, English
- Chair: Pieter Brauwers
- Parent organization: SKEPP
- Volunteers: 9
- Website: Denkgelag.be Pronunciation of 'Het Denkgelag'

Het Denkgelag is a Belgian association without lucrative purpose that organises skeptical conferences in Flanders. Het Denkgelag started out in 2012 as a series of discussion evenings of the skeptical organisation SKEPP, but nowadays functions financially and legally independent from SKEPP. The mission of Het Denkgelag is to popularise scientific topics and to promote critical thinking for a broad audience. It has been described as “laid-back discussion evenings on philosophical, skeptical and scientific topics, in an informal atmosphere, with a crowd of interesting speakers and the audience as the central guest”.

== Events ==
The first series of lectures and discussions of Het Denkgelag took place in late 2012 in the cultural centre De Centrale in Ghent. Speakers included Johan Braeckman, Farah Focquaert, Chris French, Alicja Gescinska, Jürgen Mettepenningen, Stephen Law, Patrick Loobuyck, Herman Philipse, Emanuel Rutten, Jean Paul Van Bendegem and Dirk Verhofstadt.

On 17 October 2013, Het Denkgelag organised the "Debate on the Limits of Science" in the Leon De Meyer auditorium (1000 seats) at the Universiteitsforum (UFO) of Ghent University. The debate was held between Daniel Dennett, Lawrence M. Krauss and Massimo Pigliucci, moderated by Maarten Boudry.

The debate "Van aap tot robot. Debat over transhumanisme" ("From Ape to Robot. Debate on Transhumanism") with Kris Verburgh, Pieter Bonte, Philippe van Nedervelde and Martijntje Smits, presented by Brecht Decoene, was held on 27 November 2014 in De Centrale.

On 26 January 2015 in the Stadsschouwburg Antwerpen (City Theatre of Antwerp, 2000 seats), the documentary The Unbelievers was screened, and the discussion "A Passion for Science and Reason" was held between Richard Dawkins and Lawrence M. Krauss, moderated by Julia Galef.

On 12 March 2015 in the Miry Concertzaal, together with TEDx Ghent, Het Denkgelag hosted a series of lectures by Michael Shermer (how science and reason make the word a better place), Hugo Mercier (why people engage in discussions with each other), Carolyn Declerck (why economic interests force people to cooperate), Pieter Buteneers (how artificial intelligence can help disabled people in the future) and a debate on the technological singularity amongst other topics, led by Ruben Mersch.

== Gallery ==
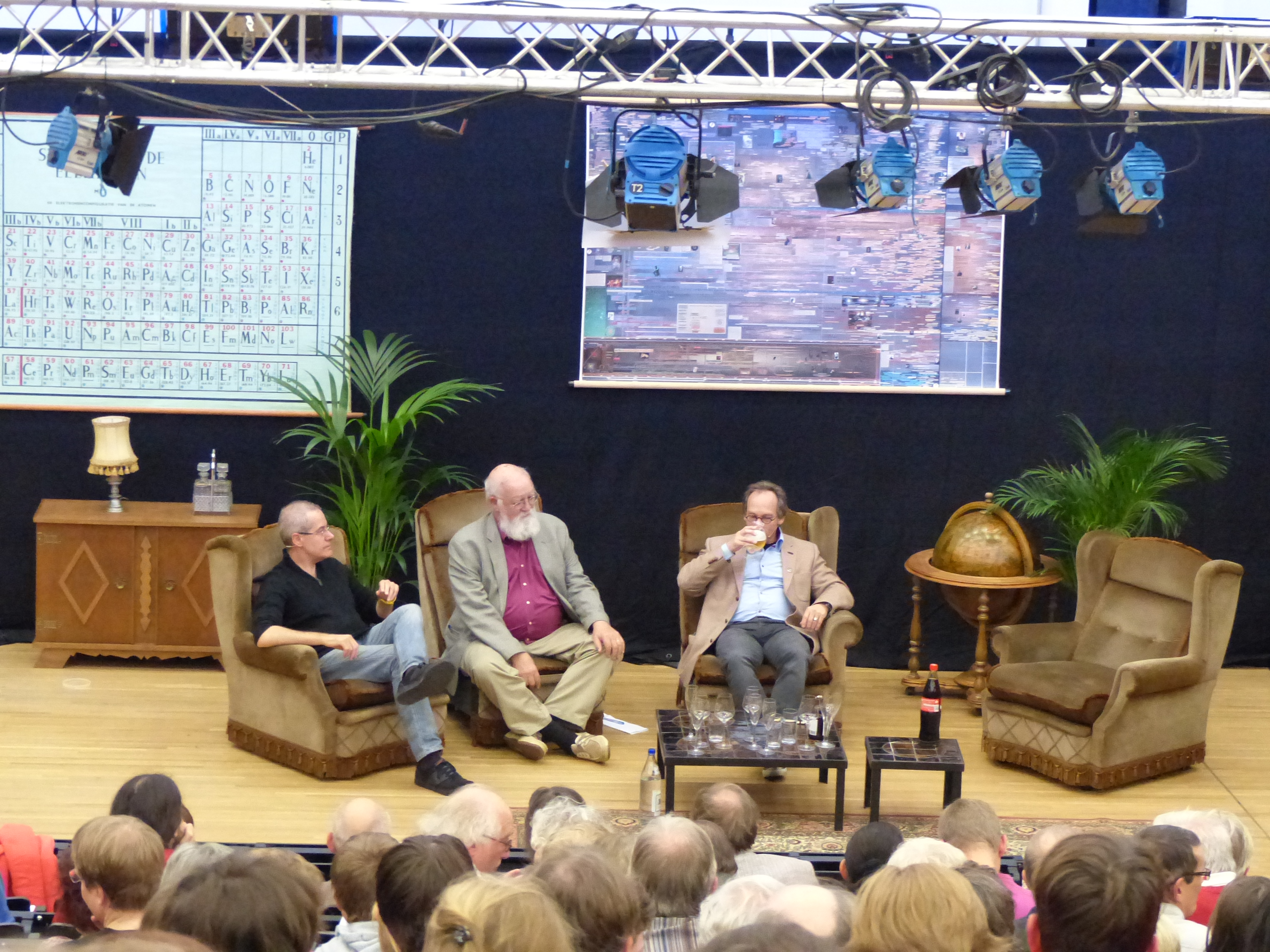
Pigliucci, Dennett and Krauss in 2013

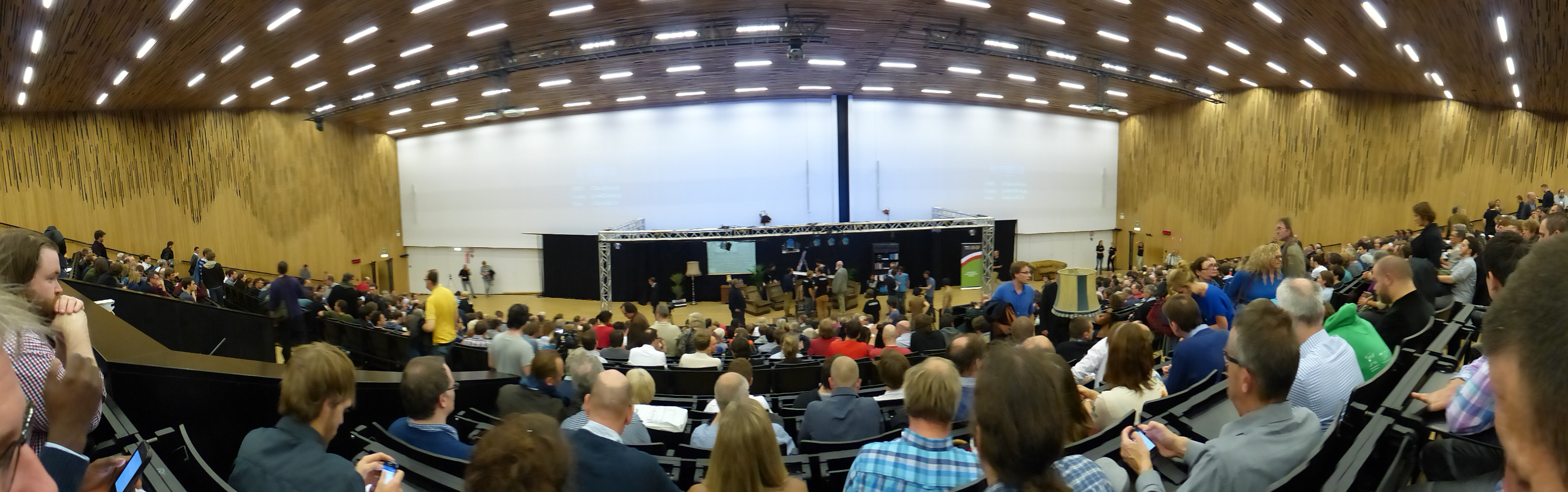
Panorama of 'The Limits of Science'

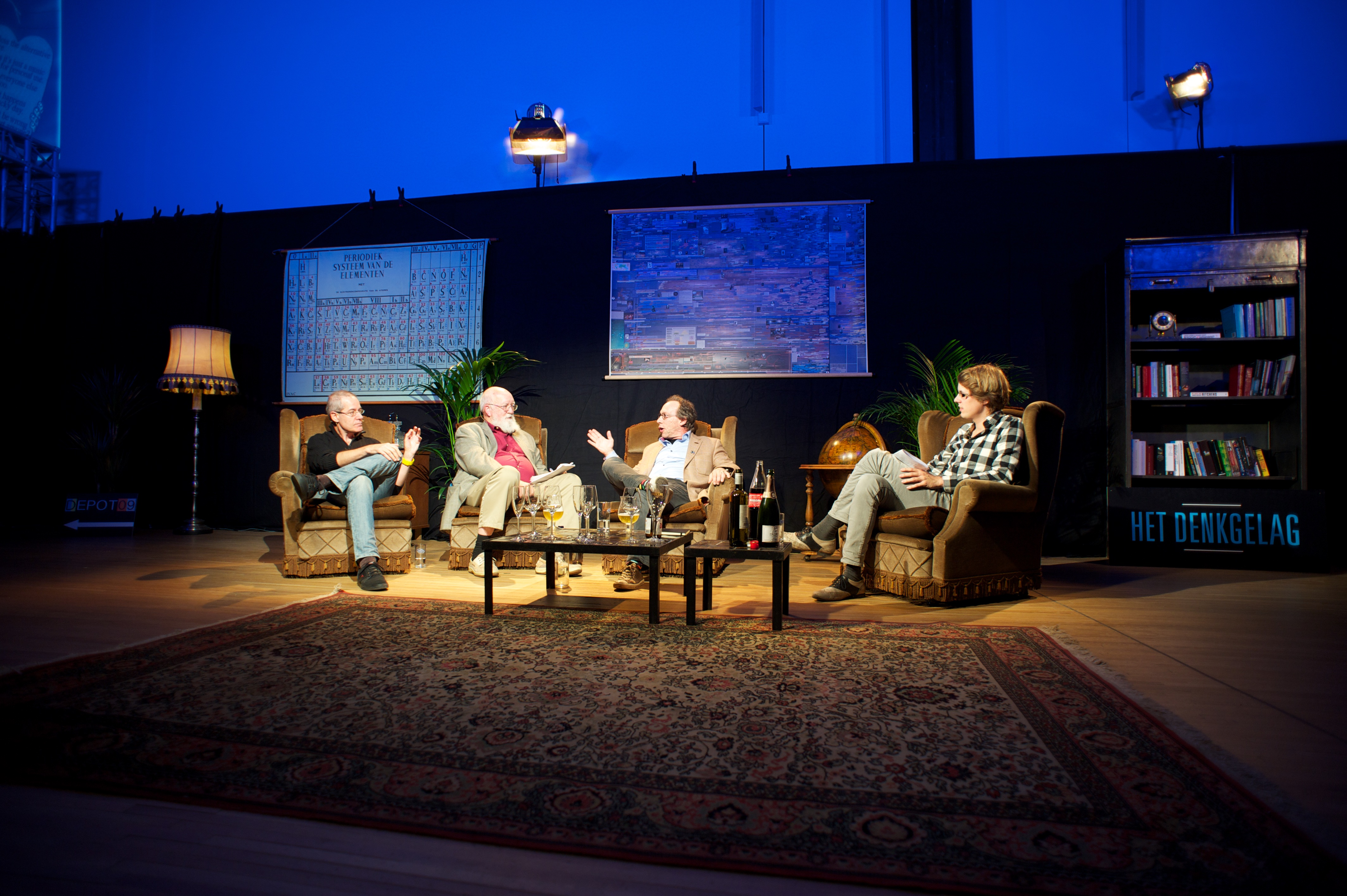
Pigliucci, Dennett, Krauss and Boudry in debate

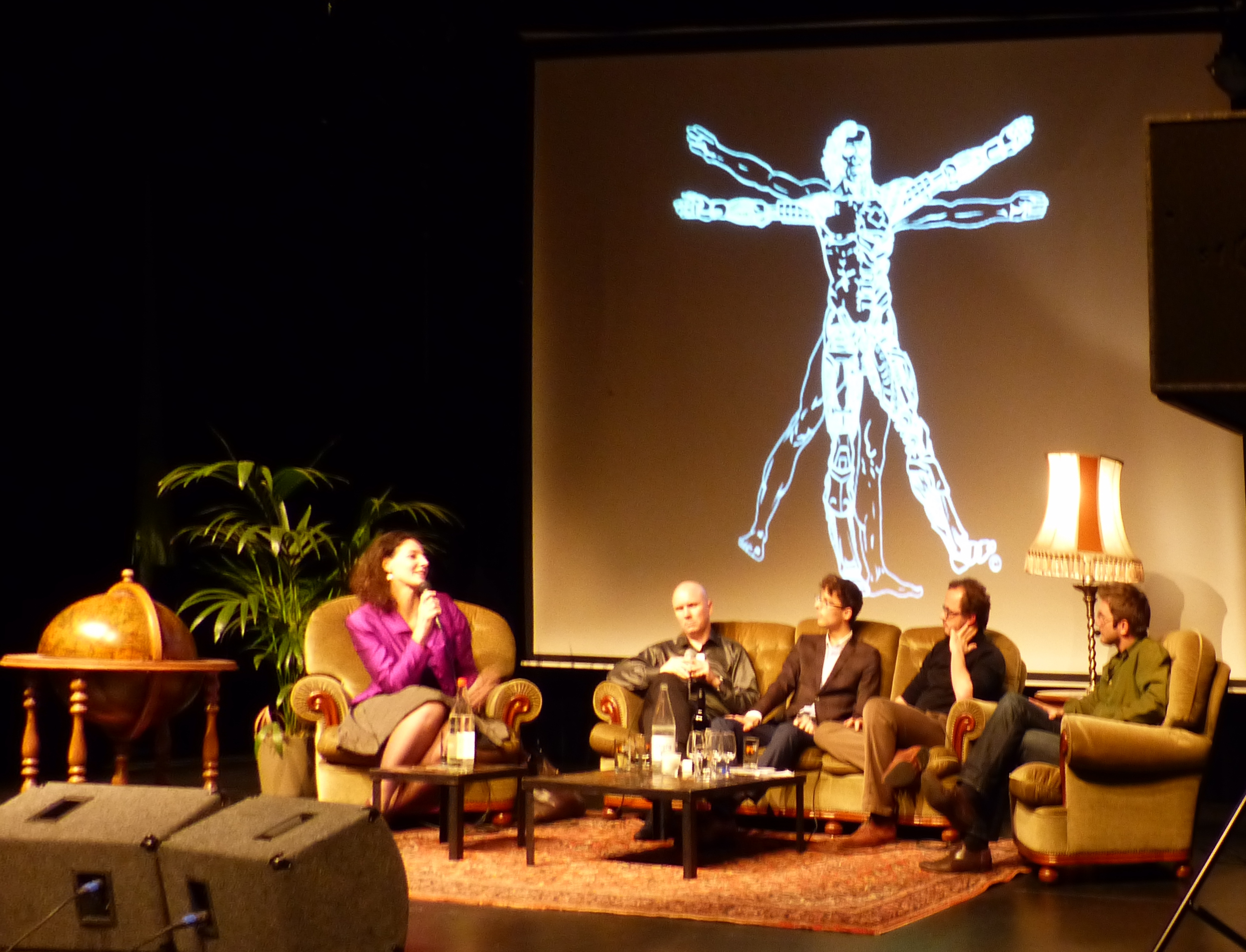
'Van aap tot robot' panel

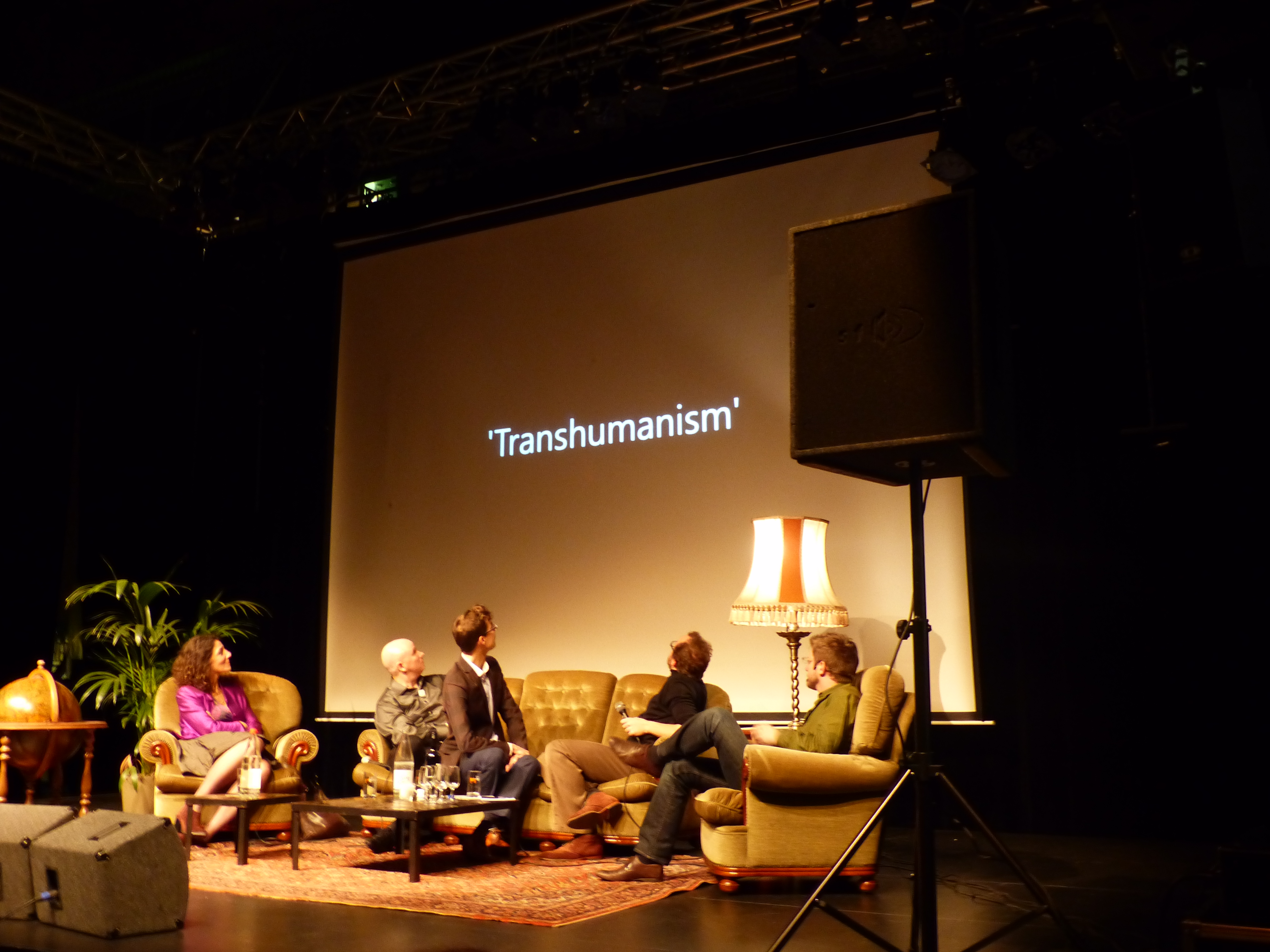
Discussion on transhumanism

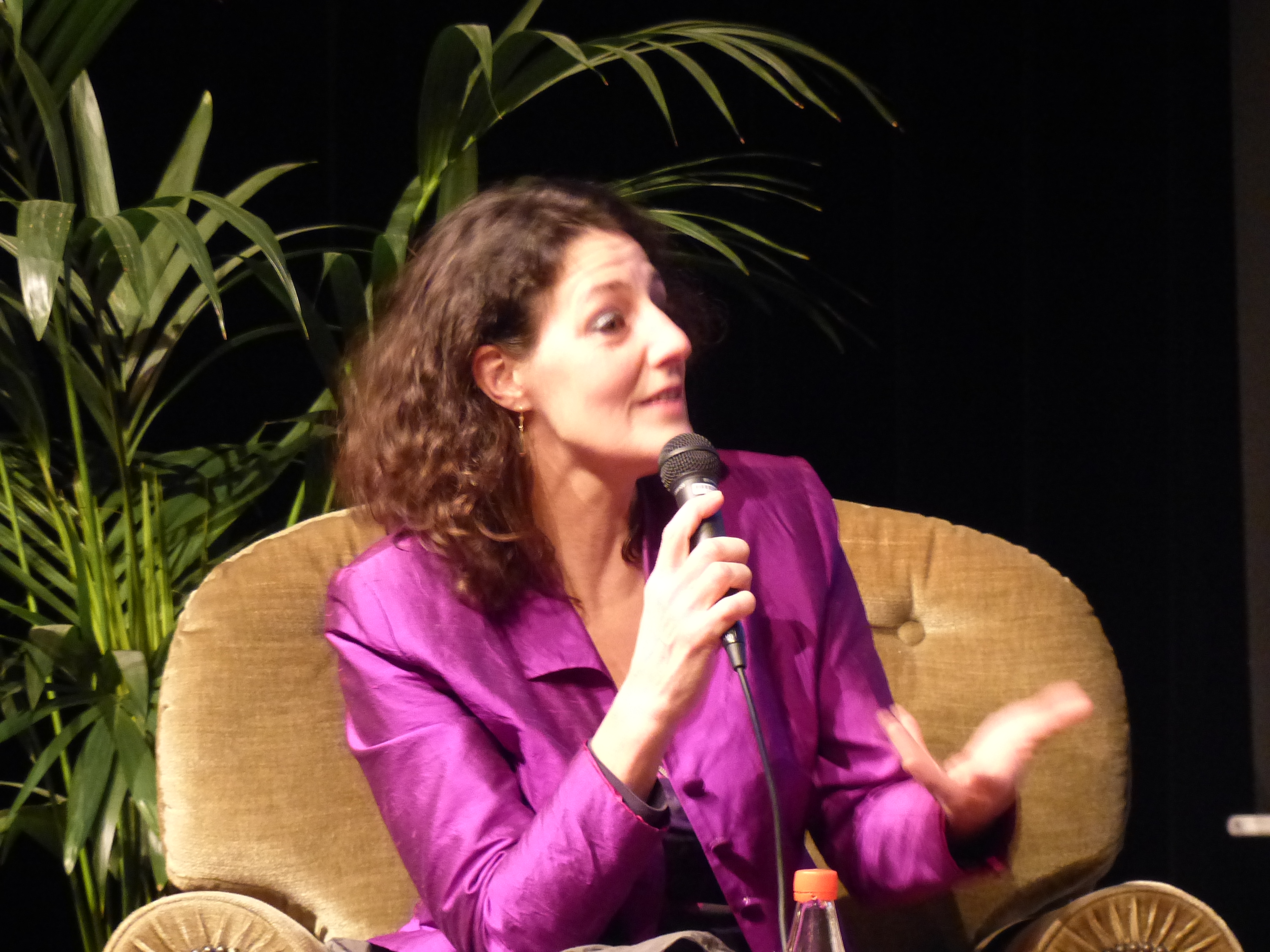
Martijntje Smits

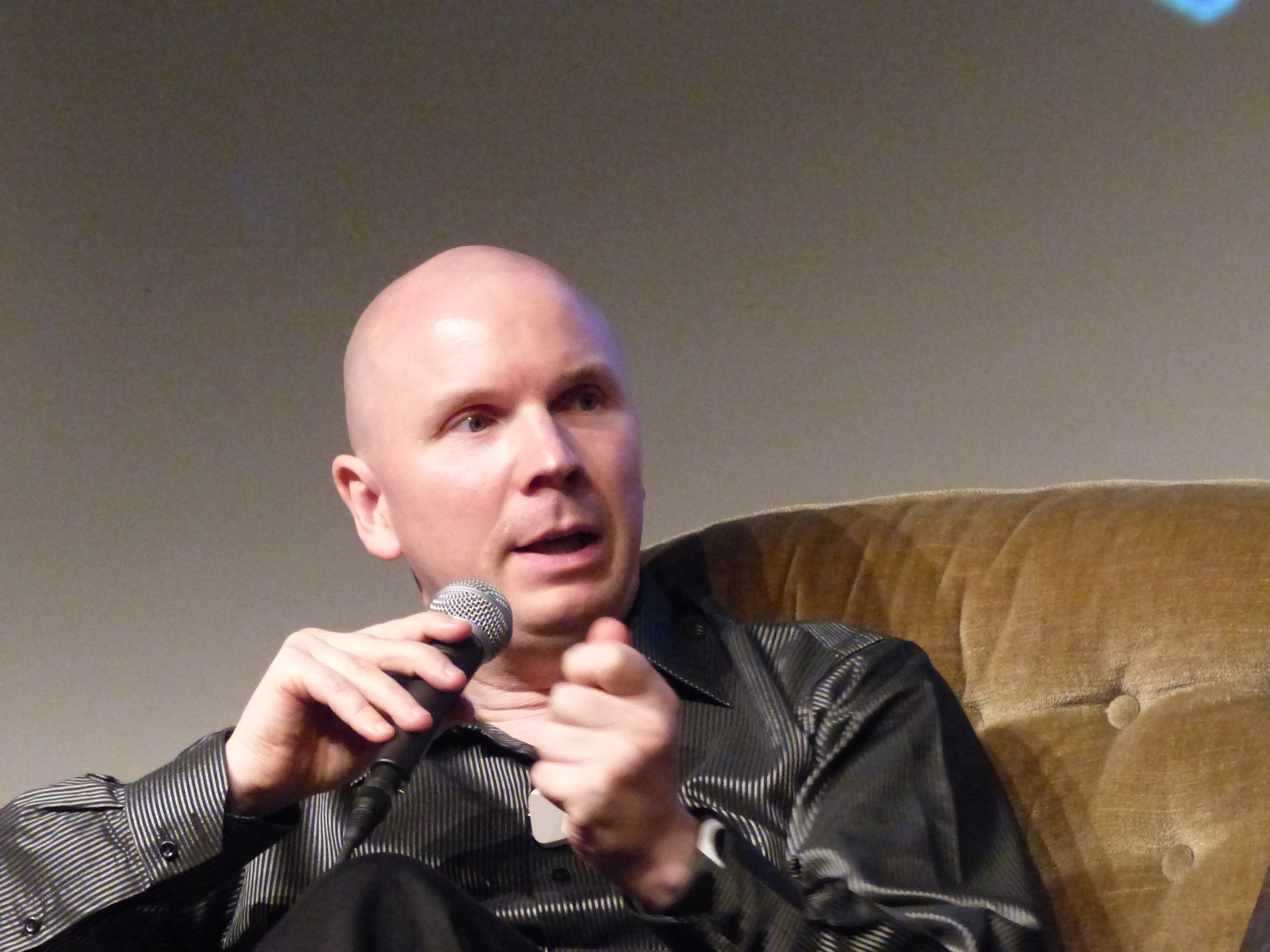
Philippe van Nedervelde

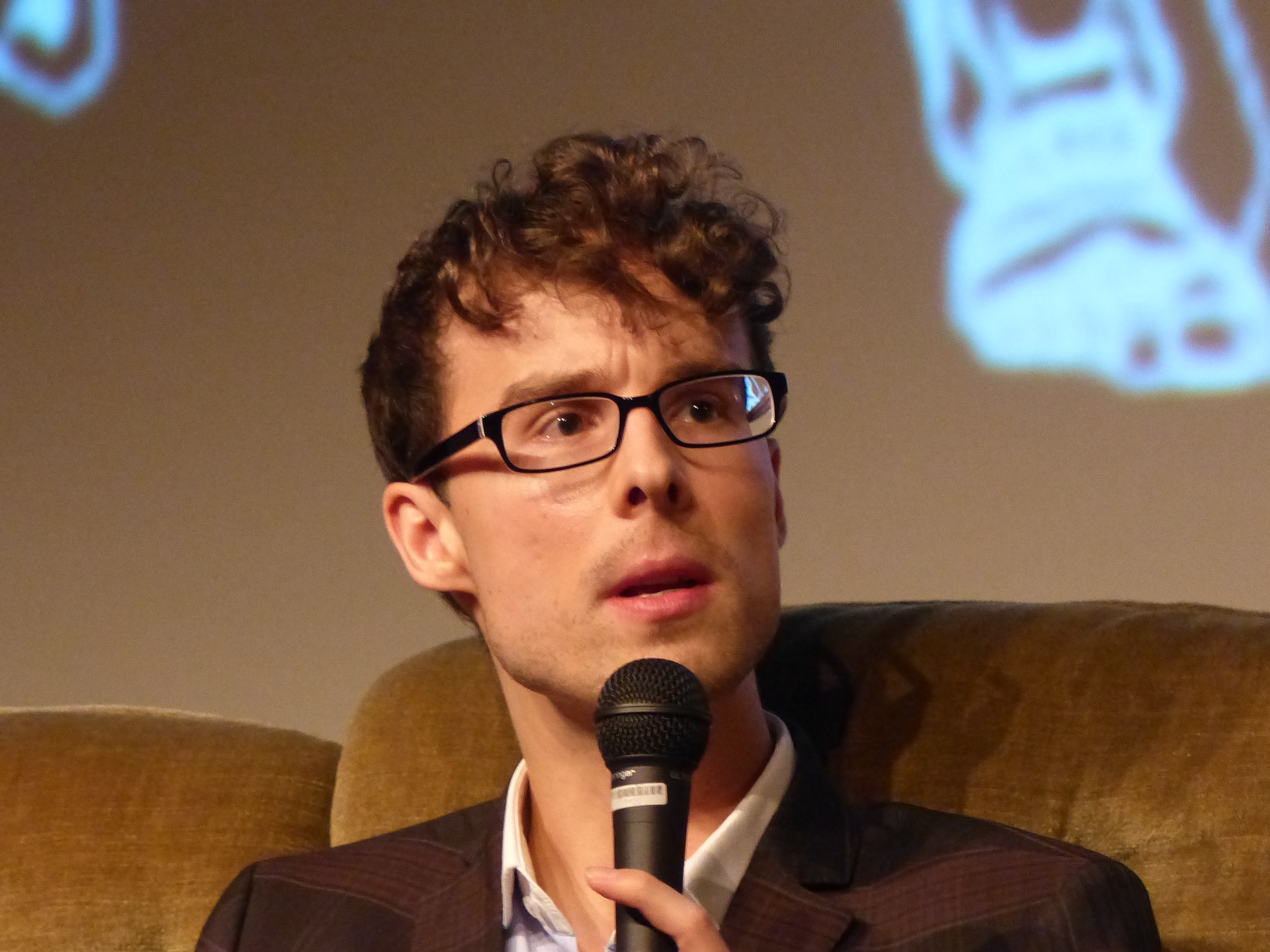
Kris Verburg

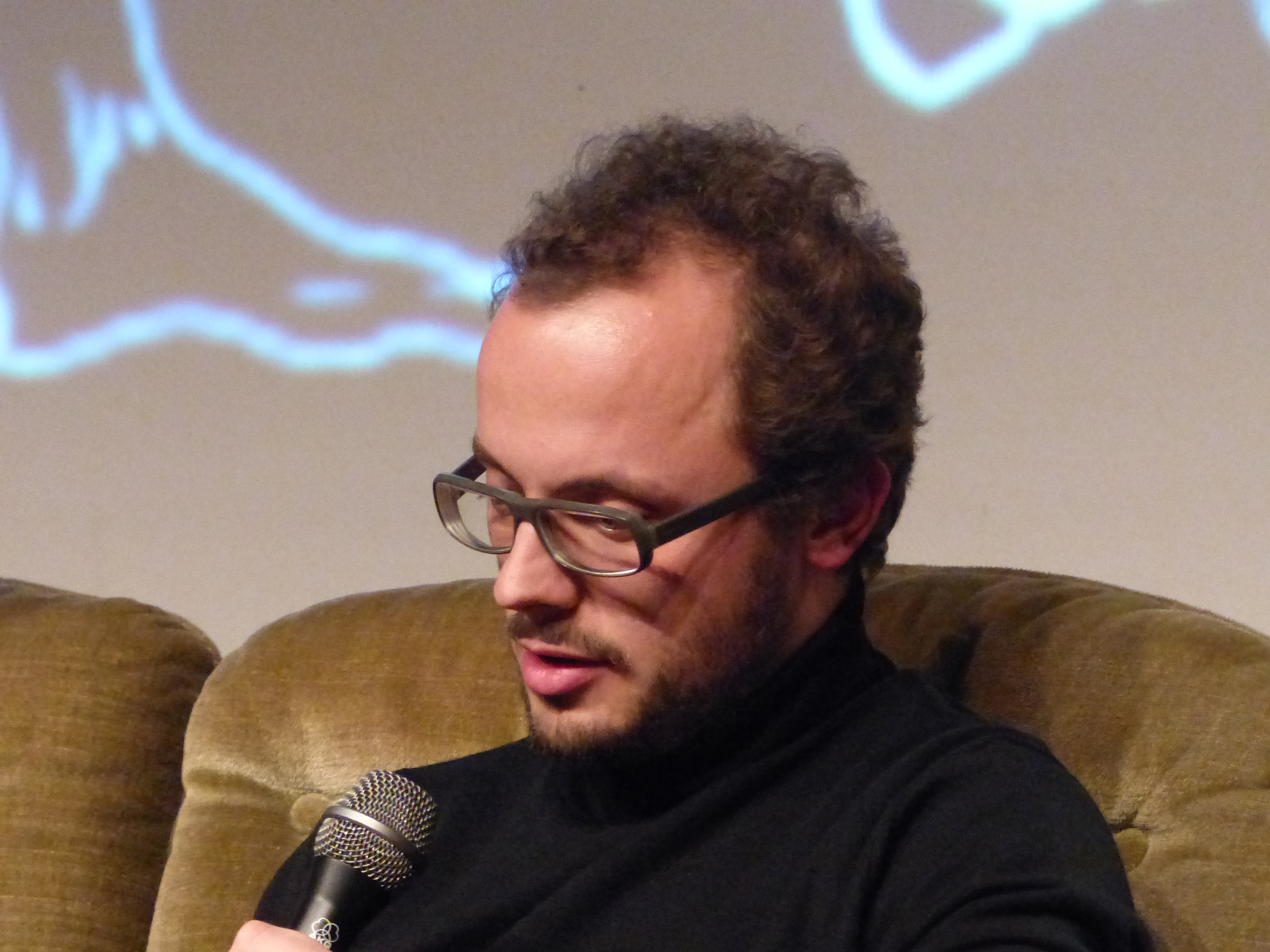
Pieter Bonte

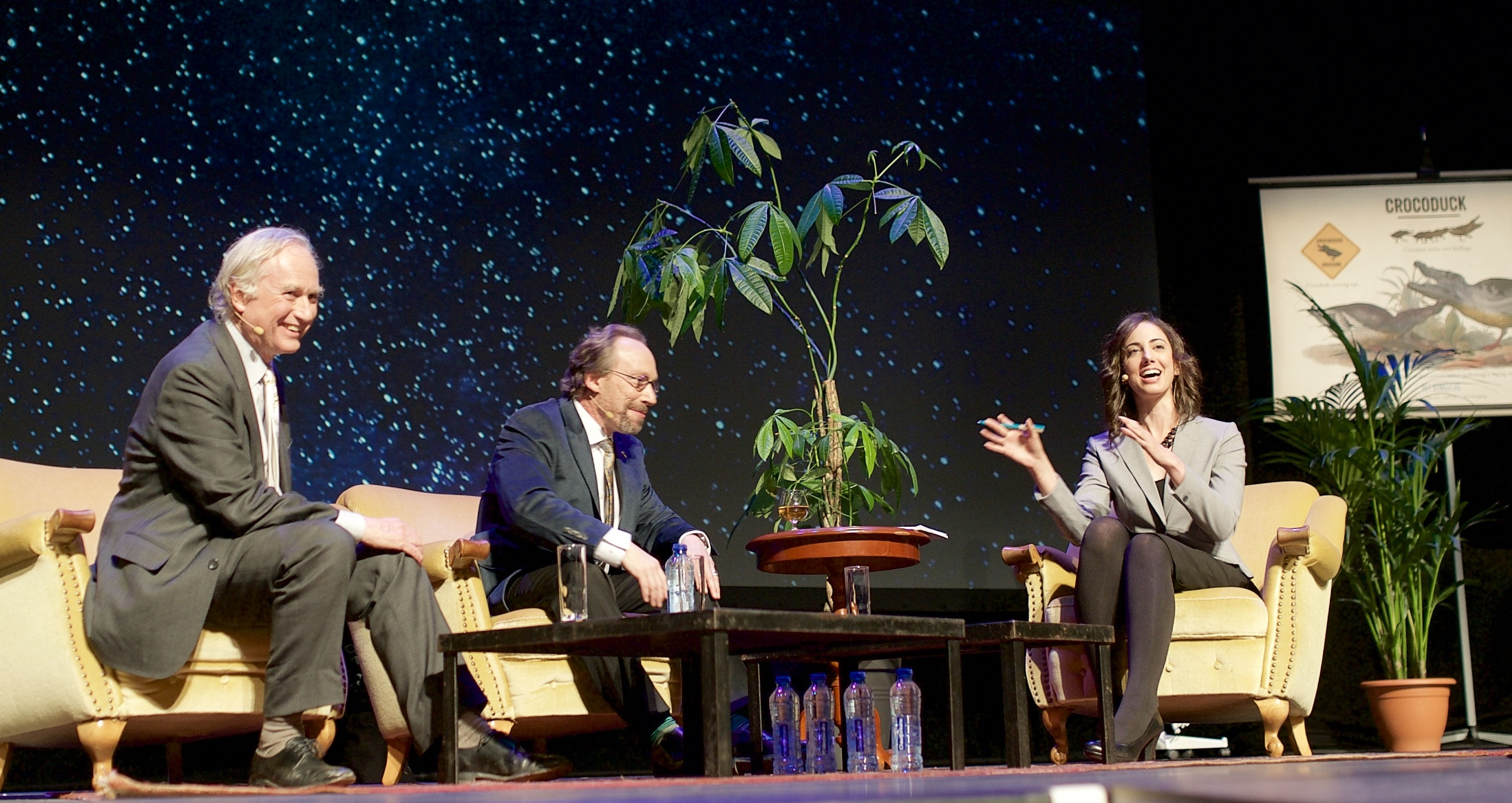
Richard Dawkins, Lawrence Krauss and Julia Galef in 2015

== See also ==
- Comité Para
- List of skeptical organizations
