= Rik Peels =

Dutch philosopher and theologian

- Peels in 2025
- Born: Henric David Peels; 16 February 1983 (age 43); Zoetermeer, Netherlands
- Awards: ERC Starting Grant (2019); Ammodo Science Award (2025)

Academic background
- Education: Theological University of Apeldoorn (BA); Vrije Universiteit Amsterdam (MA Theology, MA Philosophy); Utrecht University (PhD, 2012)
- Thesis: Believing Responsibly: Intellectual Obligations and Doxastic Excuses (2012)
- Doctoral advisor: Herman Philipse; Ralph Wedgwood

Academic work
- Discipline: Philosophy, theology
- Sub-discipline: Philosophy of religion, epistemology, radicalization studies
- Institutions: Vrije Universiteit Amsterdam
- Website: extremebeliefs.com

Henric David "Rik" Peels (born 16 February 1983) is a Dutch philosopher and theologian. Since 2023 he has been professor of analytic and interdisciplinary philosophy of religion at the Vrije Universiteit Amsterdam (VU), holding a University Research Chair. Much of his earlier work is on the ethics of belief and on ignorance, and he has written critically about scientism. His 2017 book Responsible Belief was the subject of book symposia in two philosophy journals.

Since 2019 his main subject has been how people acquire and maintain extreme beliefs, a project funded by a Starting Grant from the European Research Council. He is series editor of Extreme Belief and Behavior at Oxford University Press. Peels received the Ammodo Science Award in 2025 and was elected to the Royal Holland Society of Sciences and Humanities the same year.

== Early life and education ==
Peels was born in Zoetermeer. His father is the Old Testament scholar Eric Peels. He took a bachelor's degree in theology at the Theological University of Apeldoorn and went on to study philosophy at the VU, spending 2004–05 as a visiting graduate student at the University of Notre Dame. At the VU he then completed master's degrees in theology and in philosophy, both cum laude.

He began doctoral research in philosophy at Utrecht University in 2008, and in 2011 he was a research associate at Merton College, Oxford. On 2 March 2012 he defended his PhD thesis at Utrecht University, Believing Responsibly: Intellectual Obligations and Doxastic Excuses. Herman Philipse supervised the work, with Ralph Wedgwood as co-supervisor. The thesis develops a theory of what it is to believe responsibly and explores when ignorance counts as an excuse.

== Career ==
In 2007 Peels became chair of the advisory board of the Veritas Forum, a Christian academic network that organises discussions on the big questions of life at universities. He was appointed its European director in 2012. From 2012 he was a postdoctoral researcher at the VU, working on a common-sense philosophical alternative to scientism in a project funded by the Templeton World Charity Foundation. Together with René van Woudenberg and Jeroen de Ridder he received funding from the same foundation in 2016 and 2019 for two further projects, on the epistemic responsibilities of the university and on epistemic progress in the university respectively. At the VU he leads the research group Strong Religion and Extreme Beliefs. He was a member of the Amsterdam Young Academy from 2018 to 2022 and chaired it in 2019 and 2020.

The European Research Council awarded him a Starting Grant in 2019 for the project Extreme Beliefs: The Epistemology and Ethics of Fundamentalism. It ran from 2020 until the end of 2024 with an EU contribution of just under €1.5 million. On 1 September 2023 he took up a University Research Chair in analytic and interdisciplinary philosophy of religion. At the time of the appointment he worked in the Faculty of Religion and Theology while keeping his link with the Faculty of Humanities. Also in 2023 he became a research associate of the African Centre for Epistemology and Philosophy of Science at the University of Johannesburg. His VU position now falls under the Faculty of Social Sciences and Humanities, and since 2025 the university has also described him as professor in the philosophy and theology of radicalisation. He gave his inaugural lecture, De extremist en de wetenschapper ("The extremist and the scientist"), on 26 January 2024, the day his book of the same title was published.

In March 2024 a consortium of researchers from five Dutch universities, led by the historian Beatrice de Graaf, received a €23 million Gravitation grant from the Dutch Research Council (NWO) for Adapt!, a research programme on how societies can better adapt to crises. Peels is one of its principal investigators. He became a member of the Royal Holland Society of Sciences and Humanities in 2025.

== Research ==
=== Ethics of belief and ignorance ===
The ethics of belief runs through much of Peels's work. In Responsible Belief (2017) he argues that people cannot simply choose what to believe. What they can do is influence their beliefs through what they do and fail to do, and that is where, on his account, their responsibility lies. In 2018 the journals Teorema and the International Journal of Philosophical Studies each ran a book symposium on it, with papers by several philosophers and a reply from Peels.

Ignorance is his second long-standing topic. He edited two collections on it, the first with Martijn Blaauw, which appeared in 2016 and 2017. His monograph Ignorance: A Philosophical Study followed in 2023 and was reviewed in Notre Dame Philosophical Reviews and the International Journal for the Study of Skepticism, among other places. In 2025 Philosophical Issues, a supplement to Noûs, devoted a symposium to the book, with contributions by Duncan Pritchard and Christopher Willard-Kyle and replies by Peels.

=== Scientism and common sense ===
Peels has criticised scientism, the view that only the natural sciences produce reliable knowledge. With Jeroen de Ridder and René van Woudenberg he edited Scientism: Prospects and Problems (2018). He and Van Woudenberg then edited The Cambridge Companion to Common-Sense Philosophy (2020), on the philosophy of common sense. A Philosophy of the Humanities (2025), written with Stephen Grimm and Van Woudenberg, deals with how the humanities produce knowledge.

=== Philosophy of religion ===
With the theologian Stefan Paas, Peels wrote God bewijzen ("Proving God", 2013), a book on the arguments for and against belief in God. In January 2014 the two authors debated it at Felix Meritis in Amsterdam with Herman Philipse and Maarten Boudry. That June the book shared the prize for best theological book at the Nacht van de Theologie (Night of Theology) with De berg van de ziel by Christa Anbeek and Ada de Jong.

Life without God (2023) asks why people become atheists. It argues that most atheists are not primarily driven by arguments for atheism. It was reviewed in Reviews in Religion & Theology, among others. The Dutch edition, Leven zonder God (2024), was reviewed in Trouw, the Nederlands Dagblad and the Reformatorisch Dagblad.

Monotheism and Fundamentalism (2024) deals with the relation between monotheism and fundamentalism. Peels argues that there is no empirical evidence to think that faith in one God generally or often leads to fundamentalism. Fundamentalists can and do instrumentalise certain religious texts for their own purposes, he argues, but monotheistic religions also have enough resources to make monotheists resilient to fundamentalism.

=== Extremism and radicalisation ===
Since 2019 Peels has worked mainly on extreme beliefs, from religious fundamentalism to belief in conspiracy theories. His ERC project started from the assumption that a fundamentalist is usually an ordinary and relatively rational person who is, as a rule, responsible for his harmful views. For Peels, fundamentalism lies less in the content of a belief than in the way a person holds it. It is therefore not confined to religion and also occurs in right-wing and left-wing extremism. Socio-economic explanations are useful but incomplete in his view. How people think matters as well, including their intellectual virtues and vices, and so does their religiosity. His 2025 article in Terrorism and Political Violence on the relation between cognitive and behavioural radicalisation drew responses in the same journal from Clark McCauley and Sophia Moskalenko and from James Khalil, to which he replied.

In his inaugural lecture and the accompanying Dutch book he made the case for bringing resources from philosophy and theology to the study of radicalisation, and for engaging with extremists in conversation. Theologians should have a larger part in that debate, he argues, because the religious motives of terrorists cannot be explained away. He defines extremism as the belief that one's own group can only flourish in hostility towards another group. Extremists, in his view, are not mad; they act with instrumental rationality. Much research on radicalisation, he says, describes more than it explains. The citation for his Ammodo Science Award mentions his use of the concept of non-ideal rationality to explain how apparently rational people arrive at extreme beliefs.

Peels is the series editor of Extreme Belief and Behavior at Oxford University Press. For the series he edited Conceptualizing Extreme Beliefs and Behaviors (2025, with John Horgan), Explaining Extreme Belief and Behavior (2026, with Lorne L. Dawson) and Responsibility for Extreme Beliefs and Behaviors (2026, with Naomi Kloosterboer and Chris Ranalli). In 2023 he co-wrote a report for the Research and Documentation Centre (WODC) of the Dutch government on how public bodies arrive at ideological assessments and how sound those assessments are.

=== Replication in the humanities ===
Peels has argued that research in the empirical humanities should also be replicated, to test whether its findings hold up. He made the case with Lex Bouter in Nature and Palgrave Communications in 2018. A debate followed with scholars who see little point in replication in the humanities. With the art historian Charlotte Rulkens and others he then repeated a study on the attribution of two portraits to Rembrandt, work for which the team received the OSCAward for Open Science in 2024.

== Awards and honours ==
- 2014: prize for the best theological book at the Nacht van de Theologie, for God bewijzen (with Stefan Paas)
- 2019: ERC Starting Grant
- 2021: grant from the Gewaardeerd! fund of the Royal Netherlands Academy of Arts and Sciences (KNAW) for science communication on science scepticism and religion, with Gijsbert van den Brink, Stefan Paas, Eva van Urk-Coster and Arie Zwiep
- 2024: NWO Gravitation grant for the Adapt! programme, with Beatrice de Graaf and others
- 2024: OSCAward for Open Science for the replication of a Rembrandt study, with Charlotte Rulkens, Lex Bouter and Maartje Stols-Witlox
- 2025: Ammodo Science Award in the humanities, worth €350,000, presented on 7 May 2025 at the Rijksmuseum
- 2025: member of the Royal Holland Society of Sciences and Humanities

== Public engagement ==
Peels at a debate on religion in 2014

Peels writes opinion pieces for Dutch newspapers including Trouw, NRC, de Volkskrant and the Nederlands Dagblad. In 2019 he published an op-ed in de Volkskrant defending funding for the humanities. A year later he wrote in the same newspaper that needless insult is immoral but need not be banned by law. In 2025 and 2026 he was one of eight researchers who took turns writing for Trouw's series Klaar voor de crisis ("Ready for the crisis"). With Beatrice de Graaf he wrote a series in NRC on the seven classical virtues; their book De zeven deugden ("The seven virtues") has been announced for January 2027 by the publisher Prometheus. In September 2026 he argued in NRC that the greatest threat to the democratic constitutional state comes from within, and called for what he terms waardenweerbaarheid, resilience in values. With Jeroen de Ridder he wrote Wat is nou waar? ("So what is true?", 2025), which sets out seven rules for clear thinking in a time of disinformation.

In 2024 he contributed to The Long History of... Ignorance, a six-part series by Rory Stewart on BBC Radio 4 that was also released as a podcast. On 17 September 2025 he appeared as one of the witnesses in the Radio 4 debate programme Moral Maze, in an episode titled "To know or not to know?". On Dutch radio he has been a guest on NPO Radio 1 programmes such as Villa VdB and Nieuwsweekend. He talked with Annemiek Schrijver about Wat is nou waar? and other subjects in the KRO-NCRV programme De verwondering, broadcast on NPO 2 on 28 December 2025. He has appeared several times on De Ongelooflijke Podcast, once alongside the atheist philosopher Stine Jensen. He was the keynote speaker at the Nacht van de Theologie in 2024. At the VU's anniversary celebration (dies natalis) on 20 November 2025 he spoke about free and respectful debate on sensitive subjects at the university.

== Selected publications ==
=== Books ===
- Responsible Belief: A Theory in Ethics and Epistemology. Oxford University Press, 2017. ISBN 9780190608118
- Ignorance: A Philosophical Study. Oxford University Press, 2023. ISBN 9780197654514
- Life without God: An Outsider's Look at Atheism. Cambridge University Press, 2023. ISBN 9781009297790
- Monotheism and Fundamentalism: Prevalence, Potential, and Resilience. Cambridge University Press, 2024. ISBN 9781009309646
- A Philosophy of the Humanities (with Stephen Grimm and René van Woudenberg). Oxford University Press, 2025. ISBN 9780197749609
- God bewijzen: Argumenten voor en tegen geloven (with Stefan Paas). Balans, 2013. ISBN 9789460037245 (in Dutch)
- De extremist en de wetenschapper: Hoe we radicalisering beter kunnen begrijpen. Balans, 2024. ISBN 9789463823418 (in Dutch)
- Leven zonder God: Wat je kunt leren van atheïsten. KokBoekencentrum, 2024. ISBN 9789043540896 (in Dutch)
- Wat is nou waar? Zeven regels om helder te denken in verwarrende tijden (with Jeroen de Ridder). Balans, 2025. ISBN 9789463822688 (in Dutch)
- Fundamentalism. Dialogos, 2025. ISBN 9789175044446 (in Swedish)

=== Edited volumes ===
- The Epistemic Dimensions of Ignorance (with Martijn Blaauw). Cambridge University Press, 2016. ISBN 9781107175600
- Perspectives on Ignorance from Moral and Social Philosophy. Routledge, 2017. ISBN 9781138945661
- New Developments in the Cognitive Science of Religion: The Rationality of Religious Belief (with Hans van Eyghen and Gijsbert van den Brink). Springer, 2018. ISBN 9783319902388
- Scientism: Prospects and Problems (with Jeroen de Ridder and René van Woudenberg). Oxford University Press, 2018. ISBN 9780190462758
- En God zag dat het goed was: Christelijk geloof en evolutie in 25 cruciale vragen (with William den Boer and René Fransen). Summum, 2019. ISBN 9789492701060 (in Dutch)
- The Cambridge Companion to Common-Sense Philosophy (with René van Woudenberg). Cambridge University Press, 2020. ISBN 9781108476003
- Scientific Challenges to Common Sense Philosophy (with Jeroen de Ridder and René van Woudenberg). Routledge, 2020. ISBN 9781138479982
- Progress in Theology: Does the Queen of the Sciences Advance? (with Gijsbert van den Brink and Bethany Sollereder). Routledge, 2024. ISBN 9781032646732
- Conceptualizing Extreme Beliefs and Behaviors: Definitions and Relations (with John Horgan). Oxford University Press, 2025. ISBN 9780197760192
- Denken voor het leven: Feestbundel voor René van Woudenberg (with Jeroen de Ridder and Dorien Sorel). Eburon, 2025. ISBN 9789463015530 (in Dutch)
- Explaining Extreme Belief and Behavior: Theoretical, Methodological, and Ethical Challenges (with Lorne Dawson). Oxford University Press, 2026. ISBN 9780197768884
- Responsibility for Extreme Beliefs and Behaviors: Individual, Group, and Structural Factors (with Naomi Kloosterboer and Chris Ranalli). Oxford University Press, 2026. ISBN 9780197817186

=== Selected articles ===
- "What Is Ignorance?". Philosophia 38 (2010). doi:10.1007/s11406-009-9202-8
- "Why Responsible Belief Is Blameless Belief" (with Anthony Booth). The Journal of Philosophy 107, no. 5 (2010). doi:10.5840/jphil2010107519
- "Against Doxastic Compatibilism". Philosophy and Phenomenological Research 89, no. 3 (2014). doi:10.1111/phpr.12040
- "What Kind of Ignorance Excuses? Two Neglected Issues". The Philosophical Quarterly 64 (2014). doi:10.1093/pq/pqu013
- "Responsible Belief and Epistemic Justification". Synthese 194 (2017). doi:10.1007/s11229-016-1038-8
- "Humanities need a replication drive too" (with Lex Bouter). Nature 558 (2018). doi:10.1038/d41586-018-05454-w
- "The possibility and desirability of replication in the humanities" (with Lex Bouter). Palgrave Communications 4 (2018). doi:10.1057/s41599-018-0149-x
- "On Defining 'Fundamentalism'". Religious Studies 59 (2023). doi:10.1017/S0034412522000683
- "What Is It to Explain Extremism?". Terrorism and Political Violence (2023). doi:10.1080/09546553.2023.2255902
- "Towards a Fruitful Concept of Radicalisation: A Synthesis". Journal of Contemporary European Studies 32, no. 3 (2024). doi:10.1080/14782804.2023.2185594
- "Cognitive and Behavioral Radicalization: An Explanatory Split?". Terrorism and Political Violence 38, no. 7 (2026): 840–854. doi:10.1080/09546553.2025.2502860
- "Explaining Terrorism in Terms of INUS Conditions". Perspectives on Terrorism 20, no. 2 (2026). doi:10.19165/wvrg4107
