= Smedes =

Smedes is a surname. Notable people with the surname include:

- Lewis B. Smedes (1921–2002), American Christian author, ethicist, and theologian
- Susan Dabney Smedes (1840–1913), American teacher, news correspondent, and author
- Taede A. Smedes (born 1973), Dutch philosopher of religion
