= The Scout Mindset =

2021 nonfiction book by Julia Galef

The Scout Mindset: Why Some People See Things Clearly and Others Don't
- Author: Julia Galef
- Language: English
- Subject: Cognitive psychology, critical thinking, decision-making
- Publisher: Portfolio (US); Piatkus (UK)
- Publication date: April 13, 2021
- Publication place: United States
- Pages: 288
- ISBN: 9780735217553
- OCLC: 1164823768
- Dewey Decimal: 153.4
- LC Class: BF311.G266 2021

The Scout Mindset: Why Some People See Things Clearly and Others Don't is a 2021 non-fiction book by Julia Galef.

In the book, Galef argues for what she calls a scout mindset: "the motivation to see things as they are, not as you wish they were". The scout mindset emphasizes curiosity, unbiased truth-seeking, and facing reality, even if that reality is unexpected. Galef contrasts this with a "soldier mindset", which she says is a natural tendency to use motivated reasoning to defend one's existing beliefs instead of being open to changing them.

== Background ==
In 2012, Galef co-founded the Center for Applied Rationality, an organization focused on educating people about rationality and cognitive bias. But in 2016 she left the organization, feeling that her work there was not accomplishing as much as she wanted, and started writing The Scout Mindset. She worked on the book for five years before it was published, because she wanted it to be supported by evidence, and because her views on the topic changed while researching and writing about it. The book was published on April 13, 2021, by Portfolio, a division of Penguin.

== Summary ==
The book is divided into five parts, with an introduction and a conclusion.

Part I, "The Case for Scout Mindset", describes the "scout mindset", a style of thinking that is focused on earnestly seeking the truth, and contrasts it with the "soldier mindset", a style of thinking that is focused on defending one's existing beliefs. Galef lists several benefits of the soldier mindset, but argues that people tend to systematically underestimate the value of the scout mindset.

Part II, "Developing Self-Awareness", discusses ways to examine one's own mindset. Galef gives examples of what does and does not indicate a scout mindset, suggests ways to notice and counteract bias, and outlines strategies for quantifying and labeling levels of confidence.

Part III, "Thriving Without Illusions", argues that the supposed benefits of overconfidence and self-deception are not convincing reasons to shy away from a scout mindset. Galef says that self-deception is sometimes seen as valuable for staying happy, coping with difficult situations, motivating oneself, or influencing others, but she argues that there are effective ways to accomplish these goals without sacrificing good judgement.

In Part IV, "Changing Your Mind", Galef outlines strategies for making it easier to change one's mind. She advises reacting to evidence that one is wrong by updating one's beliefs rather than seeing the incorrect belief as a failure. She recommends paying attention to things that are confusing or don't seem to make sense, as they may be evidence of mistaken assumptions. And she gives suggestions on how to engage productively with differing viewpoints.

Part V, "Rethinking Identity", focuses on how beliefs are related to identity. Galef examines how and why people form identities around their beliefs and says that when a belief is part of someone's identity, it becomes harder for that belief to change. She suggests limiting how much an ideology or movement becomes part of one's identity, and argues that, counterintuitively, "holding your identity lightly" can be helpful for activism. She also gives reasons to adopt the scout mindset itself as part of one's identity.

=== Examples ===
The book discusses examples to illustrate the scout mindset, including:

- Jeff Bezos and Elon Musk, successful entrepreneurs who Galef says were not overconfident about their chances of success when starting out.
- Steven Callahan, a sailor who survived weeks at sea on a liferaft through careful decision-making and avoiding self-deception.
- Georges Picquart, a military official who, in spite of personal prejudice and external pressure, worked to find evidence that exonerated Alfred Dreyfus after the latter was wrongly convicted in the Dreyfus affair.

Galef describes the Star Trek character Mr. Spock as a contrast to the scout mindset. According to Galef, Spock is much less rational than he claims to be: he reasons poorly about other people's behavior when he believes their decisions are illogical, and he is bad at forecasting. Based on Galef's exhaustive cataloging, the character's predictions about the future are frequently inaccurate, and the more confidence he expresses, the more likely he is to be wrong.

=== Psychological basis ===
The book's conceptual framework has a basis in psychological research. Research indicates that the soldier mindset is the default human mode of reasoning in high-stakes situations, while the scout mindset bears similarities to "actively open-minded thinking" as described by the psychologist Jonathan Baron.

== Reception ==
The book and the mindset it advocates have been praised. Stephen L. Carter of Bloomberg News said the book was "fully deserving of the acclaim it's received", while Tim Harford of the Financial Times mentioned it as one of several good books about disagreement. Ryan Young of the Competitive Enterprise Institute called it "highly readable" and said the best part of its advice was to regularly practice thinking with a scout mindset.

In a review in The Wall Street Journal, Michael Shermer praised the concept of the scout mindset, saying that it is relevant to understanding why people get things wrong and why they fail to change their minds. He called the book "an engaging and enlightening account from which we all can benefit". The Journal included The Scout Mindset on its list of "12 Books to Start a Smart New Year" for 2022.

The political strategist Dominic Cummings praised the book and suggested that the UK government should ask Galef to help with decision-making. Cummings tweeted: "If the 20 most influential people dealing with Covid in UK Government had read/internalised Julia Galef's The Scout Mindset, tens of thousands who died could still be alive."

The philosopher Will MacAskill recommended the book as "a wonderful book for expressing a mode of reasoning that really resonates" with him. Of the mindset the book advocates, MacAskill said, "I don't know if I always achieve that, but it's something I try to aspire towards."

=== In academia ===
The book has also been cited in academia. Benjamin J. Lovett, writing in the journal Psychological Injury and Law, said that the scout and soldier mindsets are "a useful framework for thinking about the role of advocacy and objectivity in psychological practice (and elsewhere)". However, Lovett was not convinced by Galef's claim that the scout mindset makes advocates more effective; he wrote that this is true sometimes but not always.

An article in the Journal of Ecumenical Studies cited Galef's work in an account of why political polarization makes people less receptive to proselytism than they might otherwise be.

== See also ==
- Reactance (psychology)
- Mindset
- Echo chamber (media)
- Rationalism
