= Julia Galef =

American rationality writer and speaker (born 1983)

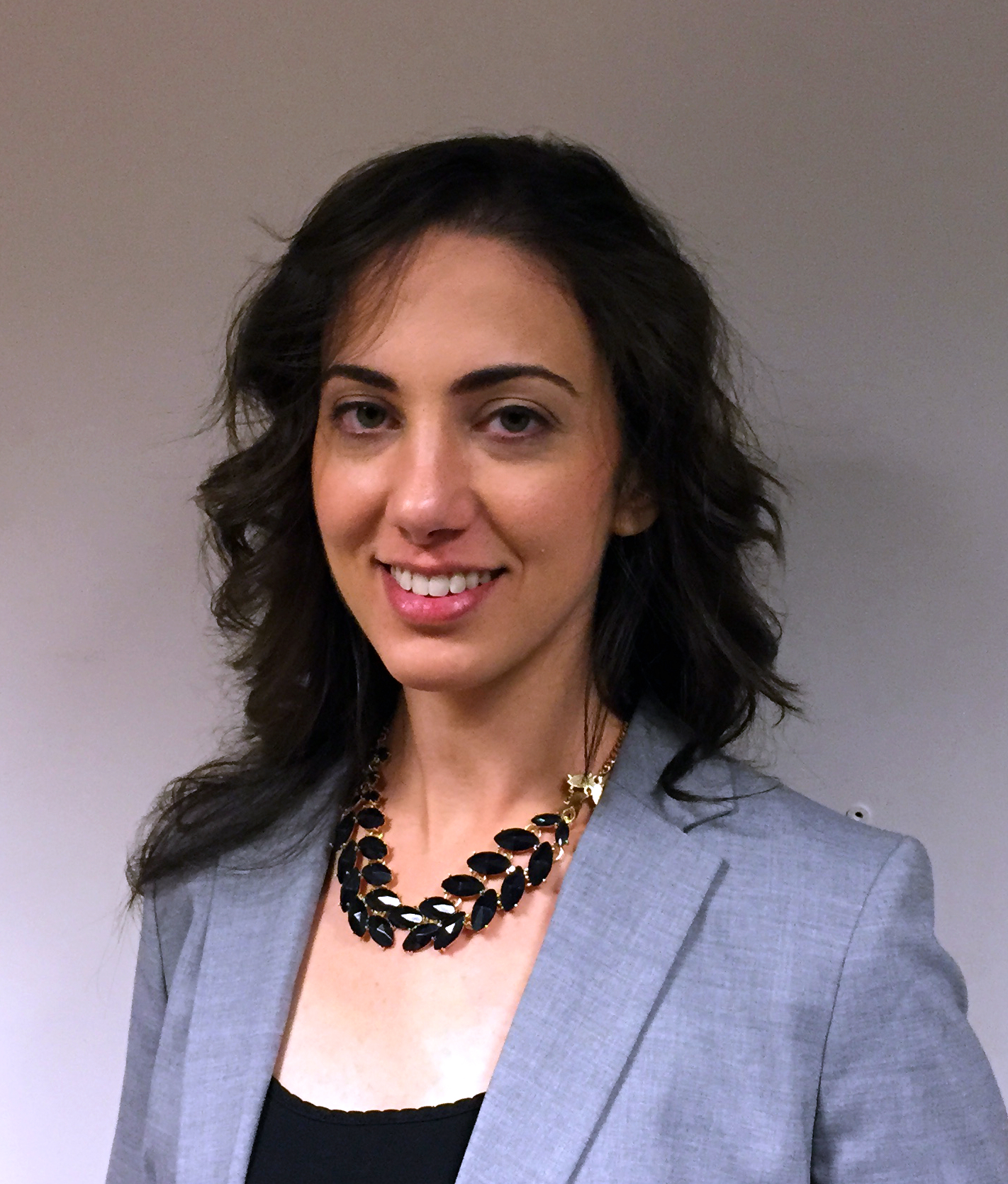
- Galef in 2015
- Born: July 4, 1983 (age 43); Silver Spring, Maryland, U.S.

Education
- Education: Columbia University (BA)

Philosophical work
- Era: Contemporary philosophy
- Region: Western philosophy
- School: Scientific skepticism
- Institutions: Center for Applied Rationality; Committee for Skeptical Inquiry; Rationally Speaking
- Main interests: Philosophy of science, applied rationality
- Website: juliagalef.com

The voice of Julia Galef
recorded January 26, 2015, at Het Denkgelag

Julia Galef (/ˈɡeɪləf/; born July 4, 1983) is an American writer, speaker and co-founder of the Center for Applied Rationality. From 2010 to 2021, she hosted Rationally Speaking, the official podcast of New York City Skeptics, sharing the show with co-host and philosopher Massimo Pigliucci and produced by Benny Pollak until 2015.

== Biography ==
Galef was born in 1983 in Maryland. She received a BA in statistics from Columbia University. In 2010 she joined the board of directors of the New York City Skeptics. She co-founded and became president of the nonprofit Center for Applied Rationality in 2012 after she moved from New York to Berkeley, California. The organization also gives workshops to train people to internalize and use strategies based on the principles of rationality on a more regular basis to improve their reasoning and decision-making skills and achieve goals. She was elected a fellow of the Committee for Skeptical Inquiry in 2015.

In 2021, Galef and her fiancé, blogger Luke Muehlhauser, left their San Francisco studio to work remotely and travel the United States. In April 2021, they were in Franklin, North Carolina, when she was interviewed by Intelligencer over Zoom.

== Popularization of rationality research ==
In 2009, Galef began co-hosting the Rationally Speaking Podcast with the philosopher of science Massimo Pigliucci. Their first episode was released on February 1, 2010. The show has hosted conversations with public intellectuals such as Neil deGrasse Tyson, Lawrence Krauss, James Randi, and Peter Singer.

Galef frequently speaks on rationality and moderates debates at skeptic conferences. She gives public lectures to organizations including the Center for Inquiry and the Secular Student Alliance. From 2010 to 2015, she was a speaker for the Northeast Conference on Science and Skepticism.

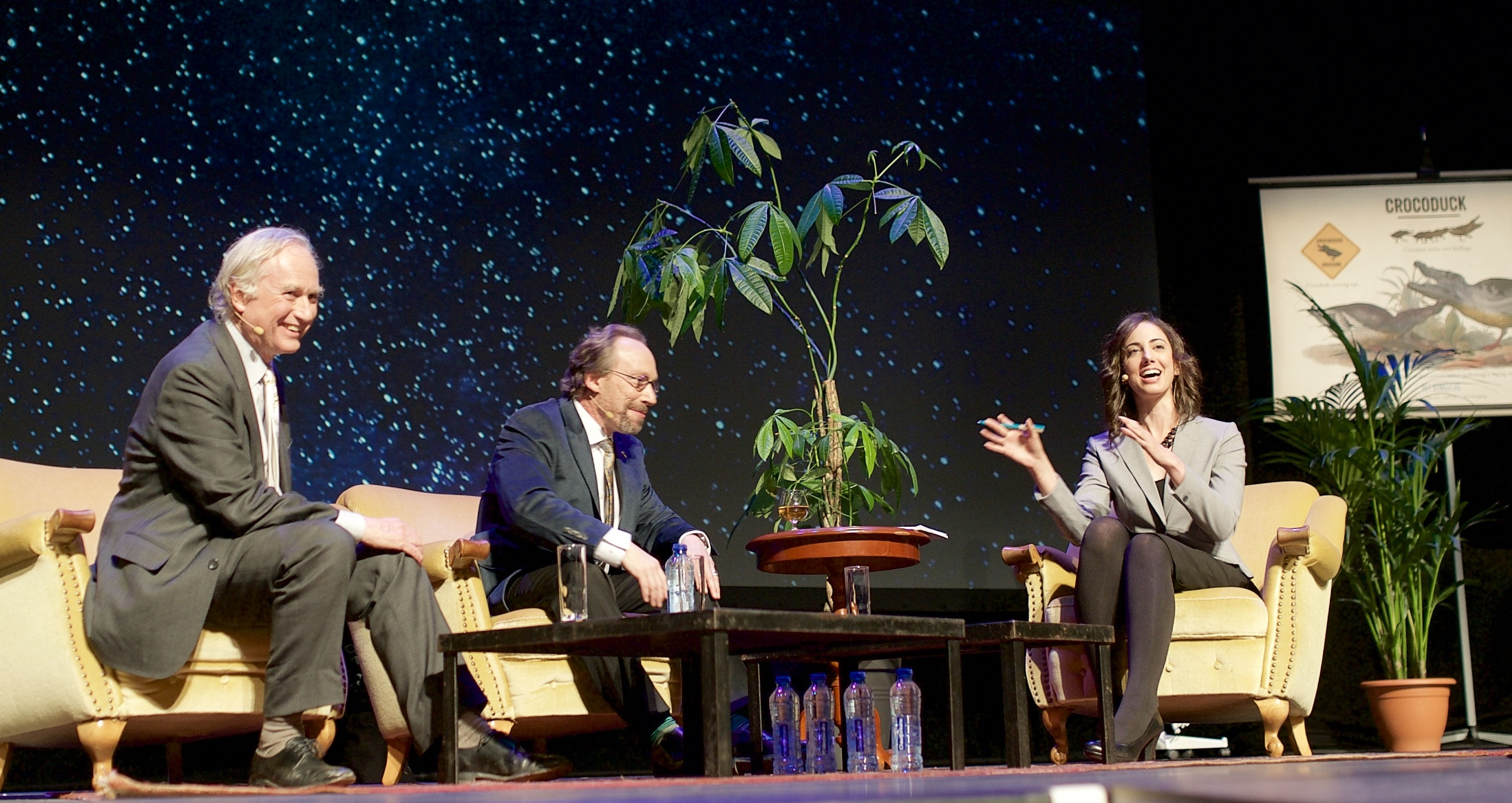
Galef (right) at Het Denkgelag 2015 moderating a conversation between Richard Dawkins and Lawrence Krauss

Galef began writing the blog Measure of Doubt in 2011 with her brother, as well as writing for Religion Dispatches and Scientific American. From April 2015 to December 2021, she was the sole host of the Rationally Speaking podcast. Galef's activities as a writer, podcaster and president of the Center for Applied Rationality are mentioned by The Atlantic, The Verge, and NPR.

In 2014, she wrote several articles and recorded several short videos for Big Think, some of which are part of the Big Think Mentor's workshops. Subsequent to her exposure with Big Think as an expert on the topic of rationality, she was interviewed in 2014 by Forbes, Fast Company, and The Wall Street Journal. In particular her idea of keeping a "surprise journal" received attention, which is one of the techniques Galef uses to record incidents where her expectations were wrong, in order to recognize personal faulty assumptions that expose and counterweight the "bias blind spot". According to Galef, it can be easier to adjust internalized beliefs by framing the new evidence as a surprise.

In February 2016, Galef delivered a TED talk on, "Why you think you're right—even if you're wrong", encouraging critical self-skepticism and prioritizing coming to the correct viewpoint using "scout mindset" instead of working to ensure your current viewpoint is seen as correct with a "soldier mindset". The talk was covered by National Public Radio's TED Radio Hour in November 2016.

In 2021, her first book The Scout Mindset: Why Some People See Things Clearly and Others Don't was published by Penguin. Galef had left the Center for Applied Rationality in 2016 to focus on writing.

On 23 December 2021, she hosted the last episode of Rationally Speaking, "263: Is cash the best way to help the poor?", with economist Michael Faye as a guest.

== Ideas on rationality ==
Julia Galef often explains common confusions and popular misconceptions of rationality. Frequently she distinguishes Richard Foley's concept of "epistemic rationality" from Max Weber's "instrumental rationality". She describes epistemic rationality as a way of reasoning according to logic and the principles of probability theory to form beliefs and conclusions. In contrast, she describes instrumental rationality as a decision-making process in which people choose the action that maximizes their expected utility, whatever their goals are.

Galef discussed the concept of Straw Vulcan, originally coined by the website TV Tropes, to describe the incorrect perception about rationality as a way of thinking that denies emotions such as love and lacks appreciations for beauty. It refers to the fictional character Spock (a half-Vulcan) in Star Trek, who is often seen to exemplify this caricature of rationality. Galef argues that, given the gross irrationality Spock has seen in humans, his failure to adjust his expectations about humans' ability to make rational decisions is itself a case of irrationality.
