= Eric Peels =

- Born: 25 May 1956 (age 70); Dordrecht, Netherlands
- Education: Theological University of Apeldoorn
- Occupation: Theologian
- Theological work
- Tradition or movement: Reformed Christianity

Hendrik George Laurens (Eric) Peels (born 25 May 1956) is a Dutch minister, theologian and a former professor of Old Testament.

== Biography ==
At the age of eighteen, Peels left Dordrecht for Apeldoorn to study theology at the then still Theological College. He studied Akkadian at the Free University of Amsterdam. On 10 June 1982, Peels was confirmed as pastor of the Christian Reformed Church in Zoetermeer. From 1987 he was an associate professor of Old Testament subjects. In 1992, Peels obtained his PhD with a dissertation entitled The Vengeance of God. A theme about which he had also written his doctoral thesis. From 1993, Peels was professor of Old Testament subjects. He was active in the combined research group of the Theological University in Kampen and the Theological University in Apeldoorn called Biblical Exegesis and Systematic Theology (BEST). He was an editor of a book of essays on the subject of monsters mentioned in the Bible.

Peels retired on 27 January 2023. His farewell lecture was entitled: Then I am deeply moved...' Our images of God and Jeremiah's image of God'. During the ceremony, Peels was appointed officer in the Order of Orange-Nassau on behalf of the King. 'Vengeance', from the Hebrew word-group נקס in the Old Testament, is demonstrated by Peels to be associated with legitimate authorities instead of blood-vengeance. Synod Chairman Rev. J.G. Schenau called him the teacher of "preferring to listen longer". Because his handling of the Bible can be typified by the alliterative motto: "I'd rather listen longer." By this he means that when reading unruly Bible texts, we should not be too quick to impose a dogmatic or moral grid on the text, but rather listen longer to what it actually says and what it means.

Peels and his wife had four children, including philosopher and theologian Rik Peels.
