= Philosophy of Pseudoscience =

2013 nonfiction book by Pigliucci & Boudry

- 2013 Book jacket
- Author: Massimo Pigliucci and Maarten Boudry
- Language: English
- Subject: Pseudoscience, 20th Century falsification, Karl Popper, Science and Religion
- Genre: Nonfiction
- Published: August 2013
- Publisher: University of Chicago Press
- Publication place: United States
- Media type: Print, E-Book
- Pages: 480
- ISBN: 9780226051796 9780226051826 (online)
- OCLC: 824088394
- Website: Webpage

Philosophy of Pseudoscience: Reconsidering the Demarcation Problem is a set of 23 essays that wrestle with the demarcation problem which is the question of how to distinguish between science and non-science. The book's editors are the notable Massimo Pigliucci and Maarten Boudry. It was published in August 2013 by the University of Chicago Press.

== Reception ==
Derek D. Turner writing for The Quarterly Review of Biology says, "... this volume is well motivated. It would have benefitted, however, from the inclusion of someone representing and updating Laudan’s antidemarcationist perspective." Skeptical Inquirer magazine says, " The editors argue convincingly that the nature of science and the difference between science and pseudoscience are topics of crucial interest for philosophers, historians, and sociologists of science and also intrinsically interesting and directly relevant to people's lives." Choice magazine says, "If the philosophical problem of demarcating science from pseudoscience has a stale reputation, this book is a revitalizing gust of fresh air."

== See also ==
- Why People Believe Weird Things by Michael Shermer
- Pseudoscience
- List of topics characterized as pseudoscience
