= Steven Paas =

Steven Paas (born 1942) is a Dutch missionary, theologian, church historian, and lexicographer.

Paas graduated from the Koninklijke Militaire Academie in 1965 and served as a commissioned officer in the Royal Netherlands Army. He later obtained an MTh from the University of Amsterdam and a PhD from the Theological University of Apeldoorn. From 1997 to 2007 he taught at Zomba Theological College and served as a minister of the Church of Central Africa Presbyterian.

Paas is the author of the Oxford Chichewa-English and English-Chichewa Dictionary. He is the father of missiologist Stefan Paas.
