= Stephen Grimm =

American philosopher

- Citizenship: United States of America (U.S.A.)
- Education: Williams College (BA) University of Toronto (MA, Theology) University of Notre Dame (PhD, Philosophy)
- Occupations: Professor of Philosophy, Fordham University
- Known for: Epistemology of Understanding, Philosophy as a Way of Life

Stephen Robert Grimm is an American philosopher and Robert Southwell, S.J., Distinguished Professor of Philosophy and the Humanities at Fordham University in New York. His primary research is in epistemology, philosophy of religion, and the history of philosophy on topics related to understanding, wisdom, and the humanities.

== Education ==
Grimm received his BA from Williams College in 1993, MA in Theology from St. Michael’s College, University of Toronto in 1996, and PhD in Philosophy from the University of Notre Dame in 2005. His dissertation Understanding as an Epistemic Goal was completed under the direction of Michael DePaul and Ted Warfield.

== Research ==
Grimm’s research revolves around questions of inquiry, understanding, and wisdom as they intersect with the philosophy of science, religion, and the humanities. He is a Life Member of Clare Hall, University of Cambridge where he was a visiting fellow from 2016-2017. In 2022, he received Fordham's Distinguished Research Award in the Humanities.

Grimm is best known for his work on the nature of understanding. The discipline of epistemology has traditionally focused on the concept of knowledge over other epistemic concepts such as wisdom, inquiry, and understanding. While some philosophers, such as Jonathan Kvanvig, have argued that epistemologists should expand their inquiries to include understanding as a central epistemic concept, Grimm's work has significantly advanced and promoted this line of inquiry.

In 2013, he received a $4.2 million Templeton Foundation Grant to lead the "Varieties of Understanding” project. The interdisciplinary project (involving psychologists, philosophers, and theologians) aimed at examining "the various ways in which human beings understand the world, how these various types of understanding might be improved, and how we might deepen our understanding of the world." This project led to a wide range of scholarly outputs, including conferences, collaborative research initiatives, and multiple publications, including the Varieties of Understanding (Oxford University Press, 2019). Along with leading the "Varieties of Understanding" project, Grimm has published multiple, peer-reviewed journal articles on the epistemology of understanding and authored the first "Understanding" for the Stanford Encyclopedia of Philosophy.

Grimm has also published work on philosophy as a way of life, and was a co-leader on the Philosophy as a Way of Life Project sponsored by the University of Notre Dame and Mellon Foundation along with Megan Sullivan, Steve Angle, and Caleb Cohoe. He is the series editor for Oxford University Press’s Guides to the Good Life, a book series focused on the "transformative ideas that philosophers had about the good life, and the practices and ways of life that help us to pursue it." In 2025, Grimm published A Philosophy of the Humanities, defending the humanities contribution to human progress and exploring questions about the value of humanities field such as philosophy.

Grimm's recent work has expanded in the epistemology of artificial intelligence, collaborating with others on bringing his framework for human understanding into dialogue with work on machine understanding and the possibility of understanding in artificial intelligence systems ("Machine Understanding" in Trends in Cognitive Science, 2026; "Level of Understanding, World Models, and Artificial Intelligence" Philosophical Studies, 2026).

== Teaching ==
Grimm was an Edward Sorin Postdoctoral Fellow at Notre Dame from 2005 to 2006 before joining the philosophy department at the University of Montana from 2006 to 2008. Since 2008 he has been a Professor of Philosophy at Fordham University. He has been recognized for his undergraduate teaching at Fordham, and has lectured on the philosophy of understanding at various universities in China.

In addition to teaching in higher education, Stephen Grimm is the Project Director for The Visions of the Good in the Bronx. The Visions of the Good in the Bronx program receives funding from The Teagle Foundation’s Knowledge for Freedom Initiative, and brings high school juniors from the Bronx to Fordham University’s Rose Hill Campus for a three-week seminar followed by additional mentoring throughout the academic year. The seminar introduces students to college level humanities through exploring questions about how one should live and the good life, as well as mentoring for college prep and essential life skills.

== Selected works ==
=== Books ===
- A Philosophy of the Humanities. Co-Authored with Rik Peels and Rene van Woudenberg. New York: Oxford University Press. (2025) ISBN 978-0-19-774961-6

=== Edited books ===
- Varieties of Understanding: New Perspectives from Philosophy, Psychology, and Theology. Ed. Stephen R. Grimm. New York: Oxford University Press. (2019). ISBN 9780190860974
- Making Sense of the World: New Essays in the Philosophy of Understanding. Ed. Stephen R. Grimm. New York: Oxford University Press. (2018). ISBN 9780190469863
- Explaining Understanding: New Essays in Epistemology and Philosophy of Science. Eds. Stephen R. Grimm, Christoph Baumberger, and Sabine Ammon. New York: Routledge. (2016) ISBN 9780367736767

=== Articles ===
- "Understanding." The Stanford Encyclopedia of Philosophy. (2021)
- “Wisdom.” Australasian Journal of Philosophy 93: 139-154. (2015) https://doi.org/10.1080/00048402.2014.937449
- “Understanding as Knowledge of Causes.” In Virtue Epistemology Naturalized: Bridges Between Virtue Epistemology and Philosophy of Science (Synthese Library). Ed. Abrol Fairweather. New York: Springer. (2014) https://doi.org/10.1007/978-3-319-04672-3_19
- “The Value of Understanding.” Philosophy Compass 7: 103-117. (2012) https://doi.org/10.1111/j.1747-9991.2011.00460.x
- “Understanding.” In The Routledge Companion to Epistemology. Eds. Duncan Pritchard and Sven Berneker. New York: Routledge. (2011) ISBN 9780415722698
- “The Goal of Explanation.” Studies in the History and Philosophy of Science 41: 337-344. (2010) https://doi.org/10.1016/j.shpsa.2010.10.006
- “Epistemic Normativity.” In The Value of Knowledge. Eds. Adrian Haddock, Alan Millar, and Duncan Pritchard. New York: Oxford University Press. (2009) • Reprinted in Virtue Epistemology: MIT Readers in Contemporary Philosophy. Cambridge, MA: MIT Press. (2012) https://doi.org/10.1093/acprof:oso/9780199231188.003.0012
- “Is Understanding a Species of Knowledge?” British Journal for the Philosophy of Science 57: 515-535. (2006) https://doi.org/10.1093/bjps/axl015
