= Alicja Gescinska =

Polish-Belgian philosopher (born 1981)

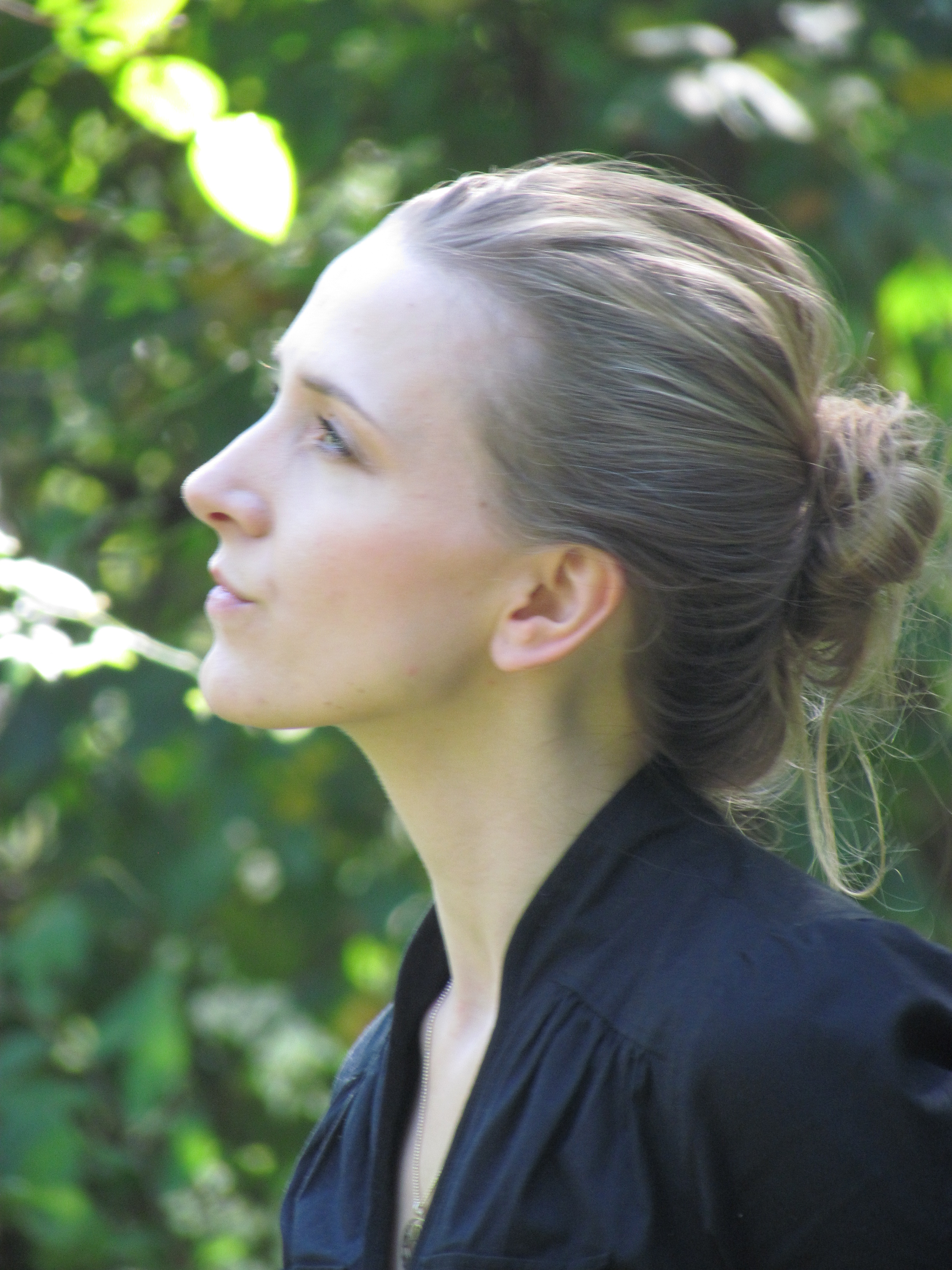
- Gescinska in 2013
- Born: 1981 (age 44–45); Warsaw, Poland

Philosophical work
- Era: Contemporary philosophy
- Region: Western philosophy
- Website: www.gescinska.com

Alicja Anna Gescinska (Warsaw, 1981) is a Polish-Belgian philosopher.

== Academic career ==
Alicja Gescinska obtained a master's degree summa cum laude in Moral Sciences at Ghent University. She became Doctor of Philosophy at the same university in 2012, having written a dissertation on the philosophy of Max Scheler and Karol Wojtyla: Freedom and Persons: A Philosophical Inquiry into the Meaning of Human Agency in the Thought of Max Scheler and Karol Wojtyla.

Her book De verovering van de vrijheid (The conquest of freedom) – a philosophical and personal reflection on the meaning of freedom – was very well-received. It was awarded by deMens.nu as the best non-fiction book of 2010–2011, and was shortlisted for other literary prizes.

In 2012 she wrote an essay on fear and freedom, which is based on the Freedom Lecture she delivered on the Dutch Liberation Day, 5 May 2012, at Felix Meritis in Amsterdam. The essay concerns the way in which resentment and hatred lead to the decline of personal and political freedom.

From 2013 to 2014 Gescinska worked as a postdoctoral researcher at Princeton University, after which she began working at Amherst College where she teaches courses on the philosophy of freedom and on European politics.

== Media personality ==
She is in demand as a pundit in Belgium and The Netherlands. She is a member of the “Philosophical Team” of the Dutch newspaper Trouw, and wrote a fortnightly philosophical column for the Belgian newspaper De Morgen from 2012 to 2014.

In 2016 her debut novel, Een soort van liefde (A Kind of Love), was published by De Bezige Bij. She also presented the programme Wanderlust on the Belgian television channel Canvas, in which she travelled to meet and interview philosophers, writers, artists and scientists. In the first episode she met English philosopher Roger Scruton, in the second Scottish sculptor Alexander Stoddart, in the third Dutch novelist Connie Palmen, in the fourth neuroscientist Raymond Tallis, and in the fifth Benedictine monk Laurence Freeman. In September 2017 the first episode of the second season of Wanderlust was broadcast. The second season includes episodes with Youssou N'Dour, Theodore Dalrymple, Lesley Hazleton and Sara Maitland.
