= Massimo Pigliucci =

American professor of philosophy (born 1964)

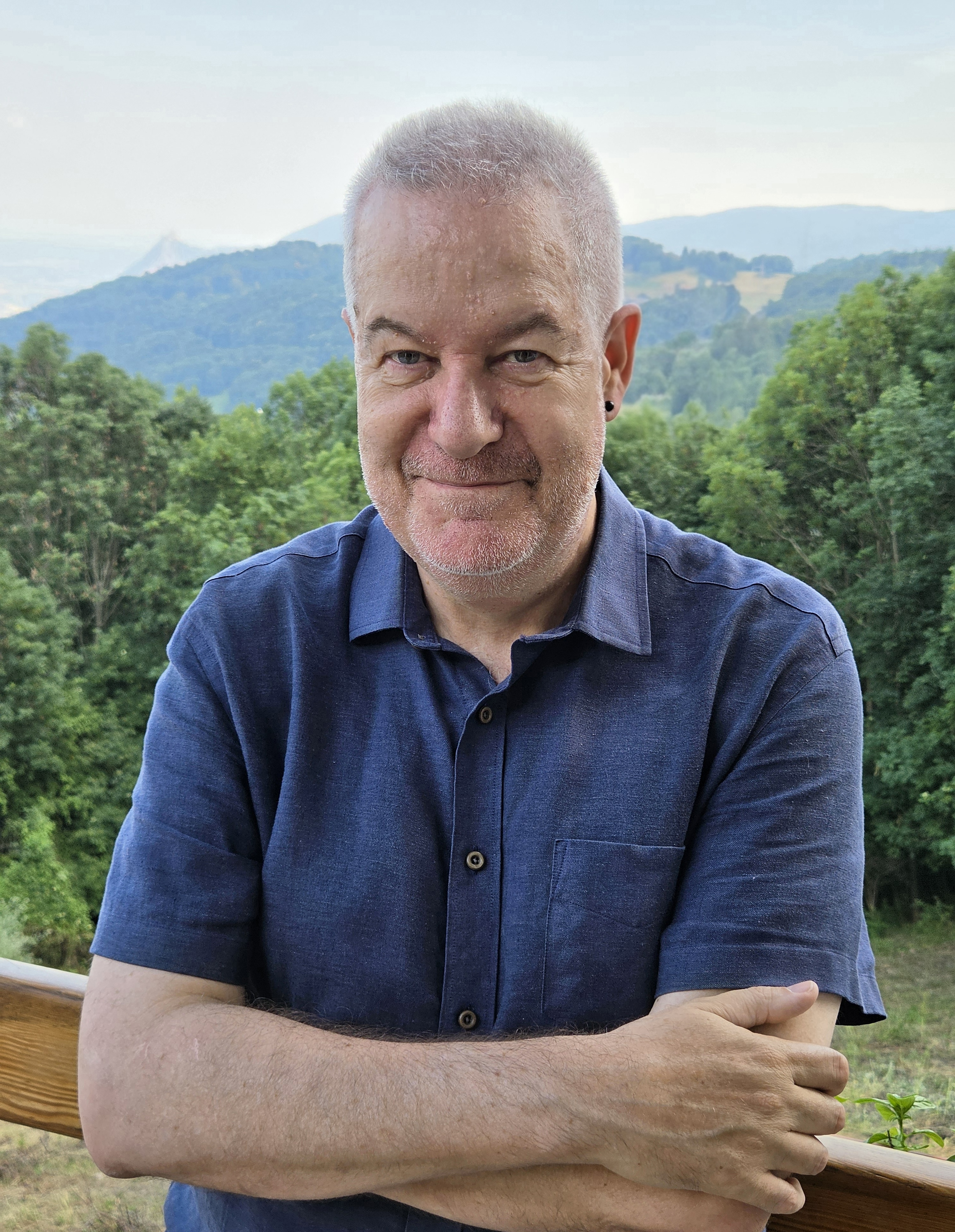
- Massimo in 2026
- Born: January 16, 1964 (age 62); Monrovia, Liberia

Education
- Education: University of Tennessee, PhD in Philosophy of Science; University of Connecticut, PhD in Botany; University of Ferrara, Doctorate in Genetics; Sapienza University of Rome, BS and Master's in Biological Sciences

Philosophical work
- Era: Contemporary philosophy
- Region: Western philosophy
- School: Scientific skepticism, secular humanism, contemporary Stoicism
- Institutions: City College of New York
- Main interests: Philosophy of science Philosophy of pseudoscience Relationship between science and religion Demarcation problem
- Massimo Pigliucci's voice Recorded October 2016
- Website: Official website

Massimo Pigliucci (MASS-ee-MO Peel-YOU-chee; born January 16, 1964) is an Italian philosopher and biologist who is professor of philosophy at the City College of New York. He is a critic of pseudoscience (including creationism), and an advocate for secularism and science education. His recent work has focused on Stoicism.

== Biography ==
Pigliucci was born in Monrovia, Liberia and raised in Rome. He earned a Laurea from Sapienza University of Rome in 1986. He then earned a doctorate in genetics from the University of Ferrara in 1990, a PhD in botany from the University of Connecticut in 1994, and a PhD in the philosophy of science from the University of Tennessee in 2003. He is a fellow of the American Association for the Advancement of Science and of the Committee for Skeptical Inquiry.

Pigliucci was formerly a professor of ecology and evolution at Stony Brook University. He explored phenotypic plasticity, genotype–environment interactions, natural selection, and the constraints imposed on natural selection by the genetic and developmental makeup of organisms. In 1997, while working at the University of Tennessee, Pigliucci received the Theodosius Dobzhansky Prize, awarded annually by the Society for the Study of Evolution to recognize the accomplishments and future promise of an outstanding young evolutionary biologist. As a philosopher, Pigliucci is interested in the structure and foundations of evolutionary theory, the relationship between science and philosophy, and the relationship between science and religion. He is a proponent of an extended evolutionary synthesis to unify parts of biology not covered by the "modern synthesis" of the 20th century.

Pigliucci has written regularly for Skeptical Inquirer. His article topics include such as climate change denial, intelligent design, pseudoscience, and philosophy. He has also written for Philosophy Now and writes a Substack newsletter called Figs in Winter. He has debated "deniers of evolution" (young-earth creationists and intelligent design proponents), including young earth creationists Duane Gish and Kent Hovind and intelligent design proponents William Dembski and Jonathan Wells, on many occasions.

His video podcast, Ars Vivendi, features conversations with authors and translators who publish about practical ancient philosophy.

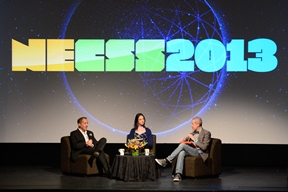
Michael Shermer, Julia Galef and Massimo Pigliucci at NECSS 2013

== Critical thinking and skepticism ==
Pigliucci is an atheist, but does not believe that science necessarily demands atheism, because of two distinctions: that between methodological naturalism and philosophical naturalism, and that between value judgements and matters of fact. He believes that many scientists and science educators fail to appreciate these differences. Pigliucci has criticized New Atheist writers for embracing what he considers to be scientism (although he largely excludes philosopher Daniel Dennett from this charge). In a discussion of his book Answers for Aristotle: How Science and Philosophy Can Lead Us to a More Meaningful Life, Pigliucci told Skepticality podcast host Derek Colanduno, "Aristotle was the first ancient thinker to really take seriously the idea that you need both empirical facts, you need an evidence-based approach to the world and you need to be able to reflect on the meaning of those facts... If you want answers to moral questions then you don't ask the neurobiologist, you don't ask the evolutionary biologist, you ask the philosopher."

Pigliucci describes the mission of skeptics, referencing Carl Sagan's The Demon-Haunted World saying "What skeptics are about is to keep that candle lit and spread it as much as possible". Pigliucci is an event co-host for New York City Skeptics.

In 1998, he debated William Lane Craig over the existence of God at the University of Tennessee, Knoxville. Also in 2001 he debated Craig about the same topic.

Massimo Pigliucci criticized the newspaper article by Pope Francis entitled, "An open dialogue with non-believers". Pigliucci viewed the article as a monologue rather than a dialogue and, in a response personally addressed to Pope Francis, wrote that the Pope only offered non-believers "a reaffirmation of entirely unsubstantiated fantasies about God and his Son...followed by a confusion between the concept of love and truth, the whole peppered by a significant amount of historical revisionism and downright denial of the ugliest facets of your Church."

=== Stoicism ===
Pigliucci became a popularizer of Stoicism and one of the driving forces in Stoicism's resurgence in the United States in the early twenty-first century. His 2015 essay for The New York Times on the topic was one of the most shared articles to date. Pigliucci said he always felt Stoicism was part of his Italian heritage, but he came to practice it after having experimented with Buddhism, though he finds that the two schools of thought share similarities.

I actually tried to study Buddhism for a bit, but the parts I managed to get exposed to felt too alien, couched in cultural, linguistic, and conceptual terms that did not resonate with me. By contrast, when I picked up Epictetus, or Marcus, or Seneca, I immediately felt at home.

=== Neoskepticism ===
In 2021 Pigliucci announced a shift of interest away from straightforward Stoicism and towards, as he said, "a new synthesis, something that I have called Neoskepticism, and which uses the combined insights of the ancient Skeptics and Stoics to craft a better way to think about and especially live one’s life."

=== On consciousness ===
Pigliucci has criticized David Chalmers' hard problem of consciousness, and he similarly is a critic of panpsychism. While he is a realist about consciousness, he thinks that claiming there is a distinction between the so-called hard and easy problems of consciousness is a category error.

=== Rationally Speaking ===
In August 2000 Pigliucci started a monthly internet column called Rationally Speaking. In August 2005, the column became a blog, where he wrote posts until March 2014. Starting in February 2010, he co-hosted the bi-weekly Rationally Speaking podcast with Julia Galef, whom he first met at the Northeast Conference on Science and Skepticism, held in September 2009. The podcast was produced by the New York City Skeptics. The show has had many guests—scientists, philosophers—discussing matters of reason, skepticism and rationality. In 2010, Neil DeGrasse Tyson explained on the show his justification for spending large amounts of government money on space programs. He eventually printed the transcript of his performance as a guest on the show in his book Space Chronicles as a full chapter covering eight pages. Another episode in which Tyson explained his position on the label "atheism" received attention on NPR. Pigliucci left the podcast in 2015 to pursue his other interests. Galef continued to host the podcast solo until 2021.

== Bibliography ==
=== Books ===
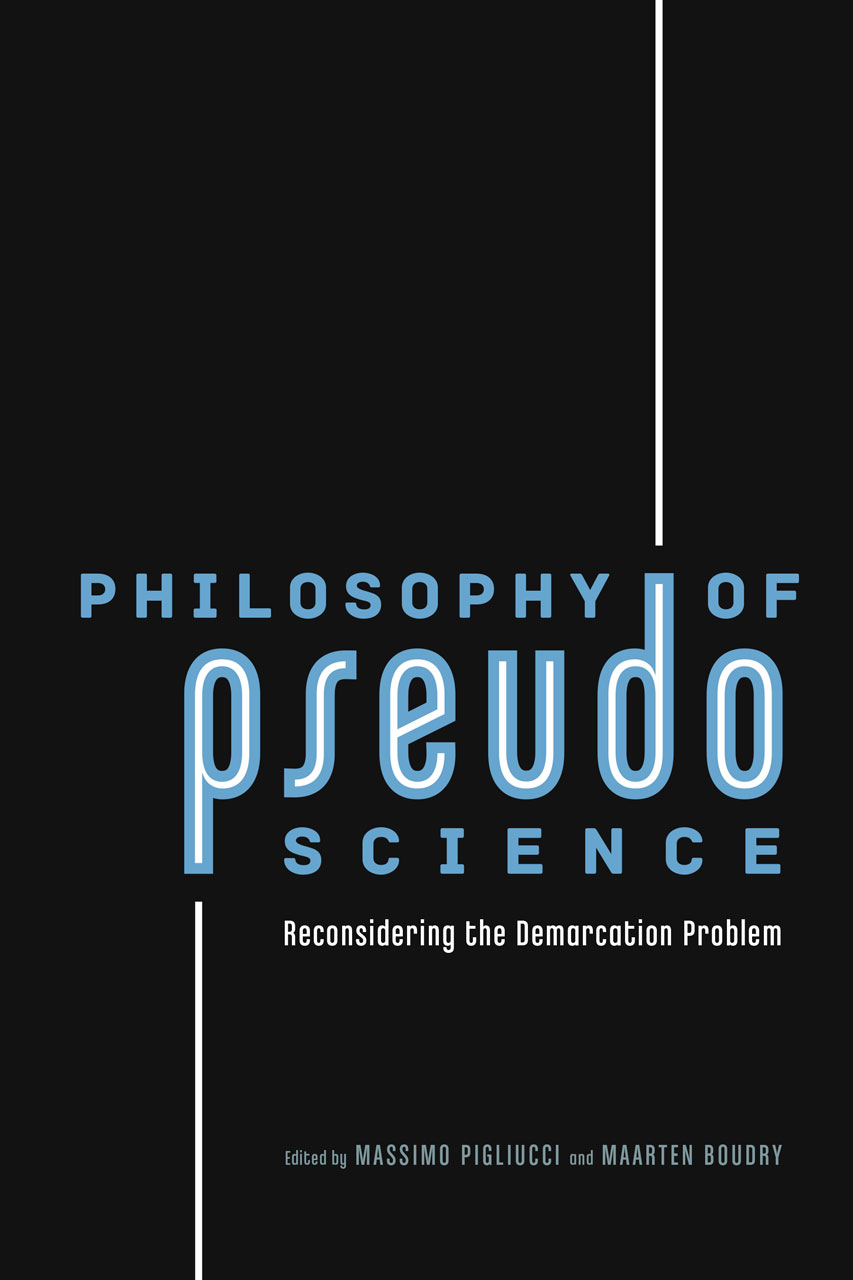
Cover of Philosophy of Pseudoscience

- Il Romanzo della Vita (The Romance of Life, Mondadori, 1986)
- La Via delle Stelle (The Road to the Stars, with Franco Foresta Martin, Mursia, 1987)
- Schlichting, Carl; Pigliucci, Massimo (1998). Phenotypic Evolution : a reaction norm perspective. Sunderland, Mass.: Sinauer.
- Pigliucci, Massimo (2000). Tales of the Rational: Skeptical Essays About Nature and Science (1st ed.). Atlanta, Ga.: Freethought Press. ISBN 9781887392112. OCLC 45568611. "A series of essays on atheism, straw-man arguments, creationism and the like"
- Pigliucci, Massimo (2001). Phenotypic Plasticity: Beyond Nature and Nurture. Baltimore: Johns Hopkins University Press. "A technical volume on research concerning nature and nurture questions"
- Denying Evolution: Creationism, Scientism, and the Nature of Science (Sinauer, 2002) ISBN 0-87893-659-9: This book covers the evolution-creation controversy, better science teaching, and why people have difficulties with critical thinking.
- Phenotypic Integration: Studying the Ecology and Evolution of Complex Phenotypes (with Katherine Preston, eds., Oxford University Press, 2003) ISBN 0195160436: A collection of technical essays on the evolution of complex biological organs.
- Making Sense of Evolution: The Conceptual Foundations of Evolutionary Biology (with Jonathan Kaplan, University of Chicago Press, 2006, ISBN 978-0-226-66837-6): A philosophical examination of the fundamental concepts of evolutionary theory and practice.
- Evolution: The Extended Synthesis (with Gerd B. Muller, MIT Press, 2010, ISBN 978-0262513678)
- Nonsense on Stilts: How to Tell Science from Bunk (University of Chicago Press, 2010, ISBN 978-0-226-66786-7, 2nd edn. 2018): This book presents a number of case studies on controversial topics in order to examine how science is conducted, how it is disseminated, how it is interpreted, and what it means to our society.
- Answers for Aristotle: How Science and Philosophy Can Lead Us to a More Meaningful Life (Basic Books, 2012, ISBN 978-0-465-02138-3)
- Philosophy of Pseudoscience: Reconsidering the Demarcation Problem (with Maarten Boudry, eds., University of Chicago Press, 2013, ISBN 978-0226051963)
- How to Be a Stoic: Using Ancient Philosophy to Live a Modern Life (Basic Books, 2nd edn, 2017, ISBN 978-0465097951)
- Science Unlimited? The Challenges of Scientism (with Maarten Boudry, eds., University of Chicago Press, 2018)
- A Handbook for New Stoics: How to Thrive in a World Out of Your Control – 52 Week-by-Week Lessons (with Gregory Lopez, The Experiment, 2019, ISBN 978-1615195336)
- A Field Guide to a Happy Life: 53 Brief Lessons for Living (Basic Books, 2020, ISBN 978-1541646933)
- How to Live a Good Life: A Guide to Choosing Your Personal Philosophy of Life (with Skye Cleary and Daniel Kaufman, eds., Vintage, 2020)
- Think like a Stoic: Ancient Wisdom for Today’s World (The Teaching Company, 2021)
- The Quest for Character: What the Story of Socrates and Alcibiades Teaches Us about Our Search for Good Leaders (Basic Books, 2022)
- Books that Matter: Marcus Aurelius’s Meditations (The Teaching Company, 2025). Recipient of 2026 Telly Award
- Beyond Stoicism: A Guide to the Good Life with Stoics, Skeptics, Epicureans, and Other Ancient Philosophers (with Gregory Lopez and Meredith Alexander Kunz, The Experiment, 2025)
- How to Be a (Happy) Skeptic: The Power of Doubt in a Meaningful Life - Lessons from Cicero's Philosophy (Penguin, 2026).

=== Articles ===
The following are a select few of Pigliucci's most recent articles and papers. For a complete list, visit his Official Website.

Others sources for his articles and papers be found at his Google Scholar site or the Internet Infidels' Secular Web.

- In press. Cicero, friendly critic of Stoicism. In: Oxford Handbook of Stoicism, ed. by Dominic Bailey, Oxford University Press.
- In press. Philosophy as a way of life as a guide to contemporary daily life. In: Oxford Handbook of Philosophy as a Way of Life, ed. by Marta Faustino and Hélder Telo, Oxford University Press.
- In press. Some things are up to us while others are not: the Stoic way. In: Philosophers on How to Live: Talking about Morality, ed. by Jack Symes, Bloomsbury Academic.
- 2026. Epictete l’esclave devenu professeur. In: 10 Lecons de Vie de Philosophes, ed. by Normand Baillargeon, Éditions XYZ.
- 2026. Can Skepticism be a philosophy of life? In: Philosophy as a Way of Life, ed. by Matthew Sharpe, Brill.
- 2025. Cicero, the Stoics, and political philosophy. Syndicate Philosophy, special discussion on Why Cicero Matters.
- 2025. It’s your fault you’re not happy. In: Too Weird to Believe, Too Plausible to Deny, ed. by Clifford Sosis, Routledge.
- 2025. Nature vs nurture: time to let it go. With Kaplan, J. In: Beyond Nature and Nurture: Perspectives on Human Multidimensionality, ed. by Javier Pérez and Jara Íñigo Onga, Springer-Synthese.
- 2025. The borderlines between philosophy and therapy. Philosophy, Psychiatry, & Psychology 32(2):183-185.
- 2024. The problem of pseudoscience: Who should we trust when it comes to fringe beliefs? In: Expertise–Philosophical Perspectives, ed. by Mirko Farina, Andrea Lavazza, and Duncan Pritchard, Oxford University Press, pp. 13–30.
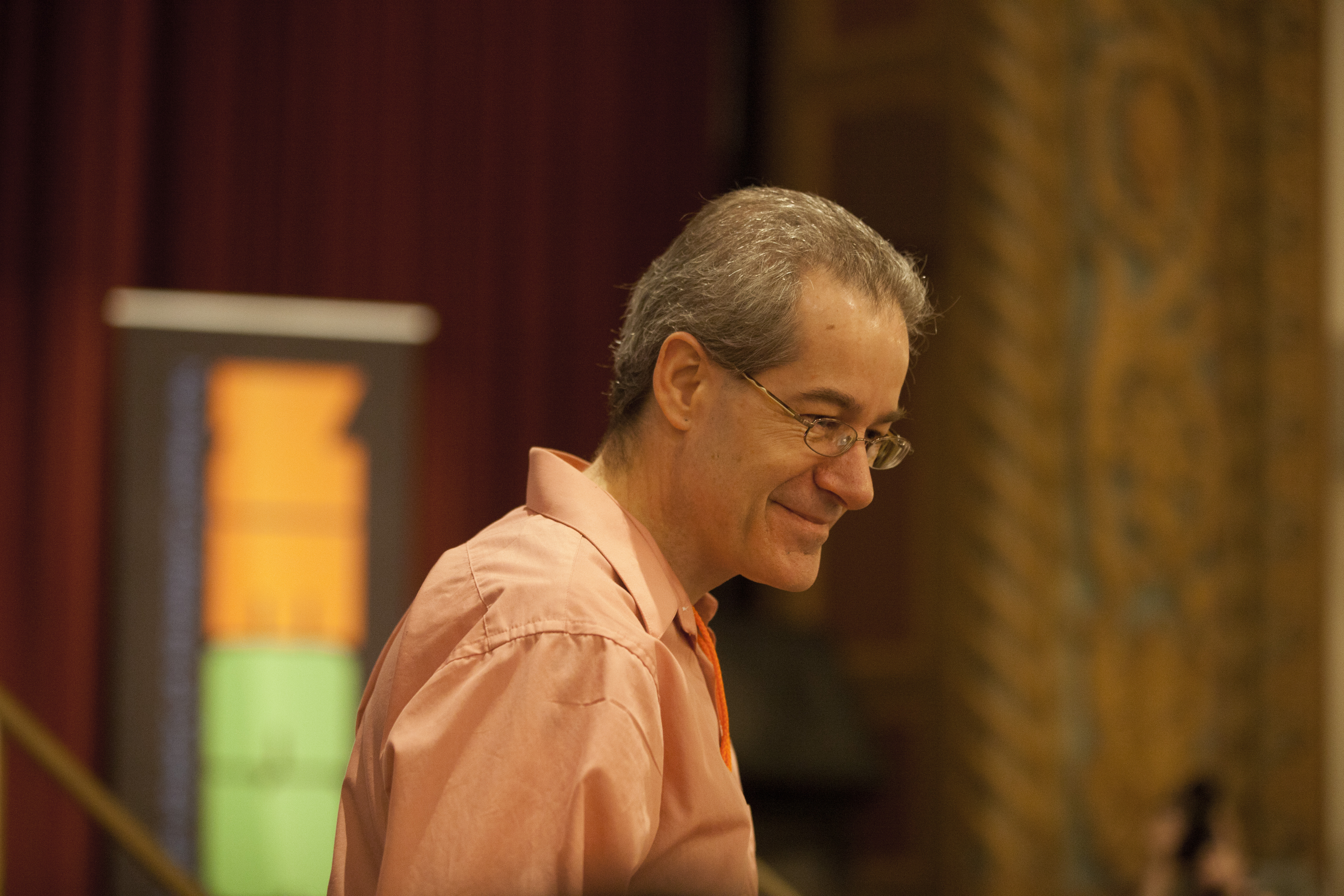
Pigliucci speaking at NECSS 2011

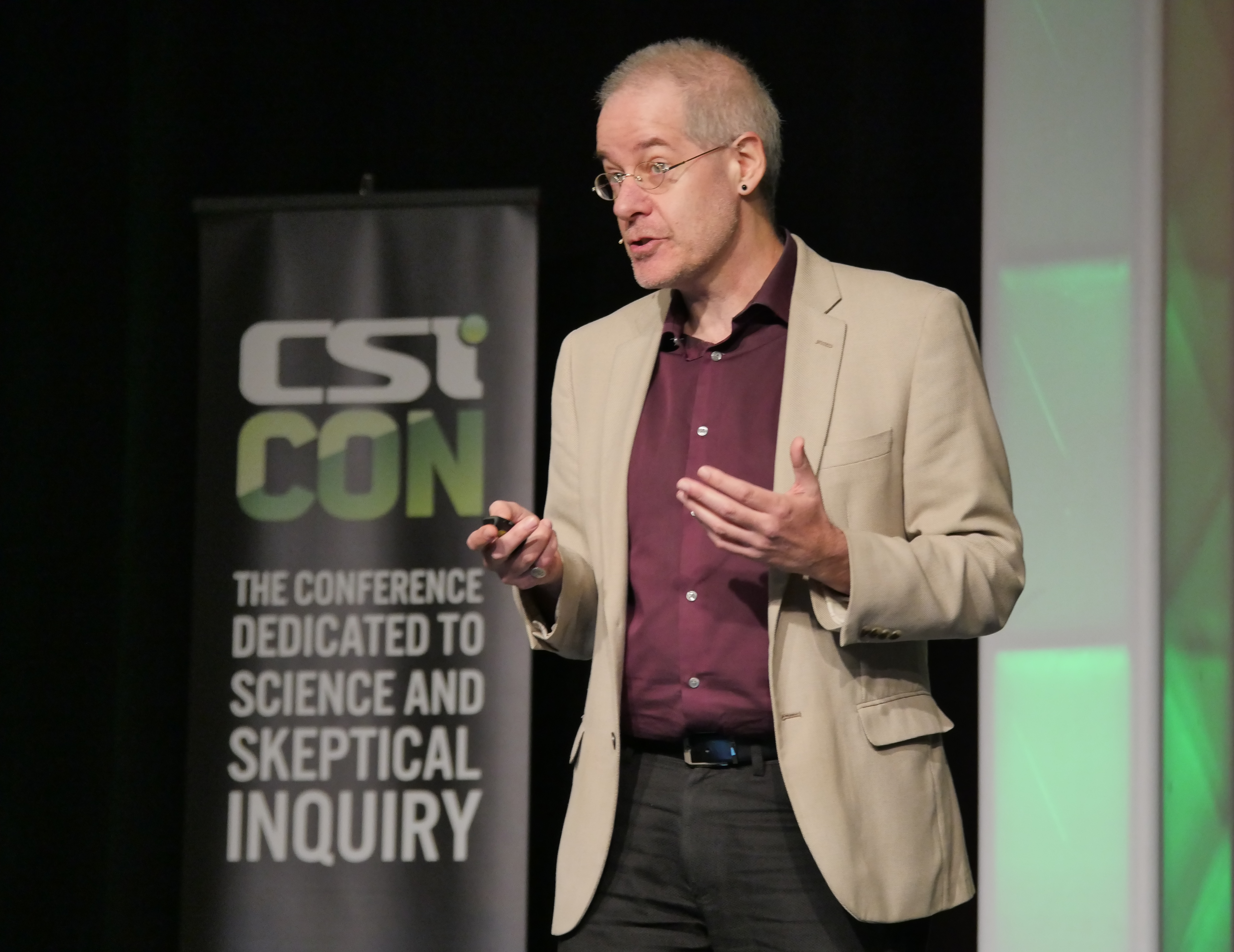
Pigliucci speaking at CSICon 2018

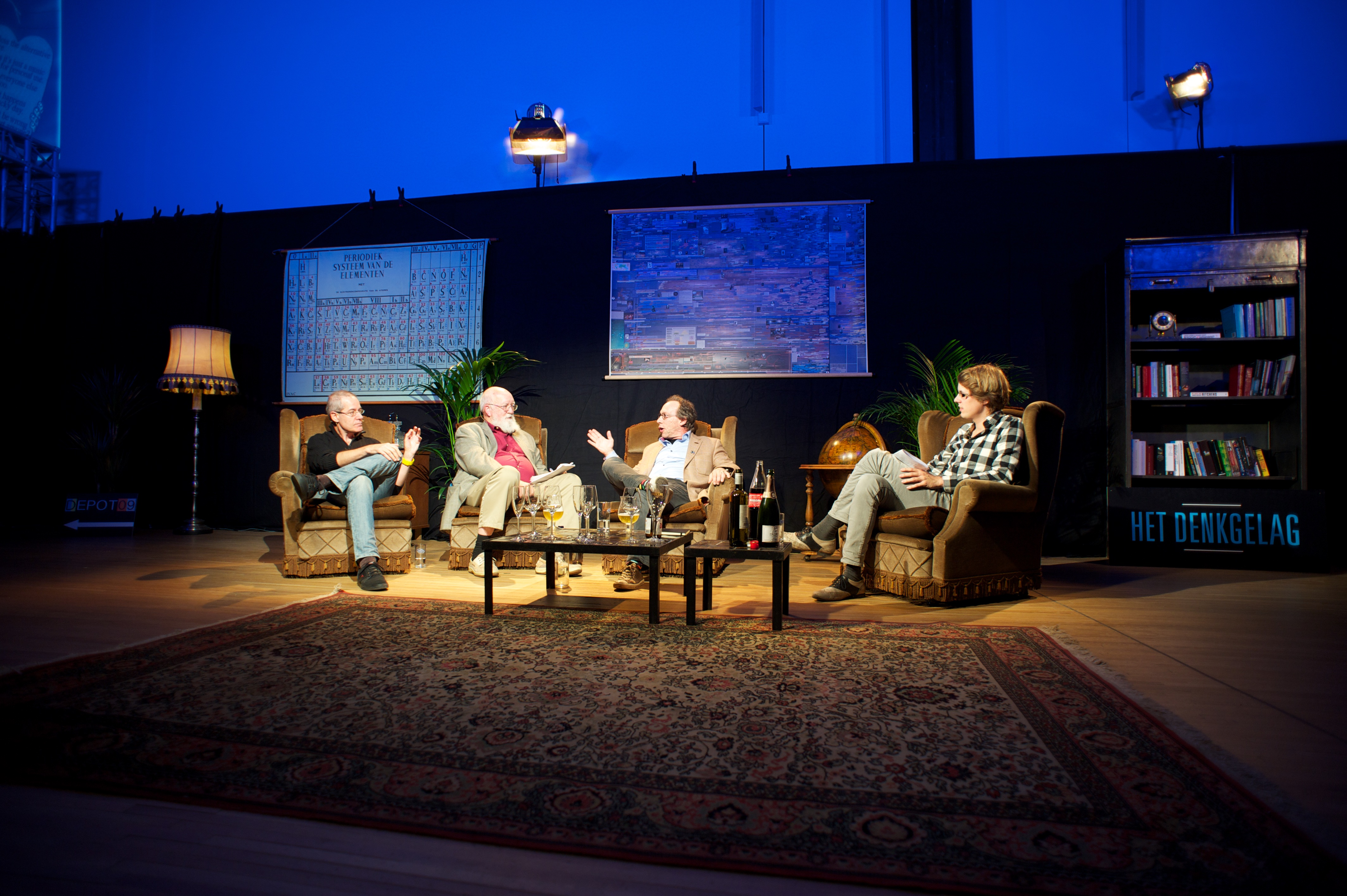
Daniel Dennett, Pigliucci and Lawrence Krauss on a debate about "The Limits of Science"

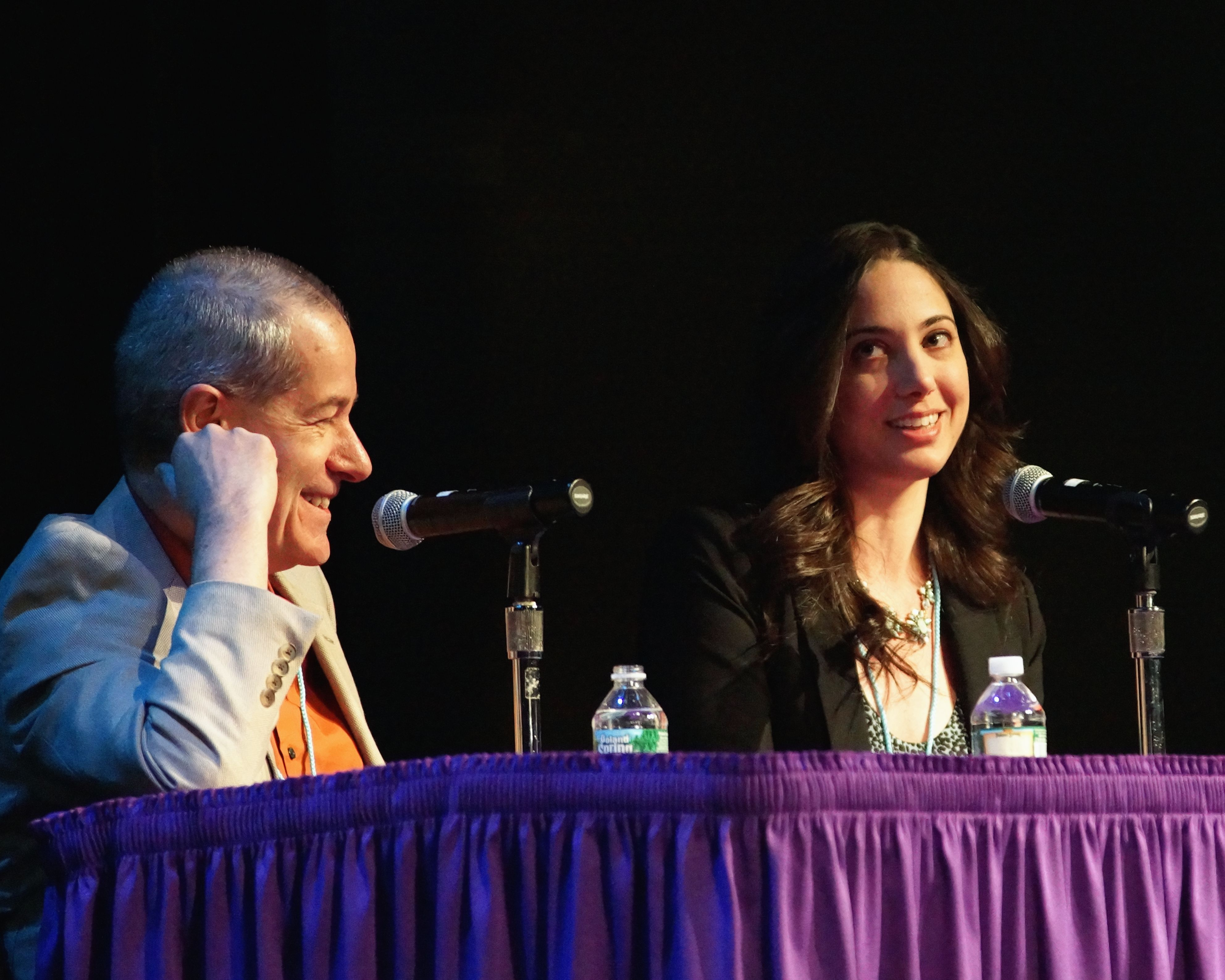
Pigliucci and Julia Galef at NECSS 2015 during the last Rationally Speaking episode they co-hosted together
