= Taede A. Smedes =

Dutch philosopher

Taede Anne Smedes (born 3 July 1973 in Drachten) is a Dutch philosopher of religion specializing in the relationship between religion and science. He received a Ph.D. degree from the University of Groningen in 2004 for a thesis on Avoiding Balaam's Mistake: Exploring Divine Action in an Age of Scientism.

== Books ==
=== Authored ===
- — (2004). Chaos, Complexity, and God: Divine Action and Scientism. Studies in philosophical theology. Peeters. ISBN 978-90-429-1521-3.
- — (2006). God en de menselijke maat: Gods handelen en het natuurwetenschappelijk wereldbeeld [God and the human scale: God's actions and the natural scientific worldview] (in Dutch). Zoetermeer: Meinema. ISBN 978-90-211-4113-8.
- — (2009). God én Darwin: geloof kan niet om evolutie heen [God and Darwin: Religion cannot ignore evolution] (in Dutch). Nieuw Amsterdam. ISBN 978-90-468-0600-5.
- — (2016). God, iets of niets?: de postseculiere maatschappij tussen 'geloof' en 'ongeloof' [God, something or nothing? The postsecular society between faith and disbelief] (in Dutch). Amsterdam University Press. ISBN 978-90-485-3303-9.
- — (2018). Thuis in de kosmos: het epos van evolutie en de vraag naar de zin van ons bestaan [At home in the cosmos: The epic of evolution and the question of the meaning of our existence] (in Dutch). Amsterdam University Press. ISBN 978-94-6298-708-1.

=== Edited ===
- Drees, Willem; Meisinger, Hubert; Smedes, Taede Anne, eds. (2008). Creation's diversity: Voices from theology and science. London: T&T Clark. ISBN 978-0-567-03329-1.
- Evers, Dirk; Jackelén, Antje; Smedes, Taede Anne, eds. (2010). How Do We Know?: Understanding in science and theology. Issues in Science and Theology. London: T&T Clark. ISBN 978-0-567-37104-1.
- Oomen, Palmyre M. F.; Smedes, Taede Anne, eds. (2010). Evolutie, cultuur en religie: perspectieven vanuit biologie en theologie [Evolution, culture and religion: Perspectives from biology and theology] (in Dutch). Kampen, Overijssel, Netherlands: Klement. ISBN 978-90-8687-072-1.
- Evers, Dirk; Fuller, Michael; Jackelén, Antje; Smedes, Taede Anne, eds. (2012). Is religion natural?. Issues in Science and Theology. London: T & T Clark. ISBN 978-0-567-22727-0.
