= Stefan Paas =

Dutch theologian & missiologist (1969-)

Stefan Paas (born 17 September 17 1969) is a Dutch theologian and missiologist. He is Director of the Centre for Church and Mission in the West, Professor of Missiology at Theological University Kampen, and J. H. Bavinck Professor of Missiology and Intercultural Theology at Vrije Universiteit Amsterdam. He specialises in church planting in a post-Christian context.

Stefan Paas is the son of missionary-theologian Steven Paas. Stefan dates the moment of his conversion to age 18. He obtained a PhD in Old Testament from Utrecht University in 1998.
