= Marine biogeochemical cycles =

Marine biogeochemical cycles

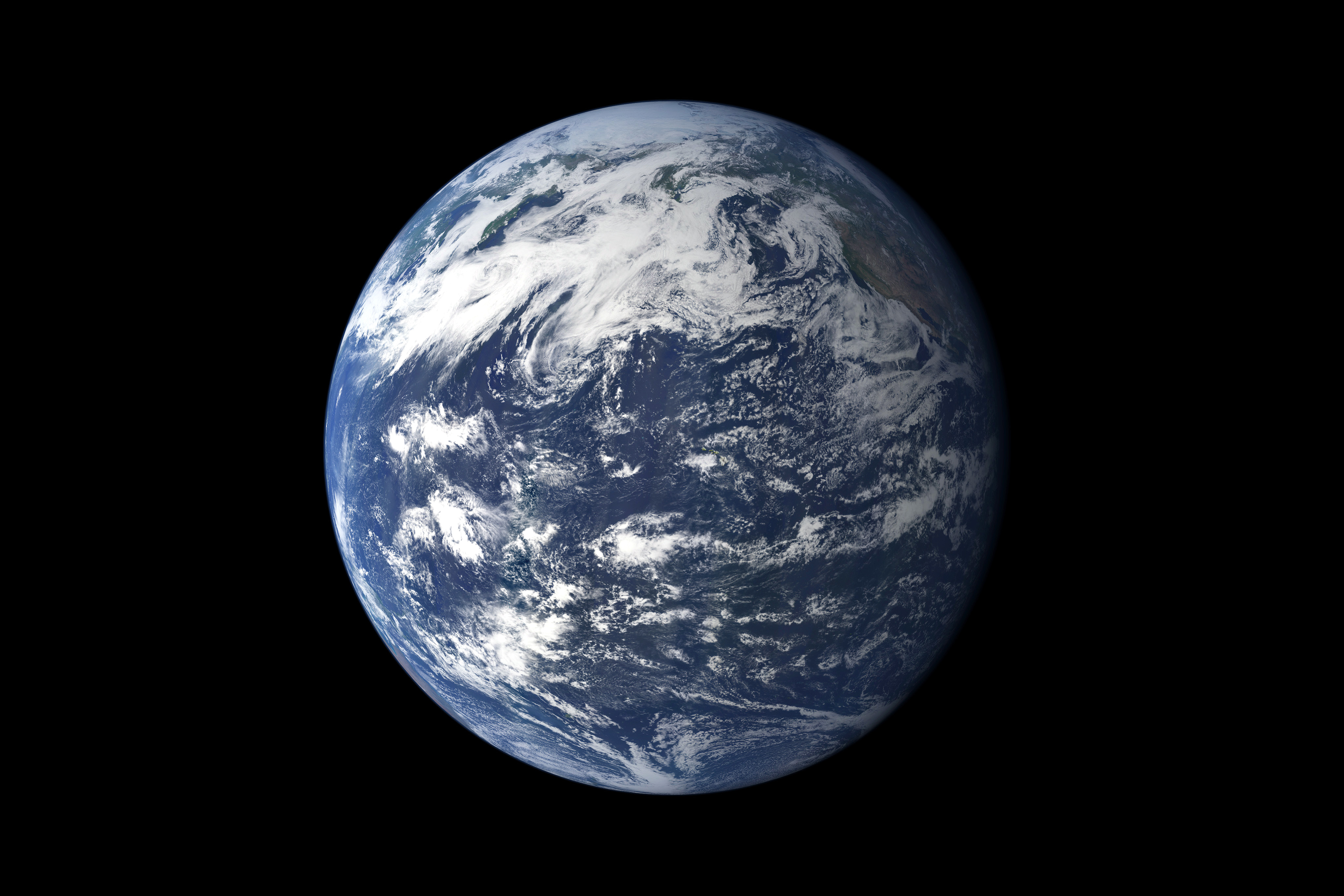
The dominant feature of the planet viewed from space is water – oceans of liquid water flood most of the surface while water vapour swirls in atmospheric clouds and the poles are capped with ice. Taken as a whole, the oceans form a single marine system where liquid water – the "universal solvent" – dissolves nutrients and substances containing elements such as oxygen, carbon, nitrogen and phosphorus. These substances are endlessly cycled and recycled, chemically combined and then broken down again, dissolved and then precipitated or evaporated, imported from and exported back to the land and the atmosphere and the ocean floor. Powered both by the biological activity of marine organisms and by the natural forces of the Sun and tides and movements within the Earth's crust, these are the marine biogeochemical cycles.

Marine biogeochemical cycles are biogeochemical cycles that occur within marine environments, that is, in the saltwater of seas or oceans or the brackish water of coastal estuaries. These biogeochemical cycles are the pathways chemical substances and elements move through within the marine environment. In addition, substances and elements can be imported into or exported from the marine environment. These imports and exports can occur as exchanges with the atmosphere above, the ocean floor below, or as runoff from the land.

There are biogeochemical cycles for the elements calcium, carbon, hydrogen, mercury, nitrogen, oxygen, phosphorus, selenium, and sulfur; molecular cycles for water and silica; macroscopic cycles such as the rock cycle; as well as human-induced cycles for synthetic compounds such as polychlorinated biphenyl (PCB). In some cycles there are reservoirs where a substance can be stored for a long time. The cycling of these elements is interconnected.

Marine organisms, and particularly marine microorganisms are crucial for the functioning of many of these cycles. The forces driving biogeochemical cycles include metabolic processes within organisms, geological processes involving the Earth's mantle, as well as chemical reactions among the substances themselves, which is why these are called biogeochemical cycles. While chemical substances can be broken down and recombined, the chemical elements themselves can be neither created nor destroyed by these forces, so apart from some losses to and gains from outer space, elements are recycled or stored (sequestered) somewhere on or within the planet.

== Overview ==
Energy flows directionally through ecosystems, entering as sunlight (or inorganic molecules for chemoautotrophs) and leaving as heat during the many transfers between trophic levels. However, the matter that makes up living organisms is conserved and recycled. The six most common elements associated with organic molecules—carbon, nitrogen, hydrogen, oxygen, phosphorus, and sulfur—take a variety of chemical forms and may exist for long periods in the atmosphere, on land, in water, or beneath the Earth's surface. Geologic processes, such as weathering, erosion, water drainage, and the subduction of the continental plates, all play a role in this recycling of materials. Because geology and chemistry have major roles in the study of this process, the recycling of inorganic matter between living organisms and their environment is called a biogeochemical cycle.

The six aforementioned elements are used by organisms in a variety of ways. Hydrogen and oxygen are found in water and organic molecules, both of which are essential to life. Carbon is found in all organic molecules, whereas nitrogen is an important component of nucleic acids and proteins. Phosphorus is used to make nucleic acids and the phospholipids that comprise biological membranes. Sulfur is critical to the three-dimensional shape of proteins. The cycling of these elements is interconnected. For example, the movement of water is critical for leaching sulfur and phosphorus into rivers which can then flow into oceans. Minerals cycle through the biosphere between the biotic and abiotic components and from one organism to another.

== The water cycle ==
Interaction of terrestrial and atmospheric water cycles with the marine water cycle

Water is the medium of the oceans, the medium which carries all the substances and elements involved in the marine biogeochemical cycles. Water as found in nature almost always includes dissolved substances, so water has been described as the "universal solvent" for its ability to dissolve so many substances. This ability allows it to be the "solvent of life" Water is also the only common substance that exists as solid, liquid, and gas in normal terrestrial conditions. Since liquid water flows, ocean waters cycle and flow in currents around the world. Since water easily changes phase, it can be carried into the atmosphere as water vapour or frozen as an iceberg. It can then precipitate or melt to become liquid water again. All marine life is immersed in water, the matrix and womb of life itself. Water can be broken down into its constituent hydrogen and oxygen by metabolic or abiotic processes, and later recombined to become water again.

While the water cycle is itself a biogeochemical cycle, flow of water over and beneath the Earth is a key component of the cycling of other biogeochemicals. Runoff is responsible for almost all of the transport of eroded sediment and phosphorus from land to waterbodies. Cultural eutrophication of lakes is primarily due to phosphorus, applied in excess to agricultural fields in fertilizers, and then transported overland and down rivers. Both runoff and groundwater flow play significant roles in transporting nitrogen from the land to waterbodies. The dead zone at the outlet of the Mississippi River is a consequence of nitrates from fertilizer being carried off agricultural fields and funnelled down the river system to the Gulf of Mexico. Runoff also plays a part in the carbon cycle, again through the transport of eroded rock and soil.

=== Ocean salinity ===
Ocean salinity is derived mainly from the weathering of rocks and the transport of dissolved salts from the land, with lesser contributions from hydrothermal vents in the seafloor. Evaporation of ocean water and formation of sea ice further increase the salinity of the ocean. However these processes which increase salinity are continually counterbalanced by processes that decrease salinity, such as the continuous input of fresh water from rivers, precipitation of rain and snow, and the melting of ice. The two most prevalent ions in seawater are chloride and sodium. Together, they make up around 85 per cent of all dissolved ions in the ocean. Magnesium and sulfate ions make up most of the rest. Salinity varies with temperature, evaporation, and precipitation. It is generally low at the equator and poles, and high at mid-latitudes.

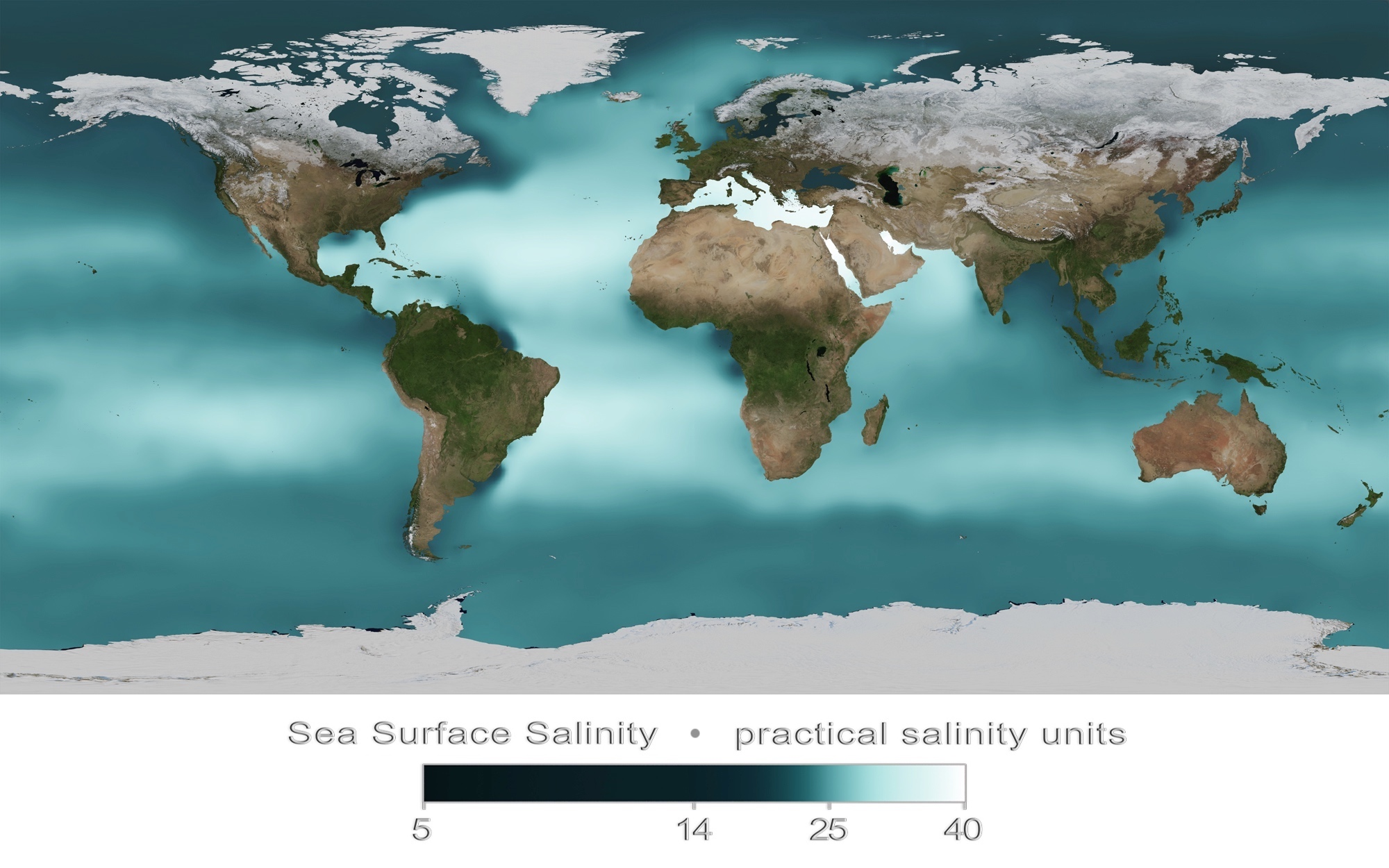
Annual mean sea surface salinity, measured in 2009 in practical salinity units
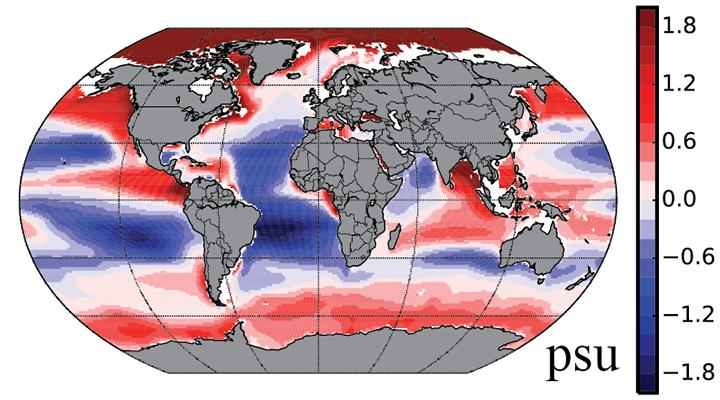
Vertical differences in sea salinity between the surface and a depth of 300 metres. Salinity increases with depth in red regions and decreases in blue regions.

=== Sea spray ===
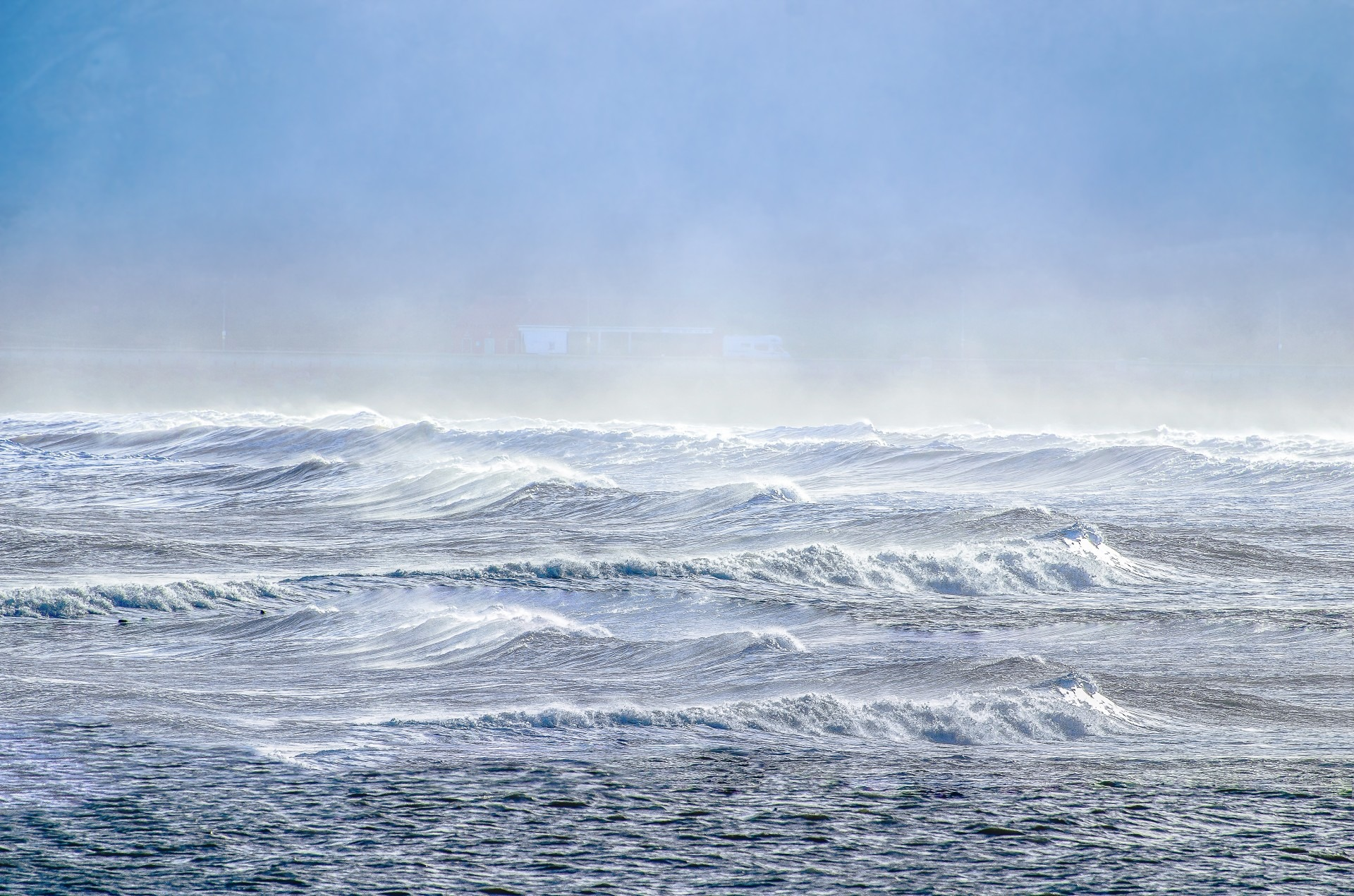
Sea spray containing marine microorganisms, and all the substances and elements contained in their bodies, can be swept high into the atmosphere. There they become aeroplankton and can travel the globe before falling back to Earth.

A stream of airborne microorganisms circles the planet above weather systems but below commercial air lanes. Some peripatetic microorganisms are swept up from terrestrial dust storms, but most originate from marine microorganisms in sea spray. In 2018, scientists reported that hundreds of millions of viruses and tens of millions of bacteria are deposited daily on every square meter around the planet. This is another example of water facilitating the transport of organic material over great distances, in this case in the form of live microorganisms.

Dissolved salt does not evaporate back into the atmosphere like water, but it does form sea salt aerosols in sea spray. Many physical processes over ocean surface generate sea salt aerosols. One common cause is the bursting of air bubbles, which are entrained by the wind stress during the whitecap formation. Another is tearing of drops from wave tops. The total sea salt flux from the ocean to the atmosphere is about 3300 Tg (3.3 billion tonnes) per year.

=== Ocean circulation ===
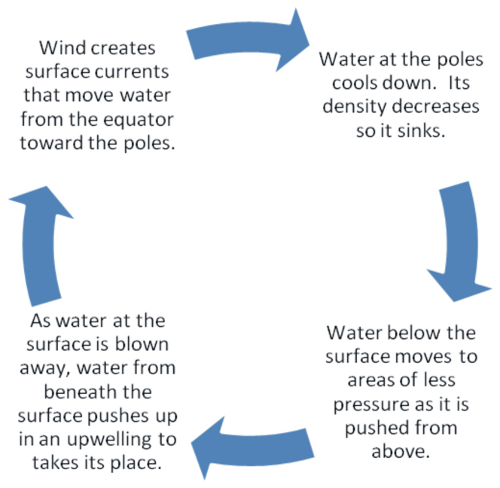
Convection cycle

Upwelling

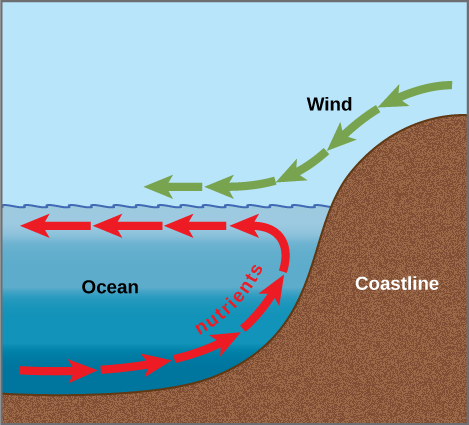
Upwelling caused by an offshore wind in friction with the ocean surface

Upwelling can be caused if an alongshore wind moves towards the equator, inducing Ekman transport

Two mechanisms which result in upwelling. In each case, if the wind direction were reversed it would induce downwelling.
Ventilation of the deep ocean

Antarctic bottom water

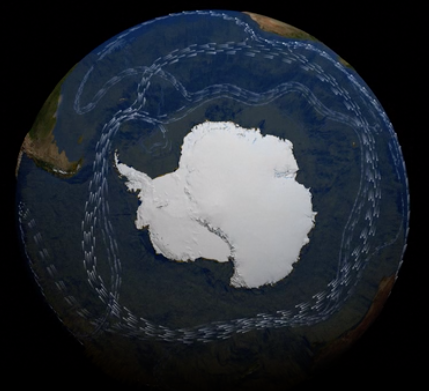
Antarctic Circumpolar Current, with branches connecting to the global conveyor belt

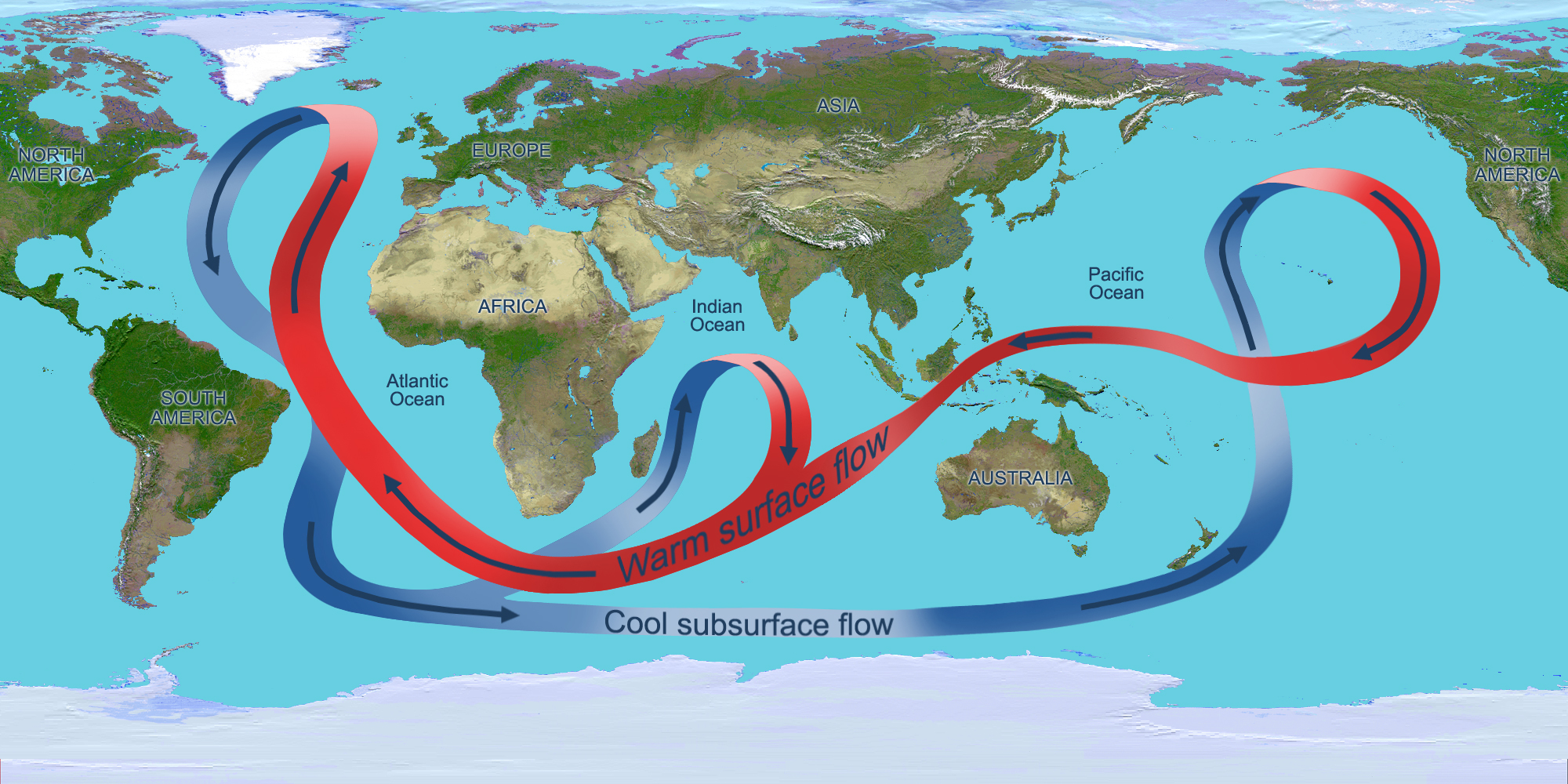
Global conveyor belt

Solar radiation affects the oceans: warm water from the Equator tends to circulate toward the poles, while cold polar water heads towards the Equator. The surface currents are initially dictated by surface wind conditions. The trade winds blow westward in the tropics, and the westerlies blow eastward at mid-latitudes. This wind pattern applies a stress to the subtropical ocean surface with negative curl across the Northern Hemisphere, and the reverse across the Southern Hemisphere. The resulting Sverdrup transport is equatorward. Because of conservation of potential vorticity caused by the poleward-moving winds on the subtropical ridge's western periphery and the increased relative vorticity of poleward moving water, transport is balanced by a narrow, accelerating poleward current, which flows along the western boundary of the ocean basin, outweighing the effects of friction with the cold western boundary current which originates from high latitudes. The overall process, known as western intensification, causes currents on the western boundary of an ocean basin to be stronger than those on the eastern boundary.

As it travels poleward, warm water transported by strong warm water current undergoes evaporative cooling. The cooling is wind driven: wind moving over water cools the water and also causes evaporation, leaving a saltier brine. In this process, the water becomes saltier and denser. and decreases in temperature. Once sea ice forms, salts are left out of the ice, a process known as brine exclusion. These two processes produce water that is denser and colder. The water across the northern Atlantic Ocean becomes so dense that it begins to sink down through less salty and less dense water. This downdraft of heavy, cold and dense water becomes a part of the North Atlantic Deep Water, a southgoing stream.

Winds drive ocean currents in the upper 100 meters of the ocean's surface. However, ocean currents also flow thousands of meters below the surface. These deep-ocean currents are driven by differences in the water's density, which is controlled by temperature (thermo) and salinity (haline). This process is known as thermohaline circulation. In the Earth's polar regions ocean water gets very cold, forming sea ice. As a consequence the surrounding seawater gets saltier, because when sea ice forms, the salt is left behind. As the seawater gets saltier, its density increases, and it starts to sink. Surface water is pulled in to replace the sinking water, which in turn eventually becomes cold and salty enough to sink. This initiates the deep-ocean currents driving the global conveyor belt.

Thermohaline circulation drives a global-scale system of currents called the "global conveyor belt." The conveyor belt begins on the surface of the ocean near the pole in the North Atlantic. Here, the water is chilled by Arctic temperatures. It also gets saltier because when sea ice forms, the salt does not freeze and is left behind in the surrounding water. The cold water is now more dense, due to the added salts, and sinks toward the ocean bottom. Surface water moves in to replace the sinking water, thus creating a current. This deep water moves south, between the continents, past the equator, and down to the ends of Africa and South America. The current travels around the edge of Antarctica, where the water cools and sinks again, as it does in the North Atlantic. Thus, the conveyor belt gets "recharged." As it moves around Antarctica, two sections split off the conveyor and turn northward. One section moves into the Indian Ocean, the other into the Pacific Ocean. These two sections that split off warm up and become less dense as they travel northward toward the equator, so that they rise to the surface (upwelling). They then loop back southward and westward to the South Atlantic, eventually returning to the North Atlantic, where the cycle begins again. The conveyor belt moves at much slower speeds (a few centimeters per second) than wind-driven or tidal currents (tens to hundreds of centimeters per second). It is estimated that any given cubic meter of water takes about 1,000 years to complete the journey along the global conveyor belt. In addition, the conveyor moves an immense volume of water—more than 100 times the flow of the Amazon River (Ross, 1995). The conveyor belt is also a vital component of the global ocean nutrient and carbon dioxide cycles. Warm surface waters are depleted of nutrients and carbon dioxide, but they are enriched again as they travel through the conveyor belt as deep or bottom layers. The base of the world's food chain depends on the cool, nutrient-rich waters that support the growth of algae and seaweed.

Average reservoir residence times
Reservoir	Average residence time
Antarctica	20,000 years
Oceans	3,200 years
Glaciers	20 to 100 years
Seasonal snow cover	2 to 6 months
Soil moisture	1 to 2 months
Groundwater: shallow	100 to 200 years
Groundwater: deep	10,000 years
Lakes (see lake retention time)	50 to 100 years
Rivers	2 to 6 months
Atmosphere	9 days

The global average residence time of a water molecule in the ocean is about 3,200 years. By comparison the average residence time in the atmosphere is about nine days. If it is frozen in the Antarctic or drawn into deep groundwater it can be sequestered for ten thousand years.

== Cycling of key elements ==
Some key elements involved in marine biogeochemical cycles
Element	Diagram	Description
Carbon		The marine carbon cycle involves processes that exchange carbon between various pools within the ocean as well as between the atmosphere, Earth interior, and the seafloor. The carbon cycle is a result of many interacting forces across multiple time and space scales that circulates carbon around the planet, ensuring that carbon is available globally. The marine carbon cycle is a central to the global carbon cycle and contains both inorganic carbon (carbon not associated with a living thing, such as carbon dioxide) and organic carbon (carbon that is, or has been, incorporated into a living thing). Part of the marine carbon cycle transforms carbon between non-living and living matter. Three main processes (or pumps) that make up the marine carbon cycle bring atmospheric carbon dioxide (CO_{2}) into the ocean interior and distribute it through the oceans. These three pumps are: (1) the solubility pump, (2) the carbonate pump, and (3) the biological pump. The total active pool of carbon at the Earth's surface for durations of less than 10,000 years is roughly 40,000 gigatons C (Gt C, a gigaton is one billion tons, or the weight of approximately 6 million blue whales), and about 95% (~38,000 Gt C) is stored in the ocean, mostly as dissolved inorganic carbon. The speciation of dissolved inorganic carbon in the marine carbon cycle is a primary controller of acid-base chemistry in the oceans.
Oxygen		The oxygen cycle involves biogeochemical transitions of oxygen atoms between different oxidation states in ions, oxides, and molecules through redox reactions within and between the spheres/reservoirs of the planet Earth. The word oxygen in the literature typically refers to molecular oxygen (O_{2}) since it is the common product or reactant of many biogeochemical redox reactions within the cycle. Processes within the oxygen cycle are considered to be biological or geological and are evaluated as either a source (O_{2} production) or sink (O_{2} consumption).
Hydrogen		The hydrogen cycle consists of hydrogen exchanges between biotic (living) and abiotic (non-living) sources and sinks of hydrogen-containing compounds. Hydrogen (H) is the most abundant element in the universe. On Earth, common H-containing inorganic molecules include water (H_{2}O), hydrogen gas (H_{2}), methane (CH_{4}), hydrogen sulfide (H_{2}S), and ammonia (NH_{3}). Many organic compounds also contain H atoms, such as hydrocarbons and organic matter. Given the ubiquity of hydrogen atoms in inorganic and organic chemical compounds, the hydrogen cycle is focused on molecular hydrogen (H_{2}).
Nitrogen		The nitrogen cycle is the process by which nitrogen is converted into multiple chemical forms as it circulates among atmosphere, terrestrial, and marine ecosystems. The conversion of nitrogen can be carried out through both biological and physical processes. Important processes in the nitrogen cycle include fixation, ammonification, nitrification, and denitrification. 78% of the Earth's atmosphere is molecular nitrogen (N_{2}), making it the largest source of nitrogen. However, atmospheric nitrogen has limited availability for biological use, leading to a scarcity of usable nitrogen in many types of ecosystems. The nitrogen cycle is of particular interest to ecologists because nitrogen availability can affect the rate of key ecosystem processes, including primary production and decomposition. Human activities such as fossil fuel combustion, use of artificial nitrogen fertilizers, and release of nitrogen in wastewater have dramatically altered the global nitrogen cycle. Human modification of the global nitrogen cycle can negatively affect the natural environment system and also human health.
Phosphorus		The phosphorus cycle is the movement of phosphorus through the lithosphere, hydrosphere, and biosphere. Unlike many other biogeochemical cycles, the atmosphere does not play a significant role in the movement of phosphorus, because phosphorus and phosphorus-based compounds are usually solids at the typical ranges of temperature and pressure found on Earth. The production of phosphine gas occurs in only specialized, local conditions. Therefore, the phosphorus cycle should be viewed from whole Earth system and then specifically focused on the cycle in terrestrial and aquatic systems. Locally, transformations of phosphorus are chemical, biological and microbiological: the major long-term transfers in the global cycle, however, are driven by tectonic movements in geologic time. Humans have caused major changes to the global phosphorus cycle through shipping of phosphorus minerals, and use of phosphorus fertilizer, and also the shipping of food from farms to cities, where it is lost as effluent.
Sulphur		The sulfur cycle is the collection of processes by which sulfur moves between rocks, waterways and living systems. Such biogeochemical cycles are important in geology because they affect many minerals. Biochemical cycles are also important for life because sulfur is an essential element, being a constituent of many proteins and cofactors, and sulfur compounds can be used as oxidants or reductants in microbial respiration. The global sulfur cycle involves the transformations of sulfur species through different oxidation states, which play an important role in both geological and biological processes. Earth's main sulfur sink is the oceans SO_{4}^{2−}, where it is the major oxidizing agent.
Iron		The iron cycle (Fe) is the biogeochemical cycle of iron through the atmosphere, hydrosphere, biosphere and lithosphere. While Fe is highly abundant in the Earth's crust, it is less common in oxygenated surface waters. Iron is a key micronutrient in primary productivity, and a limiting nutrient in the Southern ocean, eastern equatorial Pacific, and the subarctic Pacific referred to as High-Nutrient, Low-Chlorophyll (HNLC) regions of the ocean. Iron exists in a range of oxidation states from -2 to +7; however, on Earth it is predominantly in its +2 or +3 redox state and is a primary redox-active metal on Earth. The cycling of iron between its +2 and +3 oxidation states is referred to as the iron cycle. This process can be entirely abiotic or facilitated by microorganisms, especially iron-oxidizing bacteria. The abiotic processes include the rusting of iron-bearing metals, where Fe^{2+} is abiotically oxidized to Fe^{3+} in the presence of oxygen, and the reduction of Fe^{3+} to Fe^{2+} by iron-sulfide minerals. The biological cycling of Fe^{2+} is done by iron oxidizing and reducing microbes.
Calcium		The calcium cycle is a transfer of calcium between dissolved and solid phases. There is a continuous supply of calcium ions into waterways from rocks, organisms, and soils. Calcium ions are consumed and removed from aqueous environments as they react to form insoluble structures such as calcium carbonate and calcium silicate, which can deposit to form sediments or the exoskeletons of organisms. Calcium ions can also be utilized biologically, as calcium is essential to biological functions such as the production of bones and teeth or cellular function. The calcium cycle is a common thread between terrestrial, marine, geological, and biological processes. The marine calcium cycle is affected by changing atmospheric carbon dioxide due to ocean acidification.
Silicon		The silica cycle involves the transport of silica between the Earth's systems. Opal silica (SiO_{2}), also called silicon dioxide, is a chemical compound of silicon. Silicon is a bioessential element and is one of the most abundant elements on Earth. The silica cycle has significant overlap with the carbon cycle (see the carbonate–silicate cycle) and plays an important role in the sequestration of carbon through continental weathering, biogenic export and burial as oozes on geologic timescales.

== Box models ==
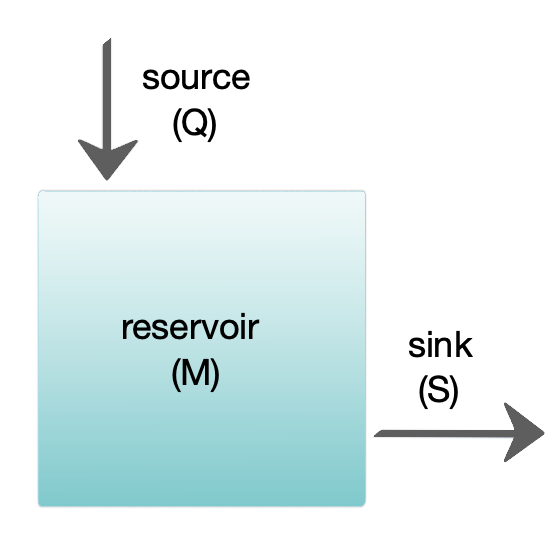
Basic one-box model Box models are widely used to illustrate fluxes in biogeochemical cycles

Box models are widely used to model biogeochemical systems. Box models are simplified versions of complex systems, reducing them to boxes (or storage reservoirs) for chemical materials, linked by material fluxes (flows). Simple box models have a small number of boxes with properties, such as volume, that do not change with time. The boxes are assumed to behave as if they were mixed homogeneously. These models are often used to derive analytical formulas describing the dynamics and steady-state abundance of the chemical species involved.

The diagram at the right shows a basic one-box model. The reservoir contains the amount of material M under consideration, as defined by chemical, physical or biological properties. The source Q is the flux of material into the reservoir, and the sink S is the flux of material out of the reservoir. The budget is the check and balance of the sources and sinks affecting material turnover in a reservoir. The reservoir is in a steady state if Q = S, that is, if the sources balance the sinks and there is no change over time.

Measurement units

Global biogeochemical box models usually measure:
— reservoir masses in petagrams (Pg)
— flow fluxes in petagrams per year (Pg yr^{−1})
Diagrams in this article mostly use these units

one petagram = 10^{15} grams = one gigatonne = one billion (10^{9}) tonnes

The turnover time (also called the renewal time or exit age) is the average time material spends resident in the reservoir. If the reservoir is in a steady state, this is the same as the time it takes to fill or drain the reservoir. Thus, if τ is the turnover time, then τ = M/S. The equation describing the rate of change of content in a reservoir is

$$\frac{dM}{dt} = Q - S = Q - \frac{M}{\tau}$$

When two or more reservoirs are connected, the material can be regarded as cycling between the reservoirs, and there can be predictable patterns to the cyclic flow. More complex multibox models are usually solved using numerical techniques.

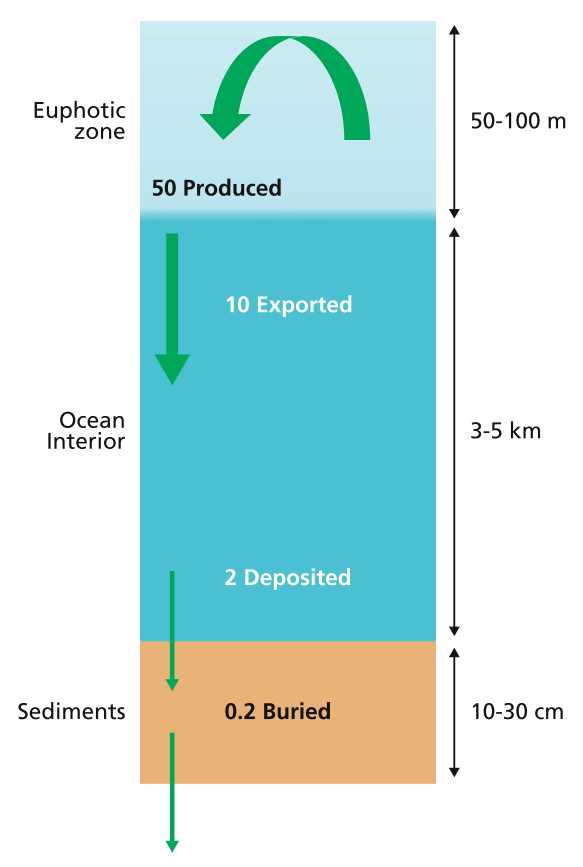
Simplified budget of ocean carbon flows example of a three box model

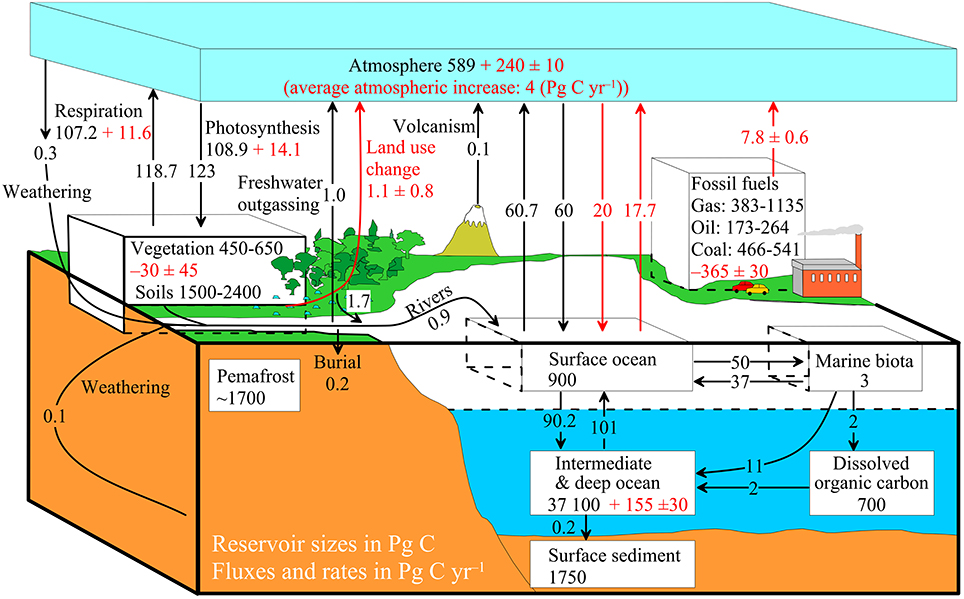
Export and burial rates of terrestrial organic carbon in the ocean example of a more complex model with many interacting boxes Reservoir masses here represents carbon stocks, measured in Pg C. Carbon exchange fluxes, measured in Pg C yr^{−1}, occur between the atmosphere and its two major sinks, the land and the ocean. The black numbers and arrows indicate the reservoir mass and exchange fluxes estimated for the year 1750, just before the Industrial Revolution. The red arrows (and associated numbers) indicate the annual flux changes due to anthropogenic activities, averaged over the 2000–2009 time period. They represent how the carbon cycle has changed since 1750. Red numbers in the reservoirs represent the cumulative changes in anthropogenic carbon since the start of the Industrial Period, 1750–2011.

The diagram above shows a simplified budget of ocean carbon flows. It is composed of three simple interconnected box models, one for the euphotic zone, one for the ocean interior or dark ocean, and one for ocean sediments. In the euphotic zone, net phytoplankton production is about 50 Pg C each year. About 10 Pg is exported to the ocean interior while the other 40 Pg is respired. Organic carbon degradation occurs as particles (marine snow) settle through the ocean interior. Only 2 Pg eventually arrives at the seafloor, while the other 8 Pg is respired in the dark ocean. In sediments, the time scale available for degradation increases by orders of magnitude with the result that 90% of the organic carbon delivered is degraded and only 0.2 Pg C yr^{−1} is eventually buried and transferred from the biosphere to the geosphere.

== Dissolved and particulate matter ==
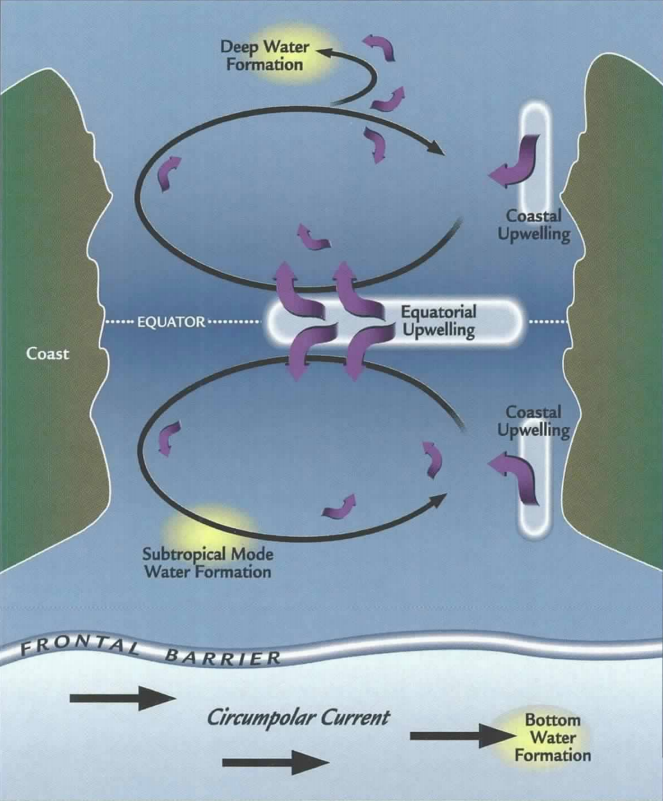
DOC net production, transport and export in the ocean Regions of significant net DOC production (broad arrows) include coastal and equatorial upwelling regions that support much of the global new production. DOC is transported into and around the subtropical gyres with the wind-driven surface circulation. Export takes place if exportable DOC (elevated concentrations indicated by dark blue fields) is present during overturning of the water column. precursor for deep and intermediate water mass formation. DOC is also exported with subduction in the gyres. In regions where DOCenriched subtropical water is prevented by polar frontal systems from serving as a precursor for overturning circulation (such as at the sites of Antarctic Bottom Water formation in the Southern Ocean) DOC export is a weak component of the biological pump. Waters south of the Antarctic Polar Front lack significant exportable DOC (depicted by light blue field) during winter.

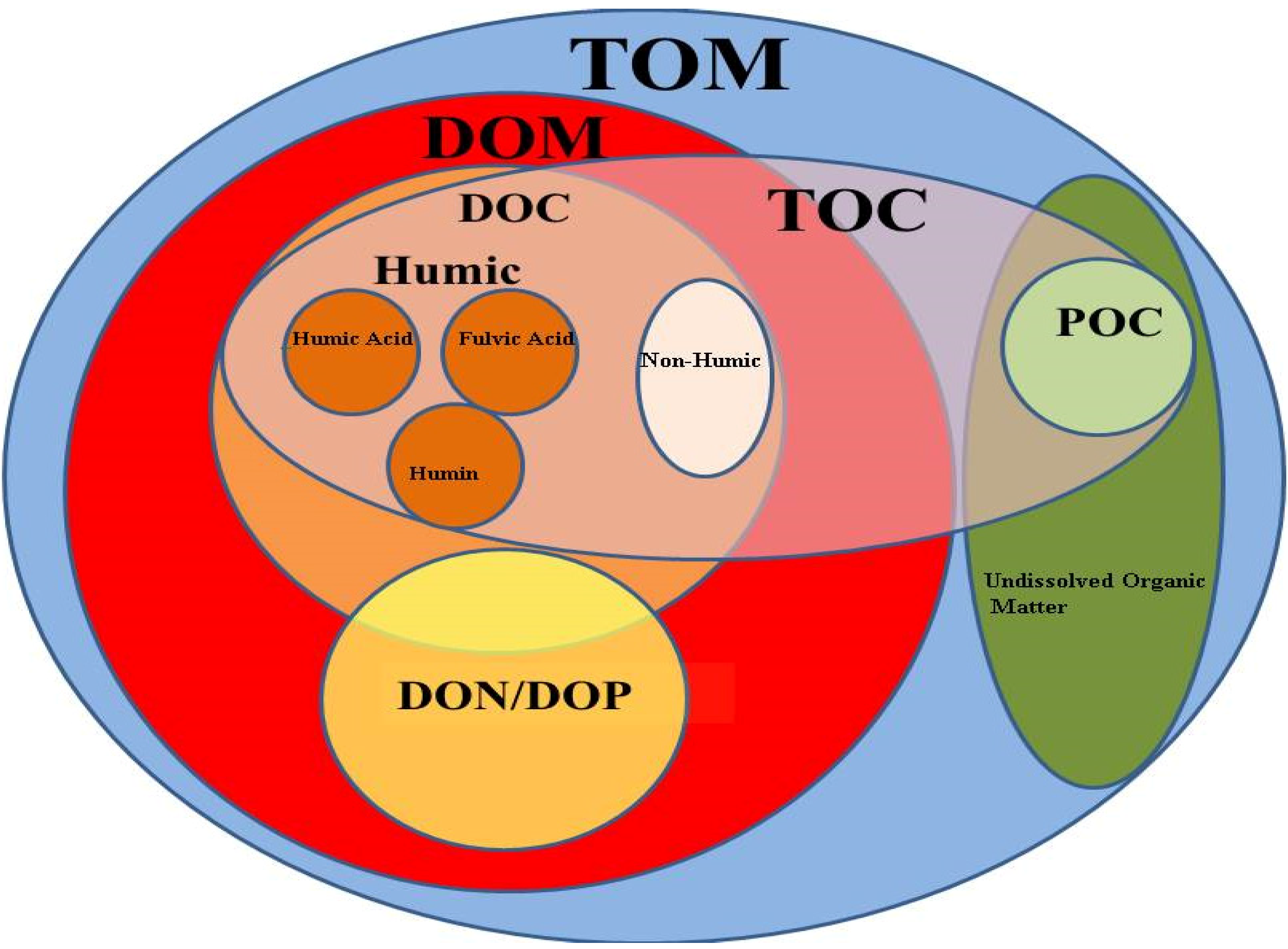
Dissolved organic matter (DOM) Venn diagram of various forms of dissolved organic matter (DOM) found in water. Total organic matter (TOM), total organic carbon (TOC), dissolved organic carbon (DOC), particulate organic carbon (POC), dissolved organic nitrogen (DON), and dissolved organic phosphorus (DOP) are represented. DOC can be further broken down to its humic (humic acid, fulvic acid, and humin) and non-humic material.

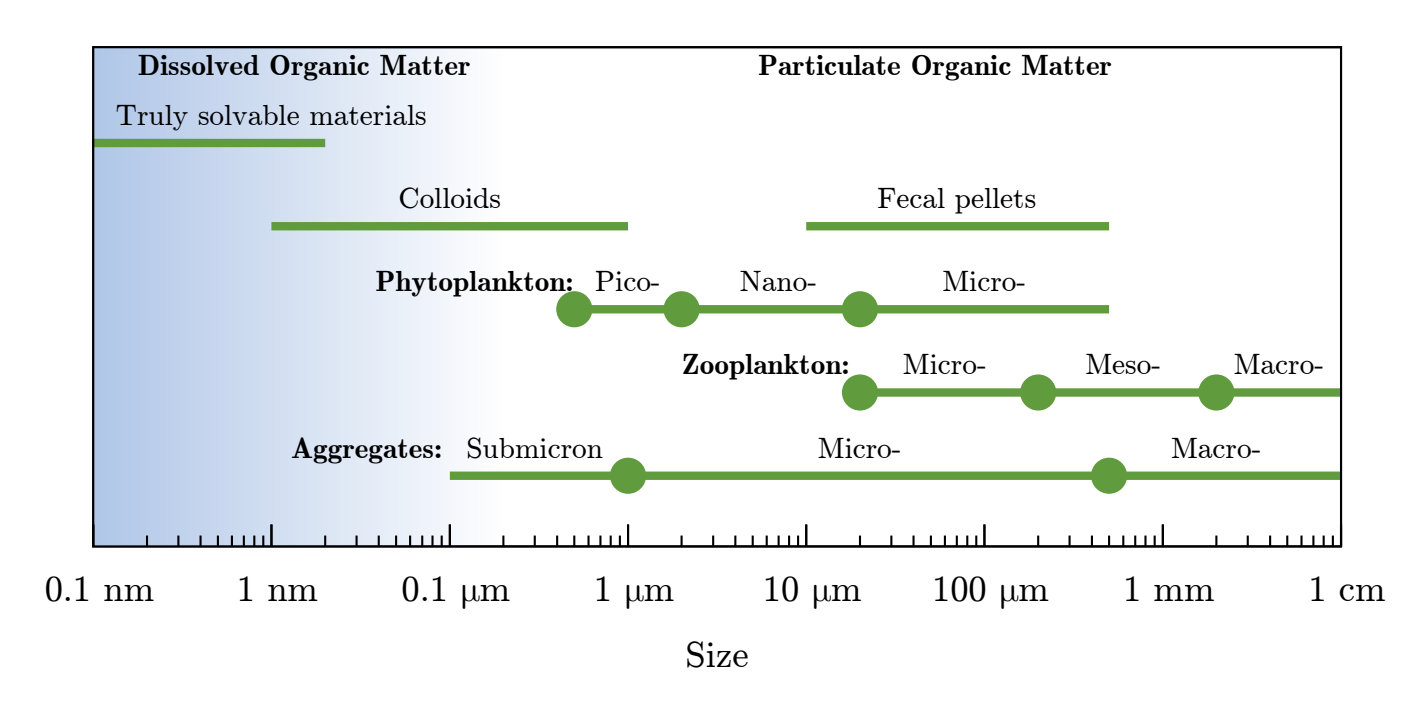
Size and classification of marine particles

== Biological pumps ==
Importance of Antarctic krill in biogeochemical cycles

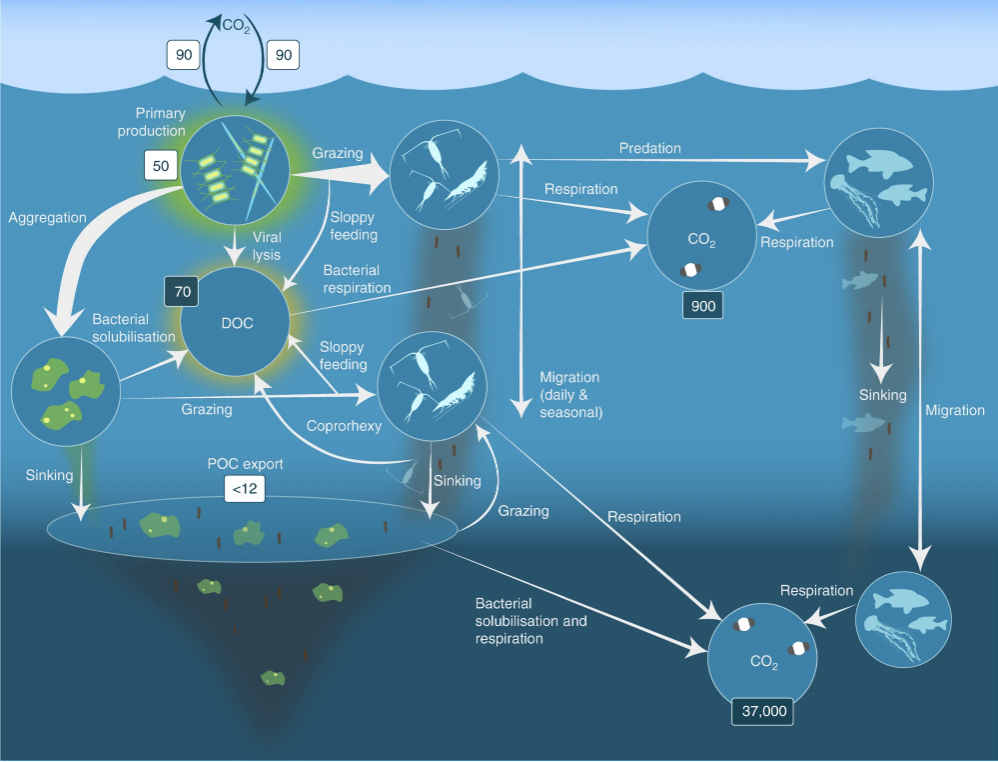
Processes in the biological pump
Numbers given are carbon fluxes (Gt C yr−1) in white boxes
and carbon masses (Gt C) in dark boxes
Phytoplankton convert CO_{2}, which has dissolved from the atmosphere into the surface oceans into particulate organic carbon (POC) during primary production. Phytoplankton are then consumed by krill and small zooplankton grazers, which in turn are preyed upon by higher trophic levels. Any unconsumed phytoplankton form aggregates, and along with zooplankton faecal pellets, sink rapidly and are exported out of the mixed layer. Krill, zooplankton and microbes intercept phytoplankton in the surface ocean and sinking detrital particles at depth, consuming and respiring this POC to CO_{2} (dissolved inorganic carbon, DIC), such that only a small proportion of surface-produced carbon sinks to the deep ocean (i.e., depths > 1000 m). As krill and smaller zooplankton feed, they also physically fragment particles into small, slower- or non-sinking pieces (via sloppy feeding, coprorhexy if fragmenting faeces), retarding POC export. This releases dissolved organic carbon (DOC) either directly from cells or indirectly via bacterial solubilisation (yellow circle around DOC). Bacteria can then remineralise the DOC to DIC (CO_{2}, microbial gardening). Diel vertically migrating krill, smaller zooplankton and fish can actively transport carbon to depth by consuming POC in the surface layer at night, and metabolising it at their daytime, mesopelagic residence depths. Depending on species life history, active transport may occur on a seasonal basis as well.

The biological pump, in its simplest form, is the ocean's biologically driven sequestration of carbon from the atmosphere to the ocean interior and seafloor sediments. It is the part of the oceanic carbon cycle responsible for the cycling of organic matter formed mainly by phytoplankton during photosynthesis (soft-tissue pump), as well as the cycling of calcium carbonate (CaCO_{3}) formed into shells by certain organisms such as plankton and mollusks (carbonate pump).

The biological pump can be divided into three distinct phases, the first of which is the production of fixed carbon by planktonic phototrophs in the euphotic (sunlit) surface region of the ocean. In these surface waters, phytoplankton use carbon dioxide (CO_{2}), nitrogen (N), phosphorus (P), and other trace elements (barium, iron, zinc, etc.) during photosynthesis to make carbohydrates, lipids, and proteins. Some plankton, (e.g. coccolithophores and foraminifera) combine calcium (Ca) and dissolved carbonates (carbonic acid and bicarbonate) to form a calcium carbonate (CaCO_{3}) protective coating.

Biological pump

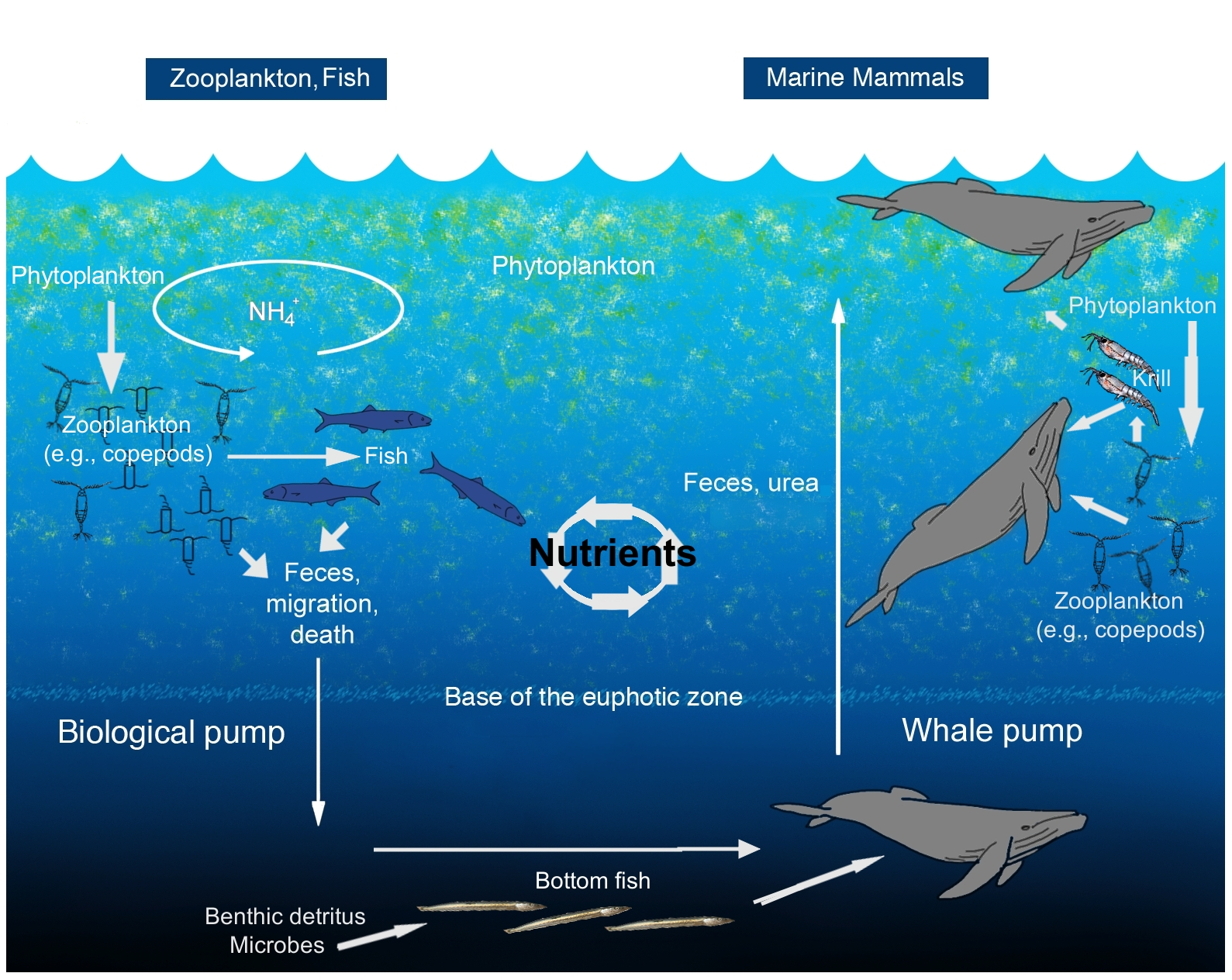
The oceanic whale pump where whales cycle nutrients through the water column

Once this carbon is fixed into soft or hard tissue, the organisms either stay in the euphotic zone to be recycled as part of the regenerative nutrient cycle or once they die, continue to the second phase of the biological pump and begin to sink to the ocean floor. The sinking particles will often form aggregates as they sink, greatly increasing the sinking rate. It is this aggregation that gives particles a better chance of escaping predation and decomposition in the water column and eventually make it to the sea floor.

The fixed carbon that is either decomposed by bacteria on the way down or once on the sea floor then enters the final phase of the pump and is remineralized to be used again in primary production. The particles that escape these processes entirely are sequestered in the sediment and may remain there for millions of years. It is this sequestered carbon that is responsible for ultimately lowering atmospheric CO_{2}.

External videos
- Marine oxygen and carbon dioxide cycles

- Brum JR, Morris JJ, Décima M and Stukel MR (2014) "Mortality in the oceans: Causes and consequences". Eco-DAS IX Symposium Proceedings, Chapter 2, pages 16–48. Association for the Sciences of Limnology and Oceanography. ISBN 978-0-9845591-3-8.
- Mateus, Marcos D. (6 January 2017). "Bridging the Gap between Knowing and Modeling Viruses in Marine Systems—An Upcoming Frontier". Frontiers in Marine Science. 3: 284. Bibcode:2017FrMaS...3..284M. doi:10.3389/fmars.2016.00284.
- Beckett, Stephen J.; Weitz, Joshua S. (15 May 2017). "Disentangling niche competition from grazing mortality in phytoplankton dilution experiments". PLOS ONE. 12 (5) e0177517. Bibcode:2017PLoSO..1277517B. doi:10.1371/journal.pone.0177517. PMC 5432111. PMID 28505212.

== Role of microorganisms ==
DOM, POM and the viral shunt

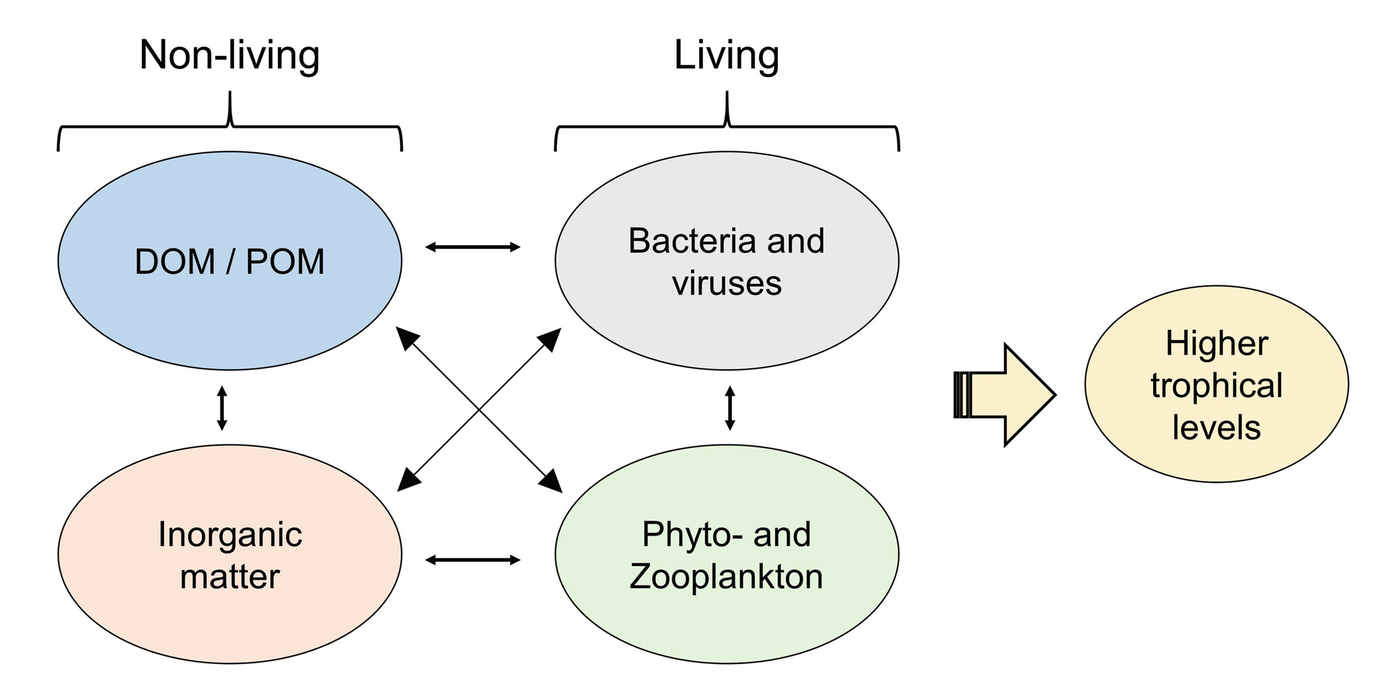
Connections between the different compartments of the living (bacteria/viruses and phyto−/zooplankton) and the nonliving (DOM/POM and inorganic matter) environment

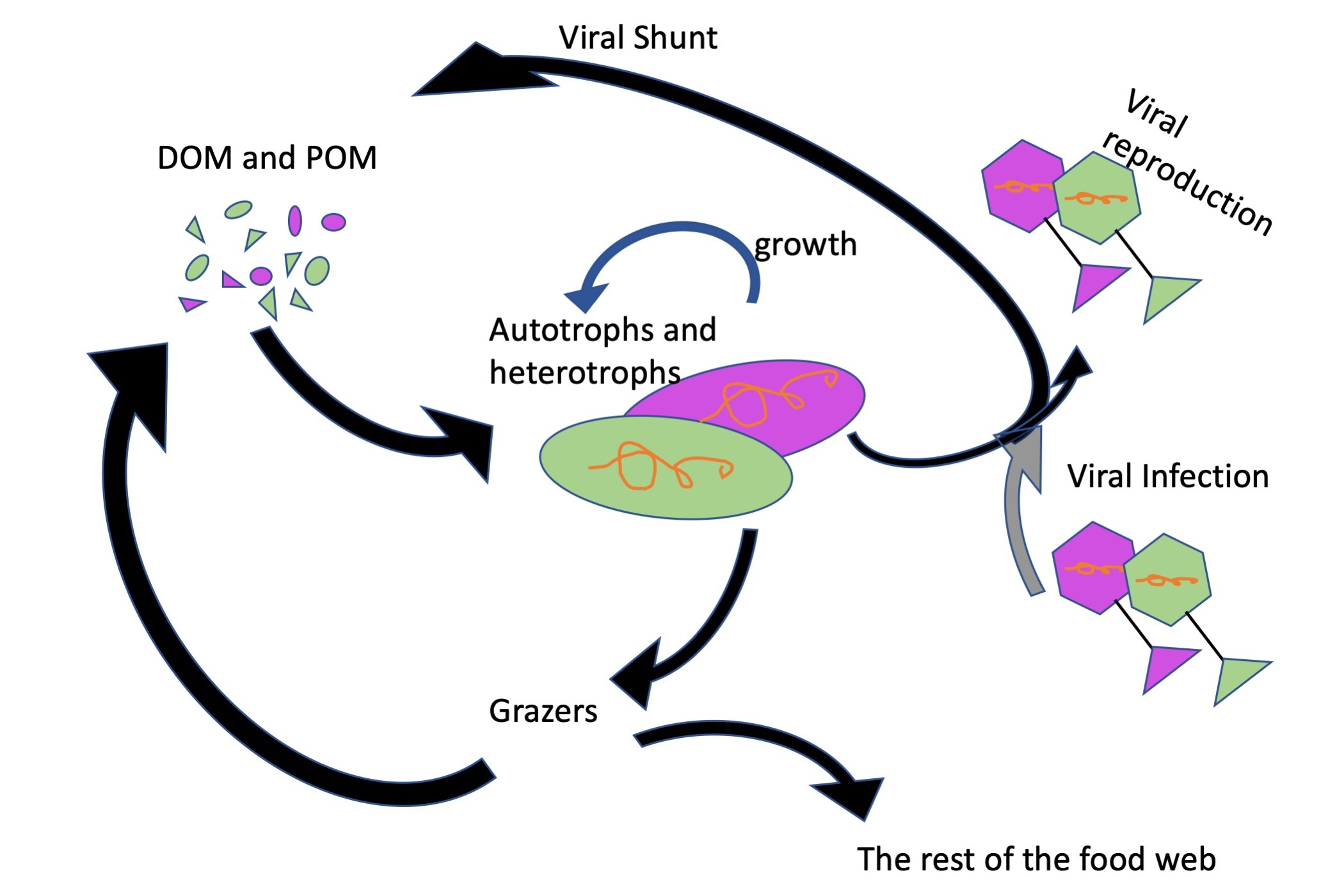
The viral shunt pathway facilitates the flow of dissolved organic matter (DOM) and particulate organic matter (POM) through the marine food web

== Carbon, oxygen and hydrogen cycles ==
The marine carbon cycle is composed of processes that exchange carbon between various pools within the ocean as well as between the atmosphere, Earth interior, and the seafloor. The carbon cycle is a result of many interacting forces across multiple time and space scales that circulates carbon around the planet, ensuring that carbon is available globally. The Oceanic carbon cycle is a central process to the global carbon cycle and contains both inorganic carbon (carbon not associated with a living thing, such as carbon dioxide) and organic carbon (carbon that is, or has been, incorporated into a living thing). Part of the marine carbon cycle transforms carbon between non-living and living matter.

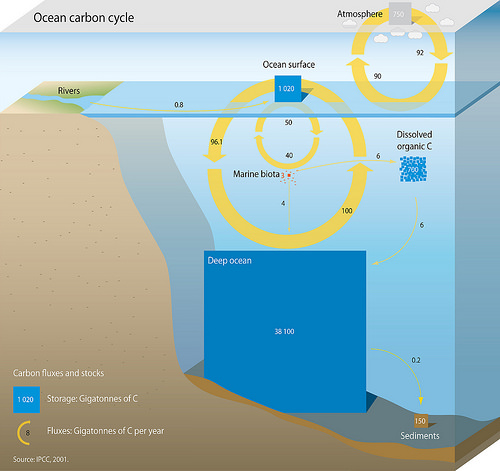
Marine carbon cycle

Oxygen cycle

Three main processes (or pumps) that make up the marine carbon cycle bring atmospheric carbon dioxide (CO_{2}) into the ocean interior and distribute it through the oceans. These three pumps are: (1) the solubility pump, (2) the carbonate pump, and (3) the biological pump. The total active pool of carbon at the Earth's surface for durations of less than 10,000 years is roughly 40,000 gigatons C (Gt C, a gigaton is one billion tons, or the weight of approximately 6 million blue whales), and about 95% (~38,000 Gt C) is stored in the ocean, mostly as dissolved inorganic carbon. The speciation of dissolved inorganic carbon in the marine carbon cycle is a primary controller of acid-base chemistry in the oceans.

Forms of carbon
Carbon form	Chemical formula	State	Main reservoir
carbon dioxide	CO_{2}	gas	atmosphere
carbonic acid	H_{2}CO_{3}	liquid	ocean
bicarbonate ion	HCO_{3}−	liquid (dissolved ion)	ocean
organic compounds	Examples: C_{6}H_{12}O_{6} (glucose); CH_{4} (methane)	solid gas	marine organisms organic sediments (fossil fuels)
other carbon compounds	Examples: CaCO_{3} (calcium carbonate); CaMg(CO_{3})_{2} (calcium magnesium carbonate)	solid	shells sedimentary rock

== Nitrogen and phosphorus cycles ==
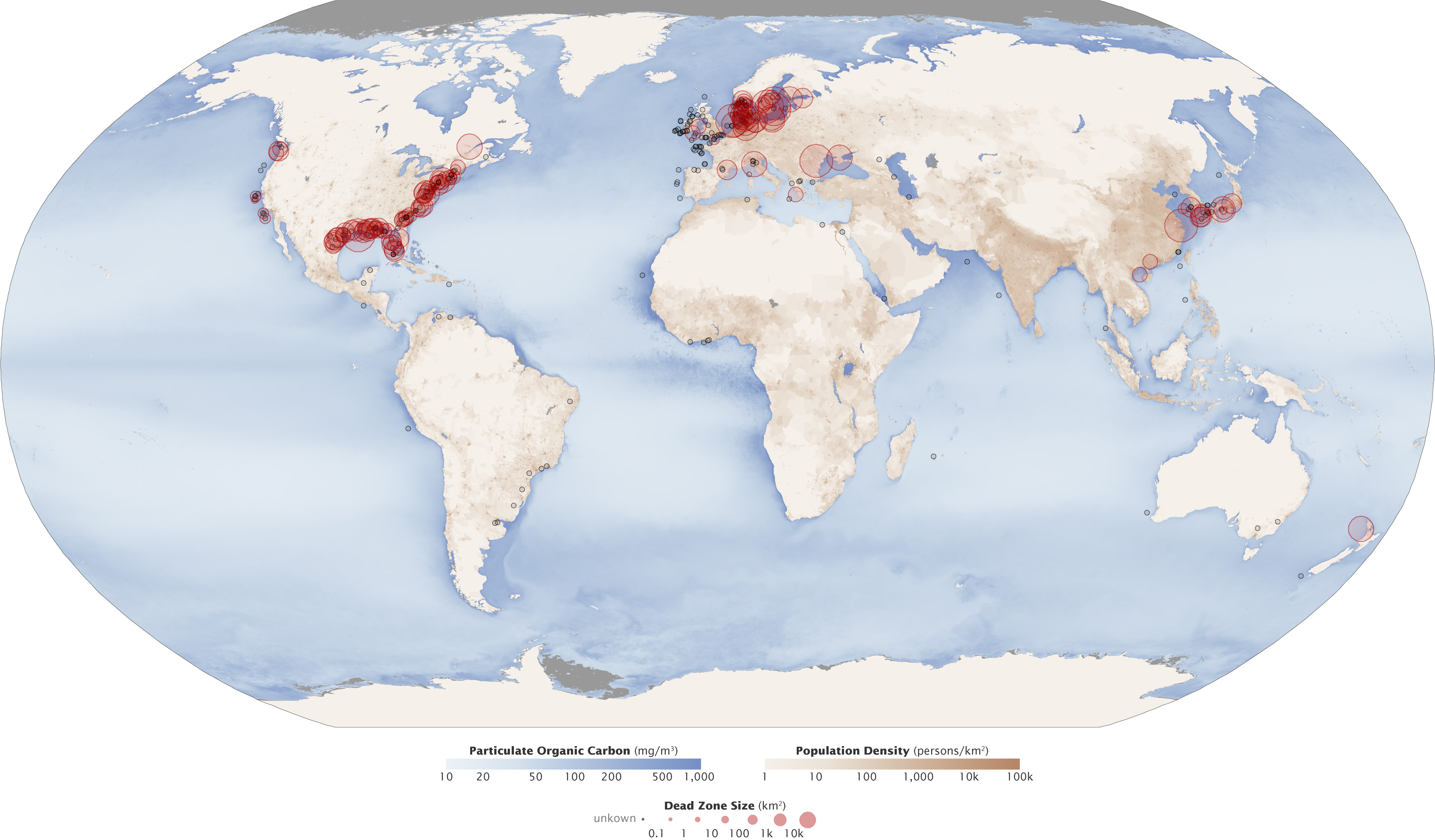
Dead zones occur in the ocean when phosphorus and nitrogen from fertilizers in land runoff cause excessive growth of microorganisms, which depletes oxygen and kills fauna. Worldwide, large dead zones are found in coastal areas with high human population density.

Interactions between marine biogeochemical carbon, nitrogen and phosphorus cycles RDOC: recalcitrant dissolved organic carbon DOM: dissolved organic material POM: particulate organic material

The nitrogen cycle is as important in the ocean as it is on land. While the overall cycle is similar in both cases, there are different players and modes of transfer for nitrogen in the ocean. Nitrogen enters the ocean through precipitation, runoff, or as N_{2} from the atmosphere. Nitrogen cannot be utilized by phytoplankton as N_{2} so it must undergo nitrogen fixation which is performed predominantly by cyanobacteria. Without supplies of fixed nitrogen entering the marine cycle, the fixed nitrogen would be used up in about 2000 years. Phytoplankton need nitrogen in biologically available forms for the initial synthesis of organic matter. Ammonia and urea are released into the water by excretion from plankton. Nitrogen sources are removed from the euphotic zone by the downward movement of the organic matter. This can occur from sinking of phytoplankton, vertical mixing, or sinking of waste of vertical migrators. The sinking results in ammonia being introduced at lower depths below the euphotic zone. Bacteria are able to convert ammonia to nitrite and nitrate but they are inhibited by light so this must occur below the euphotic zone. Ammonification or mineralization is performed by bacteria to convert organic nitrogen to ammonia. Nitrification can then occur to convert the ammonium to nitrite and nitrate. Nitrate can be returned to the euphotic zone by vertical mixing and upwelling where it can be taken up by phytoplankton to continue the cycle. N_{2} can be returned to the atmosphere through denitrification.

Ammonium is thought to be the preferred source of fixed nitrogen for phytoplankton because its assimilation does not involve a redox reaction and therefore requires little energy. Nitrate requires a redox reaction for assimilation but is more abundant so most phytoplankton have adapted to have the enzymes necessary to undertake this reduction (nitrate reductase). There are a few notable and well-known exceptions that include most Prochlorococcus and some Synechococcus that can only take up nitrogen as ammonium.

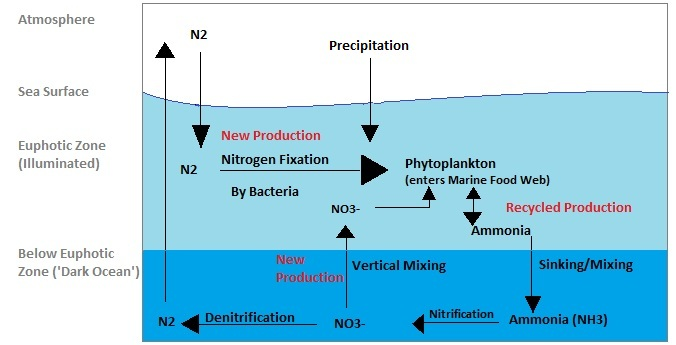
Marine nitrogen cycle

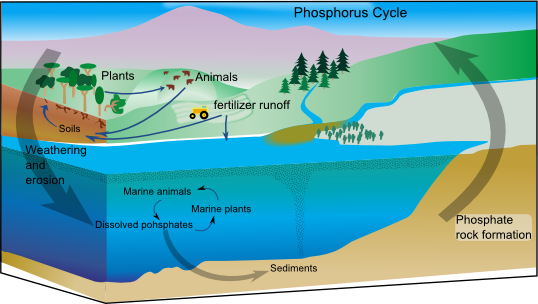
Marine phosphorus cycle

Phosphorus is an essential nutrient for plants and animals. Phosphorus is a limiting nutrient for aquatic organisms. Phosphorus forms parts of important life-sustaining molecules that are very common in the biosphere. Phosphorus does enter the atmosphere in very small amounts when the dust is dissolved in rainwater and seaspray but remains mostly on land and in rock and soil minerals. Eighty per cent of the mined phosphorus is used to make fertilizers. Phosphates from fertilizers, sewage and detergents can cause pollution in lakes and streams. Over-enrichment of phosphate in both fresh and inshore marine waters can lead to massive algae blooms which, when they die and decay leads to eutrophication of freshwaters only. Recent research suggests that the predominant pollutant responsible for algal blooms in saltwater estuaries and coastal marine habitats is nitrogen.

Phosphorus occurs most abundantly in nature as part of the orthophosphate ion (PO_{4})^{3−}, consisting of a P atom and 4 oxygen atoms. On land most phosphorus is found in rocks and minerals. Phosphorus-rich deposits have generally formed in the ocean or from guano, and over time, geologic processes bring ocean sediments to land. Weathering of rocks and minerals release phosphorus in a soluble form where it is taken up by plants, and it is transformed into organic compounds. The plants may then be consumed by herbivores and the phosphorus is either incorporated into their tissues or excreted. After death, the animal or plant decays, and phosphorus is returned to the soil where a large part of the phosphorus is transformed into insoluble compounds. Runoff may carry a small part of the phosphorus back to the ocean.

== Nutrient cycle ==
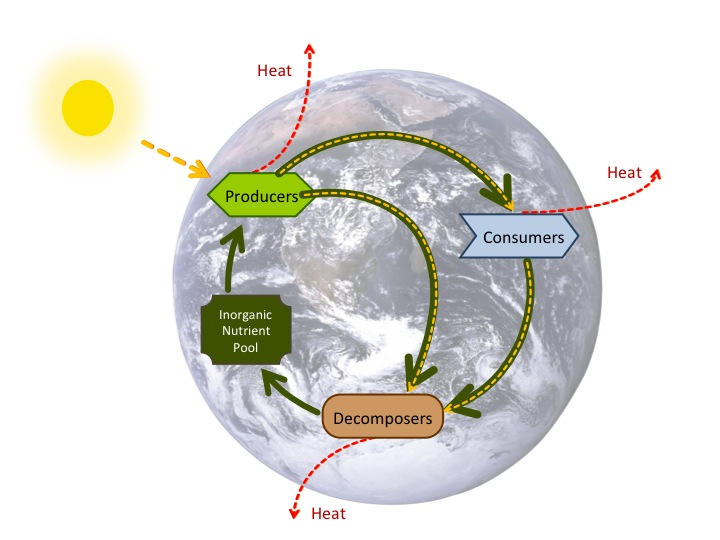
Flow of energy and cycling of nutrients Dark green lines represent movement of nutrients and dashed lines represent movement of energy. Nutrients remain within the system while energy enters via photosynthesis and leaves the system primarily as heat energy, a non-biologically useful form of energy.

A nutrient cycle is the movement and exchange of organic and inorganic matter back into the production of matter. The process is regulated by the pathways available in marine food webs, which ultimately decompose organic matter back into inorganic nutrients. Nutrient cycles occur within ecosystems. Energy flow always follows a unidirectional and noncyclic path, whereas the movement of mineral nutrients is cyclic. Mineral cycles include the carbon cycle, oxygen cycle, nitrogen cycle, phosphorus cycle and sulfur cycle among others that continually recycle along with other mineral nutrients into productive ecological nutrition.

There is considerable overlap between the terms for the biogeochemical cycle and nutrient cycle. Some textbooks integrate the two and seem to treat them as synonymous terms. However, the terms often appear independently. Nutrient cycle is more often used in direct reference to the idea of an intra-system cycle, where an ecosystem functions as a unit. From a practical point, it does not make sense to assess a terrestrial ecosystem by considering the full column of air above it as well as the great depths of Earth below it. While an ecosystem often has no clear boundary, as a working model it is practical to consider the functional community where the bulk of matter and energy transfer occurs. Nutrient cycling occurs in ecosystems that participate in the "larger biogeochemical cycles of the earth through a system of inputs and outputs."

=== Dissolved nutrients ===
Nutrients dissolved in seawater are essential for the survival of marine life. Nitrogen and phosphorus are particularly important. They are regarded as limiting nutrients in many marine environments, because primary producers, like algae and marine plants, cannot grow without them. They are critical for stimulating primary production by phytoplankton. Other important nutrients are silicon, iron, and zinc.

The process of cycling nutrients in the sea starts with biological pumping, when nutrients are extracted from surface waters by phytoplankton to become part of their organic makeup. Phytoplankton are either eaten by other organisms, or eventually die and drift down as marine snow. There they decay and return to the dissolved state, but at greater ocean depths. The fertility of the oceans depends on the abundance of the nutrients, and is measured by the primary production, which is the rate of fixation of carbon per unit of water per unit time. "Primary production is often mapped by satellites using the distribution of chlorophyll, which is a pigment produced by plants that absorbs energy during photosynthesis. The distribution of chlorophyll is shown in the figure above. You can see the highest abundance close to the coastlines where nutrients from the land are fed in by rivers. The other location where chlorophyll levels are high is in upwelling zones where nutrients are brought to the surface ocean from depth by the upwelling process..."

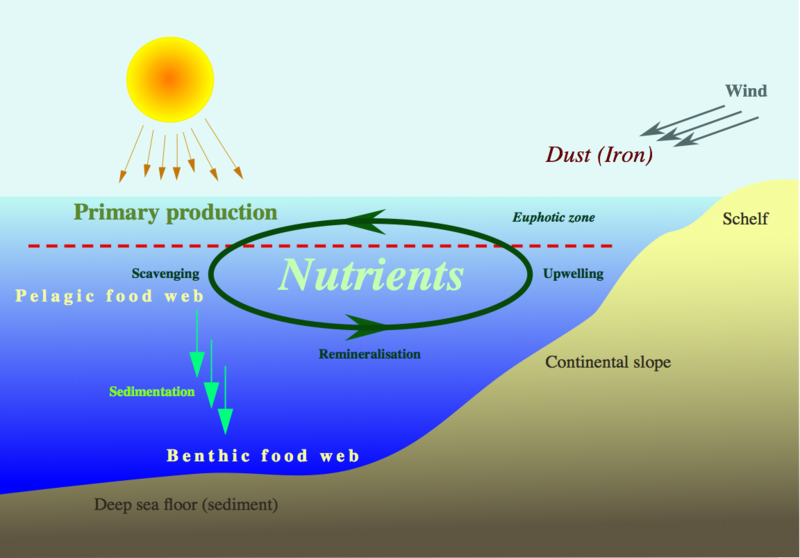
Ocean nutrient cycle

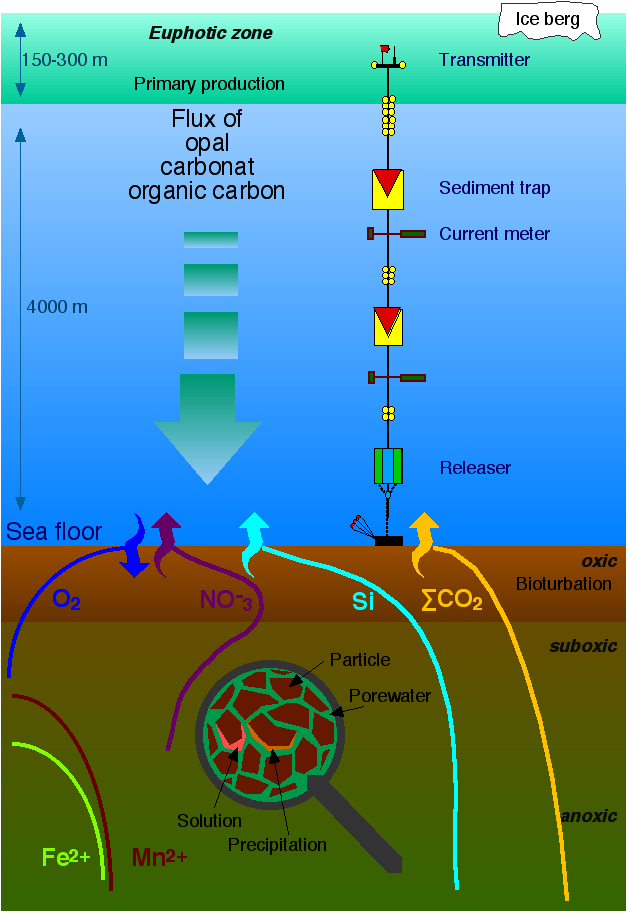
Ocean nutrient flux

Land runoff drains nutrients and pollutants to the ocean

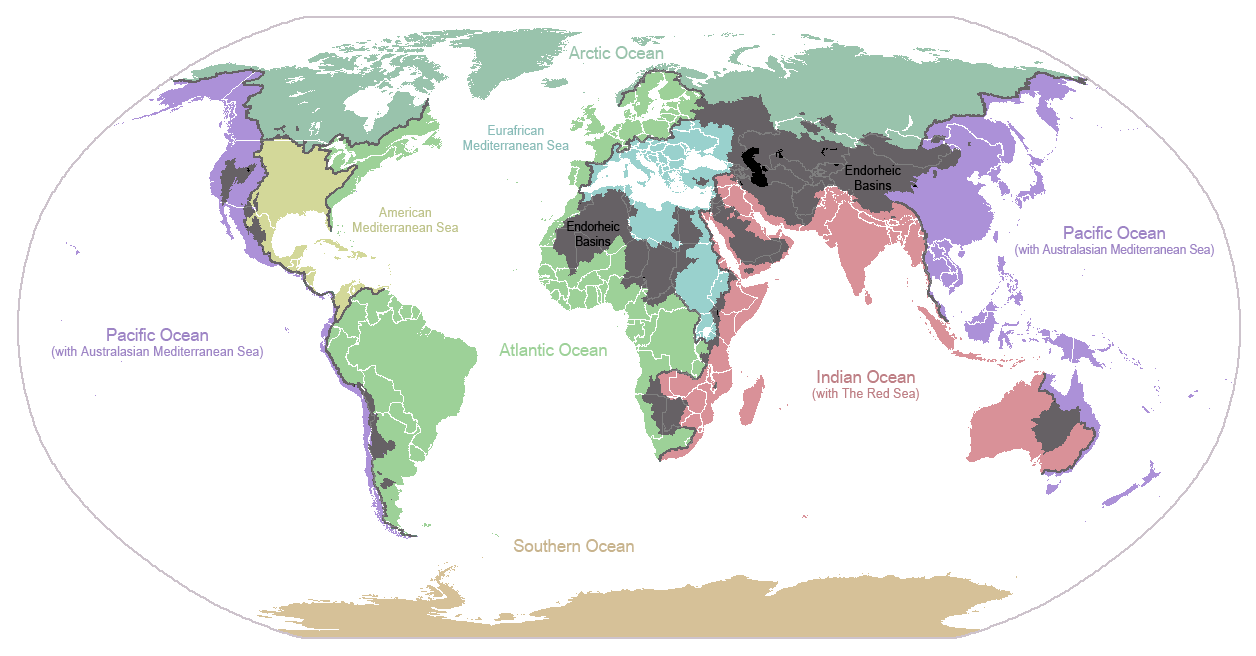
The drainage basins of the principal oceans and seas of the world are marked by continental divides. The grey areas are endorheic basins that do not drain to the ocean.

"Another critical element for the health of the oceans is the dissolved oxygen content. Oxygen in the surface ocean is continuously added across the air-sea interface as well as by photosynthesis; it is used up in respiration by marine organisms and during the decay or oxidation of organic material that rains down in the ocean and is deposited on the ocean bottom. Most organisms require oxygen, thus its depletion has adverse effects for marine populations. Temperature also affects oxygen levels as warm waters can hold less dissolved oxygen than cold waters. This relationship will have major implications for future oceans, as we will see... The final seawater property we will consider is the content of dissolved CO_{2}. CO_{2} is nearly opposite to oxygen in many chemical and biological processes; it is used up by plankton during photosynthesis and replenished during respiration as well as during the oxidation of organic matter. As we will see later, CO_{2} content has importance for the study of deep-water aging."

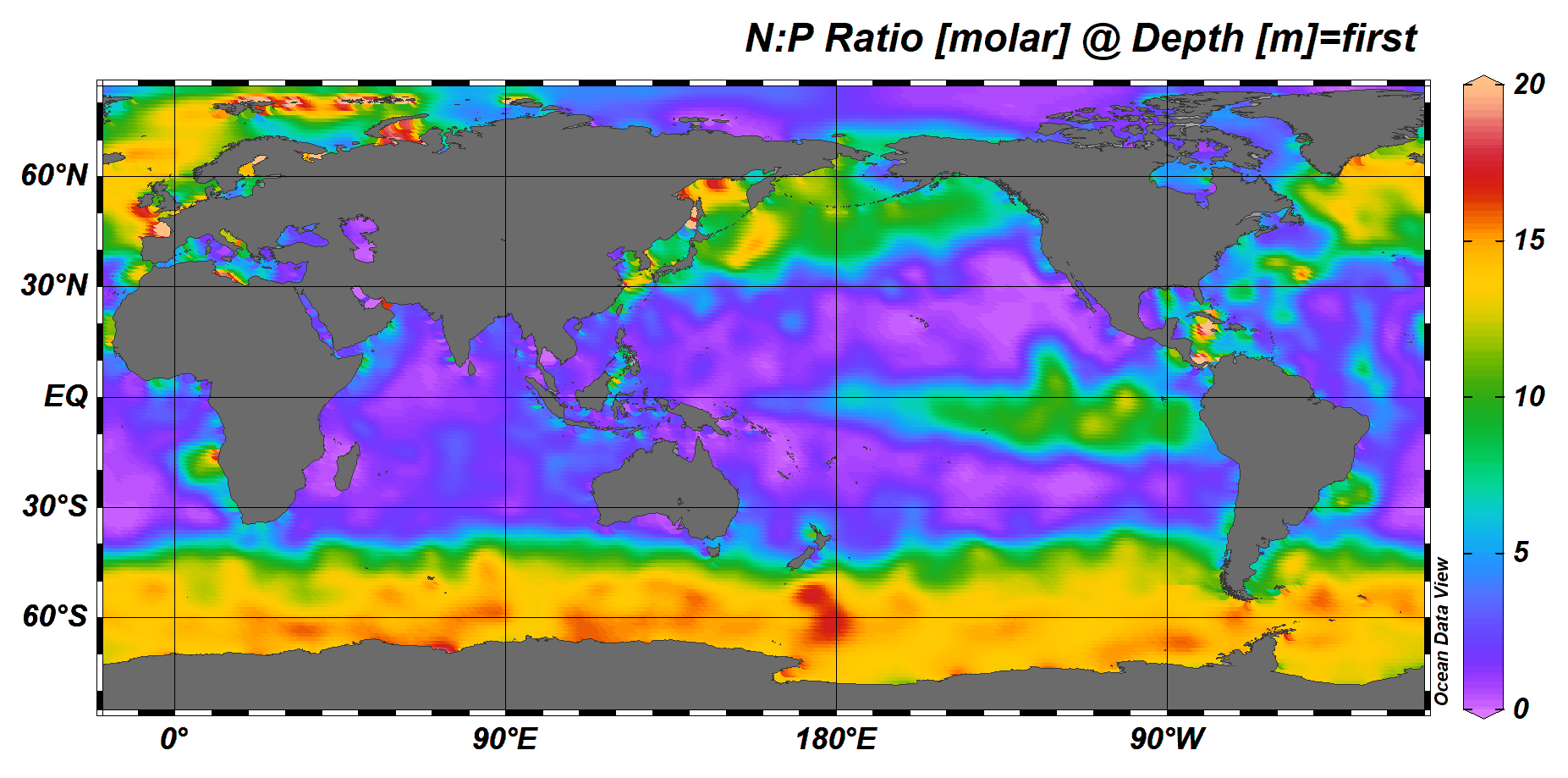
Nitrogen to phosphorus ratio at the ocean surface. Nutrients are available in the three HNLC (high-nutrient, low-chlorophyll) regions in sufficient Redfield ratios for biological activity.

== Marine sulfur cycle ==
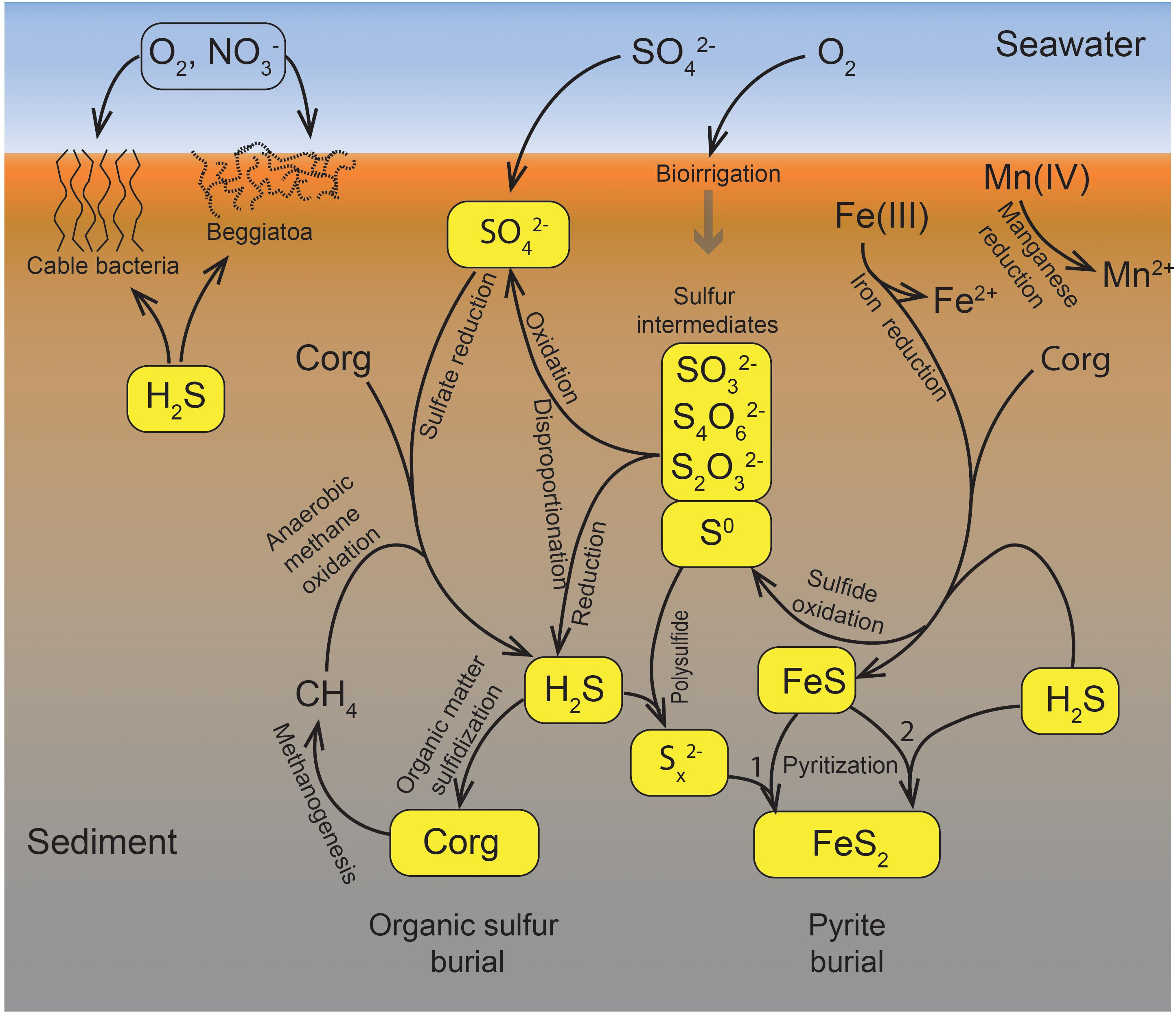
Biogeochemical sulfur cycle of marine sediments Arrows indicate fluxes and pathways of biological or chemical processes. Microbial dissimilatory sulfate reduction to sulfide is a predominant terminal pathway of organic matter mineralization in the anoxic seabed. Chemical or microbial oxidation of the produced sulfide establishes a complex network of pathways in the sulfur cycle, leading to intermediate sulfur species and partly back to sulfate. The intermediates include elemental sulfur, polysulfides, thiosulfate, and sulfite, which are all substrates for further microbial oxidation, reduction or disproportionation. New microbiological discoveries, such as long-distance electron transfer through sulfide oxidizing cable bacteria, add to the complexity. Isotope exchange reactions play an important role for the stable isotope geochemistry and for the experimental study of sulfur transformations using radiotracers. Microbially catalyzed processes are partly reversible whereby the back-reaction affects our interpretation of radiotracer experiments and provides a mechanism for isotope fractionation.

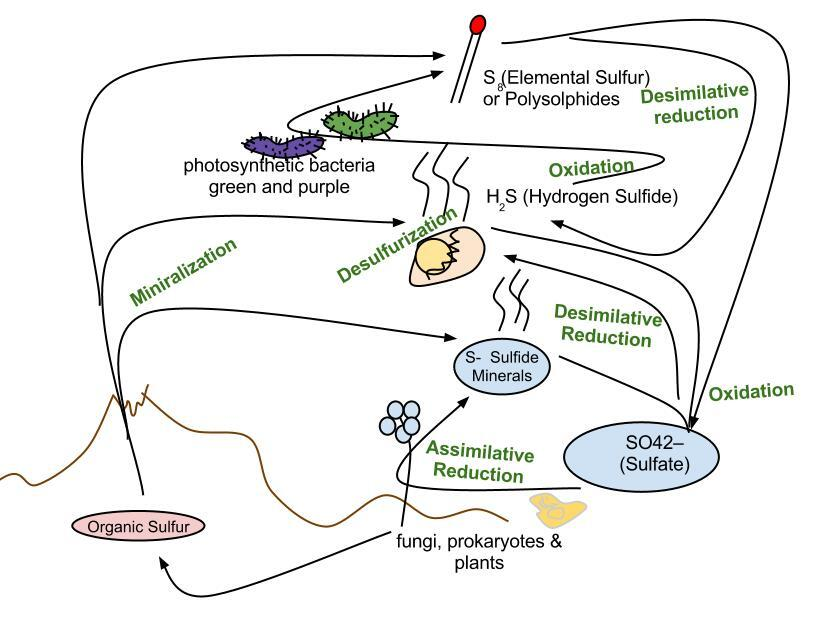
Sulfur cycle

Sulfate reduction in the seabed is strongly focused toward near-surface sediments with high depositional rates along the ocean margins. The benthic marine sulfur cycle is therefore sensitive to anthropogenic influence, such as ocean warming and increased nutrient loading of coastal seas. This stimulates photosynthetic productivity and results in enhanced export of organic matter to the seafloor, often combined with low oxygen concentration in the bottom water (Rabalais et al., 2014; Breitburg et al., 2018). The biogeochemical zonation is thereby compressed toward the sediment surface, and the balance of organic matter mineralization is shifted from oxic and suboxic processes toward sulfate reduction and methanogenesis (Middelburg and Levin, 2009).

- cable bacteria

The sulfur cycle in marine environments has been well-studied via the tool of sulfur isotope systematics expressed as δ^{34}S. The modern global oceans have sulfur storage of 1.3 × 10^{21} g, mainly occurring as sulfate with the δ^{34}S value of +21‰. The overall input flux is 1.0 × 10^{14} g/year with the sulfur isotope composition of ~3‰. Riverine sulfate derived from the terrestrial weathering of sulfide minerals (δ^{34}S = +6‰) is the primary input of sulfur to the oceans. Other sources are metamorphic and volcanic degassing and hydrothermal activity (δ^{34}S = 0‰), which release reduced sulfur species (e.g., H_{2}S and S^{0}). There are two major outputs of sulfur from the oceans. The first sink is the burial of sulfate either as marine evaporites (e.g., gypsum) or carbonate-associated sulfate (CAS), which accounts for 6 × 10^{13} g/year (δ^{34}S = +21‰). The second sulfur sink is pyrite burial in shelf sediments or deep seafloor sediments (4 × 10^{13} g/year; δ^{34}S = -20‰). The total marine sulfur output flux is 1.0 × 10^{14} g/year which matches the input fluxes, implying the modern marine sulfur budget is at steady state. The residence time of sulfur in modern global oceans is 13,000,000 years.

In modern oceans, Hydrogenovibrio crunogenus, Halothiobacillus, and Beggiatoa are primary sulfur oxidizing bacteria, and form chemosynthetic symbioses with animal hosts. The host provides metabolic substrates (e.g., CO_{2}, O_{2}, H_{2}O) to the symbiont while the symbiont generates organic carbon for sustaining the metabolic activities of the host. The produced sulfate usually combines with the leached calcium ions to form gypsum, which can form widespread deposits on near mid-ocean spreading centers.

Hydrothermal vents emit hydrogen sulfide that support the carbon fixation of chemolithotrophic bacteria that oxidize hydrogen sulfide with oxygen to produce elemental sulfur or sulfate.

== Iron cycle and dust ==
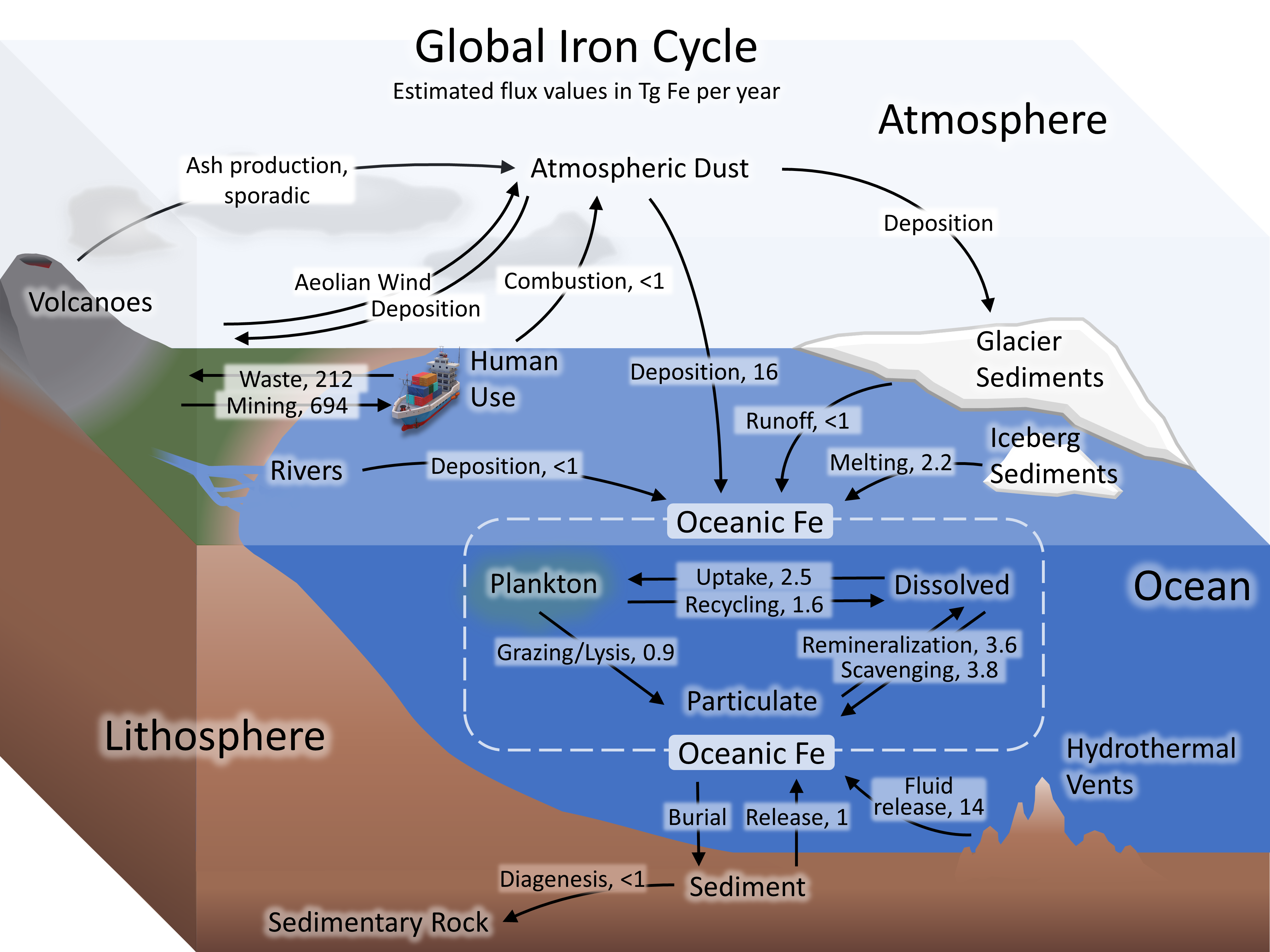
Biogeochemical iron cycle: Iron circulates through the atmosphere, lithosphere, and oceans. Labeled arrows show flux in Tg of iron per year.

The iron cycle (Fe) is the biogeochemical cycle of iron through the atmosphere, hydrosphere, biosphere and lithosphere. While Fe is highly abundant in the Earth's crust, it is less common in oxygenated surface waters. Iron is a key micronutrient in primary productivity, and a limiting nutrient in the Southern ocean, eastern equatorial Pacific, and the subarctic Pacific referred to as High-Nutrient, Low-Chlorophyll (HNLC) regions of the ocean.

Iron in the ocean cycles between plankton, aggregated particulates (non-bioavailable iron), and dissolved (bioavailable iron), and becomes sediments through burial. Hydrothermal vents release ferrous iron to the ocean in addition to oceanic iron inputs from land sources. Iron reaches the atmosphere through volcanism, aeolian wind, and some via combustion by humans. In the Anthropocene, iron is removed from mines in the crust and a portion re-deposited in waste repositories.

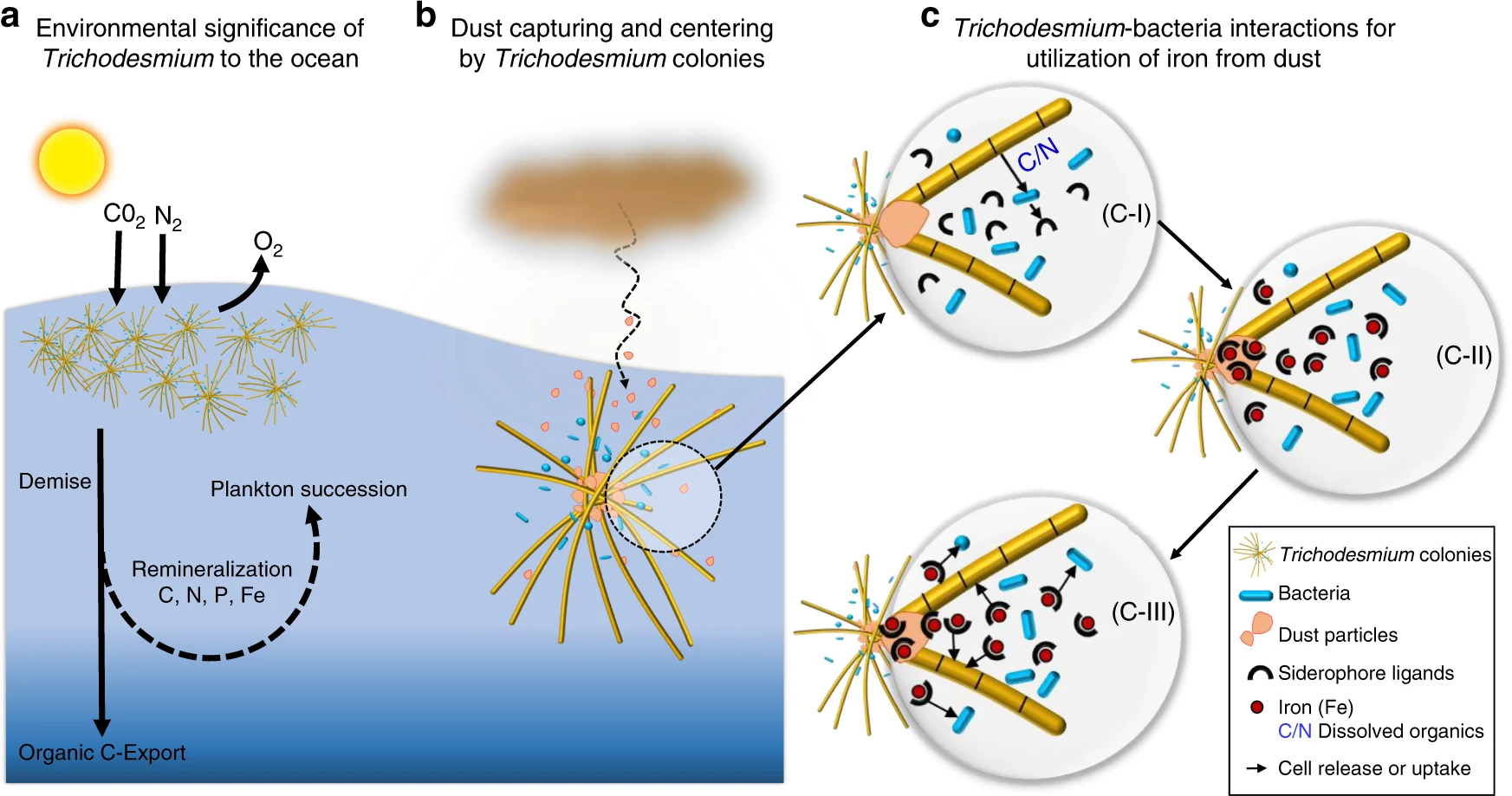
Colonies of marine cyanobacteria Trichodesmium interact with other bacteria to acquire iron from dust a. The N_{2}-fixing Trichodesmium spp., which commonly occurs in tropical and sub-tropical waters, is of large environmental significance in fertilizing the ocean with important nutrients. b. Trichodesmium can establish massive blooms in nutrient poor ocean regions with high dust deposition, partly due to their unique ability to capture dust, center it, and subsequently dissolve it. c. Proposed dust-bound Fe acquisition pathway: Bacteria residing within the colonies produce siderophores (C-I) that react with the dust particles in the colony core and generate dissolved Fe (C-II). This dissolved Fe, complexed by siderophores, is then acquired by both Trichodesmium and its resident bacteria (C-III), resulting in a mutual benefit to both partners of the consortium.

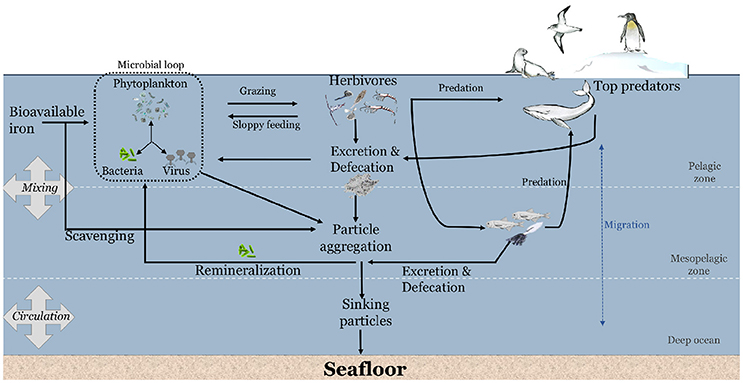
Role of marine animals in the cycling of iron in the Southern Ocean

global dust

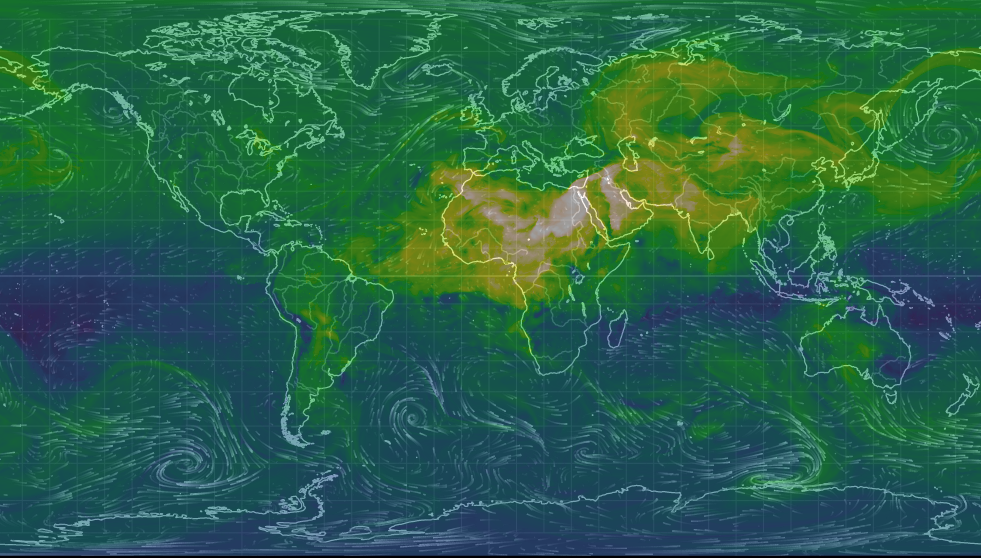
Map of dust in 2017

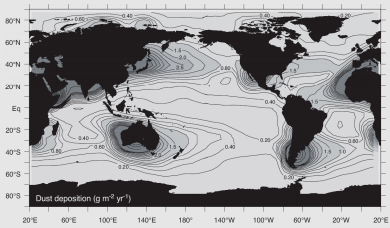
Global oceanic distribution of dust deposition

Iron is an essential micronutrient for almost every life form. It is a key component of hemoglobin, important to nitrogen fixation as part of the Nitrogenase enzyme family, and as part of the iron-sulfur core of ferredoxin it facilitates electron transport in chloroplasts, eukaryotic mitochondria, and bacteria. Due to the high reactivity of Fe^{2+} with oxygen and low solubility of Fe^{3+}, iron is a limiting nutrient in most regions of the world.

== Calcium and silica cycles ==
Carbonate-silicate cycle (carbon cycle focus)

The calcium cycle is a transfer of calcium between dissolved and solid phases. There is a continuous supply of calcium ions into waterways from rocks, organisms, and soils. Calcium ions are consumed and removed from aqueous environments as they react to form insoluble structures such as calcium carbonate and calcium silicate, which can deposit to form sediments or the exoskeletons of organisms. Calcium ions can also be utilized biologically, as calcium is essential to biological functions such as the production of bones and teeth or cellular function. The calcium cycle is a common thread between terrestrial, marine, geological, and biological processes. Calcium moves through these different media as it cycles throughout the Earth. The marine calcium cycle is affected by changing atmospheric carbon dioxide due to ocean acidification.

Biogenic calcium carbonate is formed when marine organisms, such as coccolithophores, corals, pteropods, and other mollusks transform calcium ions and bicarbonate into shells and exoskeletons of calcite or aragonite, both forms of calcium carbonate. This is the dominant sink for dissolved calcium in the ocean. Dead organisms sink to the bottom of the ocean, depositing layers of shell which over time cement to form limestone. This is the origin of both marine and terrestrial limestone.

Calcium precipitates into calcium carbonate according to the following equation:

Ca^{2+} + 2HCO_{3}^{−} → CO_{2}+ H_{2}O + CaCO_{3}

The relationship between dissolved calcium and calcium carbonate is affected greatly by the levels of carbon dioxide (CO_{2}) in the atmosphere.

Increased carbon dioxide leads to more bicarbonate in the ocean according to the following equation:

CO_{2} + CO_{3}^{2−} + H_{2}O → 2HCO_{3}^{−}

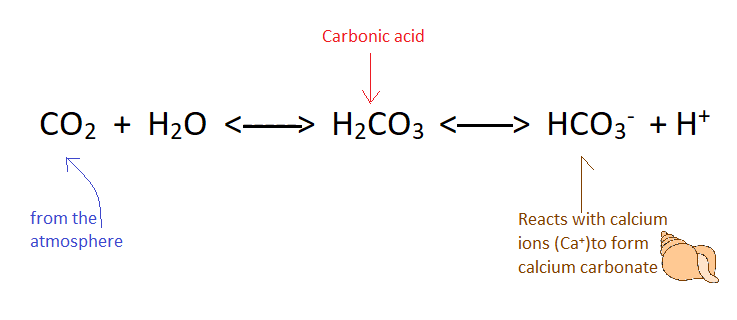
Equilibrium of carbonic acid in the oceans

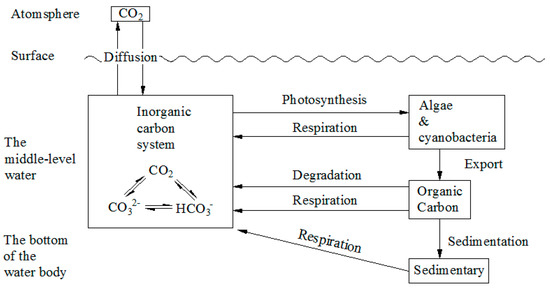
The carbonate cycle in the water environment

With its close relation to the carbon cycle and the effects of greenhouse gasses, both calcium and carbon cycles are predicted to change in the coming years. Tracking calcium isotopes enables the prediction of environmental changes, with many sources suggesting increasing temperatures in both the atmosphere and marine environment. As a result, this will drastically alter the breakdown of rock, the pH of oceans and waterways and thus calcium sedimentation, hosting an array of implications on the calcium cycle.

Due to the complex interactions of calcium with many facets of life, the effects of altered environmental conditions are unlikely to be known until they occur. Predictions can however be tentatively made, based upon evidence-based research. Increasing carbon dioxide levels and decreasing ocean pH will alter calcium solubility, preventing corals and shelled organisms from developing their calcium-based exoskeletons, thus making them vulnerable or unable to survive.

Most biological production of biogenic silica in the ocean is driven by diatoms, with further contributions from radiolarians. These microorganisms extract dissolved silicic acid from surface waters during growth, and return this by recycling throughout the water column after they die. Inputs of silicon to the ocean from above arrive via rivers and aeolian dust, while those from below include seafloor sediment recycling, weathering, and hydrothermal activity.

Modern oceanic silicon cycle showing major flows and magnitudes Fluxes in T mol Si y^{−1} = 28 million tonnes of silicon per year

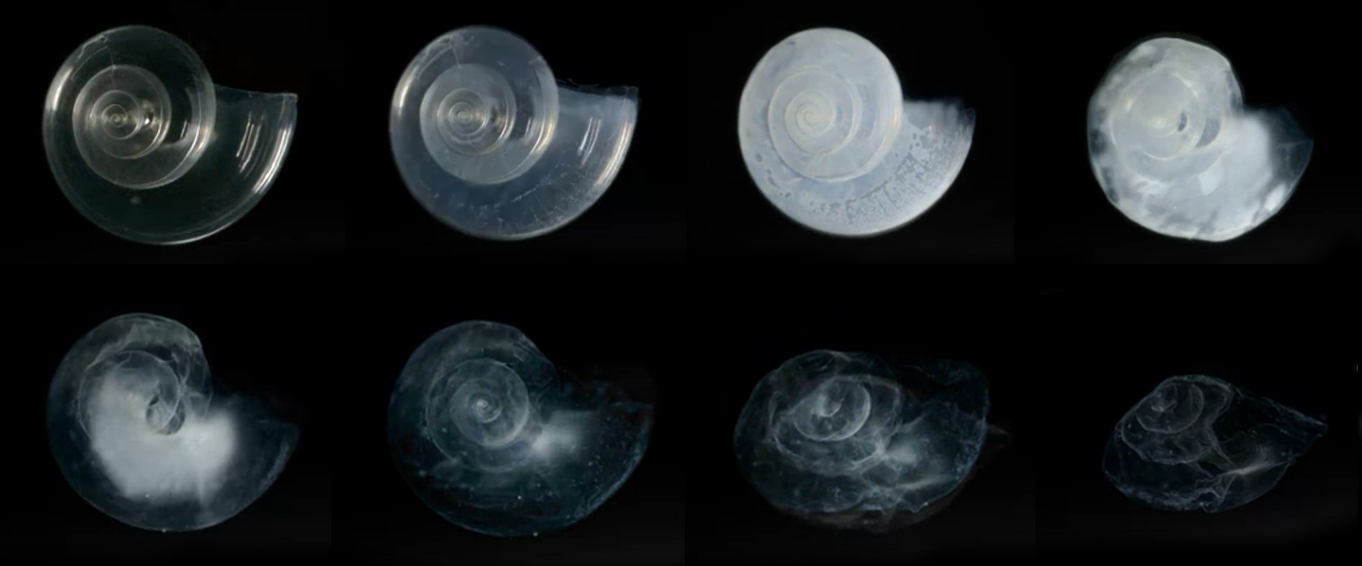
Effects of an acidic ocean (with pH projected for the year 2100) on a pteropod shell made of calcite - the shell progressively dissolves in the lower pH as calcium is drawn out of the shell

=== Biomineralization ===
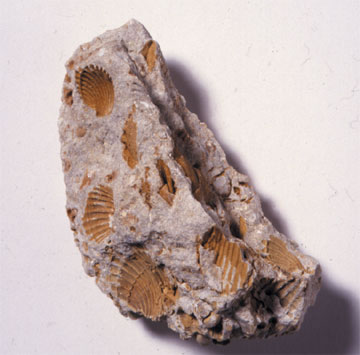
Deposition of calcifying organisms/shells on the ocean floor

"Biological activity is a dominant force shaping the chemical structure and evolution of the earth surface environment. The presence of an oxygenated atmosphere-hydrosphere surrounding an otherwise highly reducing solid earth is the most striking consequence of the rise of life on earth. Biological evolution and the functioning of ecosystems, in turn, are to a large degree conditioned by geophysical and geological processes. Understanding the interactions between organisms and their abiotic environment, and the resulting coupled evolution of the biosphere and geosphere is a central theme of research in biogeology. Biogeochemists contribute to this understanding by studying the transformations and transport of chemical substrates and products of biological activity in the environment."

"Since the Cambrian explosion, mineralized body parts have been secreted in large quantities by biota. Because calcium carbonate, silica and calcium phosphate are the main mineral phases constituting these hard parts, biomineralization plays an important role in the global biogeochemical cycles of carbon, calcium, silicon and phosphorus"

== Deep cycling ==
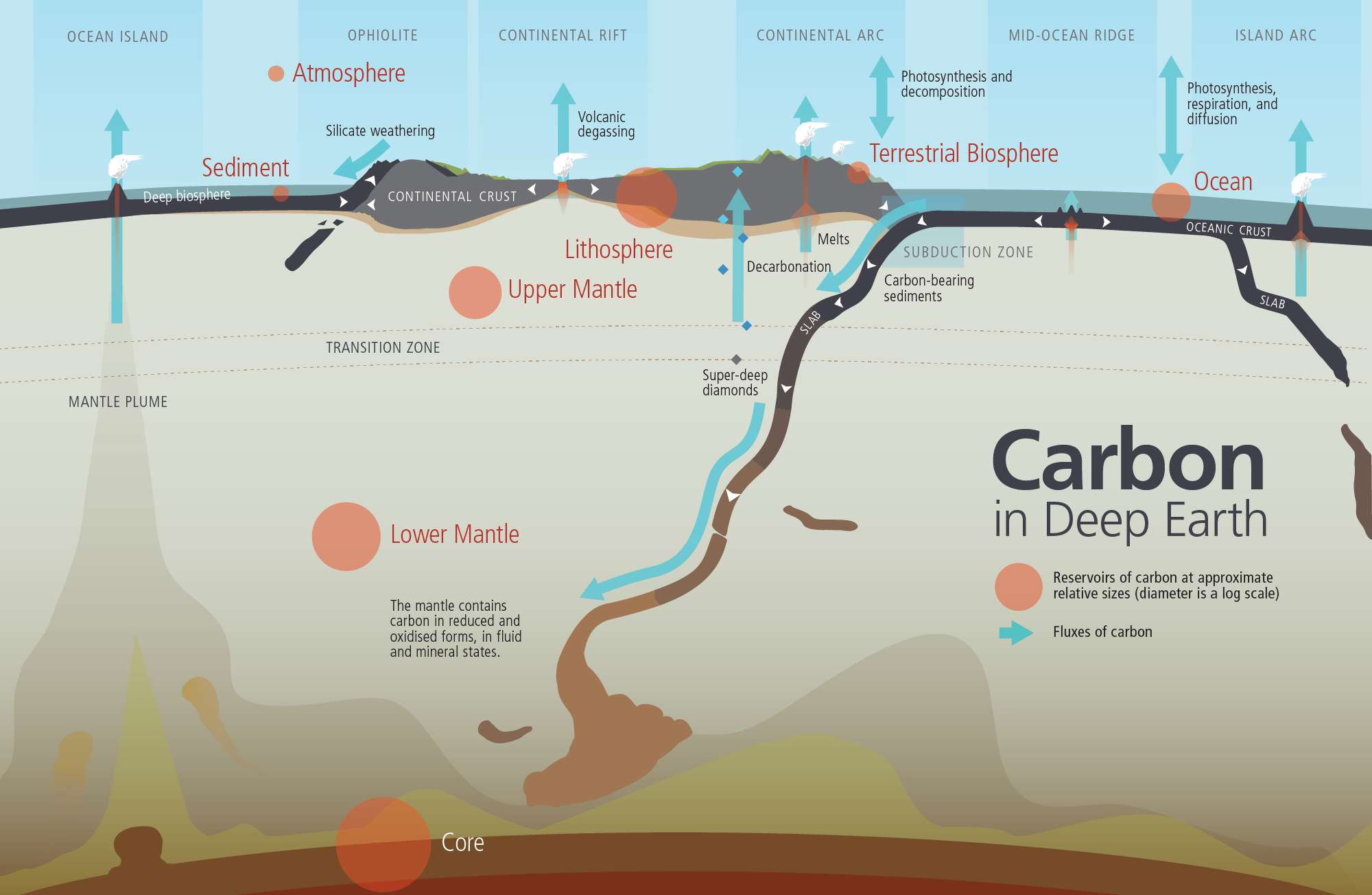
Deep earth carbon

Deep cycling involves the exchange of materials with the mantle. The deep water cycle involves exchange of water with the mantle, with water carried down by subducting oceanic plates and returning through volcanic activity, distinct from the water cycle process that occurs above and on the surface of Earth. Some of the water makes it all the way to the lower mantle and may even reach the outer core.

In the conventional view of the water cycle (also known as the hydrologic cycle), water moves between reservoirs in the atmosphere and Earth's surface or near-surface (including the ocean, rivers and lakes, glaciers and polar ice caps, the biosphere and groundwater). However, in addition to the surface cycle, water also plays an important role in geological processes reaching down into the crust and mantle. Water content in magma determines how explosive a volcanic eruption is; hot water is the main conduit for economically important minerals to concentrate in hydrothermal mineral deposits; and water plays an important role in the formation and migration of petroleum. Petroleum is a fossil fuel derived from ancient fossilized organic materials, such as zooplankton and algae.

Water is not just present as a separate phase in the ground. Seawater percolates into oceanic crust and hydrates igneous rocks such as olivine and pyroxene, transforming them into hydrous minerals such as serpentines, talc and brucite. In this form, water is carried down into the mantle. In the upper mantle, heat and pressure dehydrates these minerals, releasing much of it to the overlying mantle wedge, triggering the melting of rock that rises to form volcanic arcs. However, some of the "nominally anhydrous minerals" that are stable deeper in the mantle can store small concentrations of water in the form of hydroxyl (OH^{−}), and because they occupy large volumes of the Earth, they are capable of storing at least as much as the world's oceans.

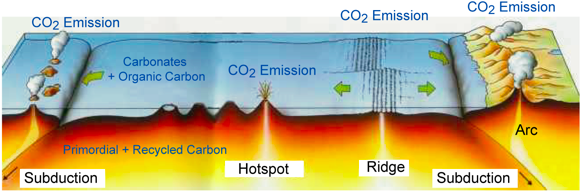
Carbon outgassing processes

The conventional view of the ocean's origin is that it was filled by outgassing from the mantle in the early Archean and the mantle has remained dehydrated ever since. However, subduction carries water down at a rate that would empty the ocean in 1–2 billion years. Despite this, changes in the global sea level over the past 3–4 billion years have only been a few hundred metres, much smaller than the average ocean depth of 4 kilometres. Thus, the fluxes of water into and out of the mantle are expected to be roughly balanced, and the water content of the mantle steady. Water carried into the mantle eventually returns to the surface in eruptions at mid-ocean ridges and hotspots. Estimates of the amount of water in the mantle range from 1/4 to 4 times the water in the ocean.

The deep carbon cycle is the movement of carbon through the Earth's mantle and core. It forms part of the carbon cycle and is intimately connected to the movement of carbon in the Earth's surface and atmosphere. By returning carbon to the deep Earth, it plays a critical role in maintaining the terrestrial conditions necessary for life to exist. Without it, carbon would accumulate in the atmosphere, reaching extremely high concentrations over long periods of time.

== Rock cycle ==
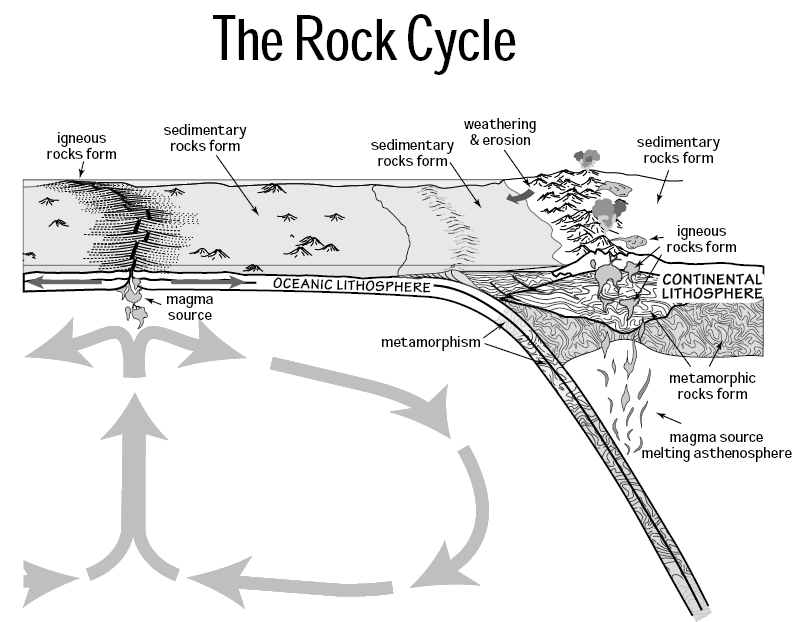
The rock cycle and plate tectonics

== Fossil fuels ==
Aquatic phytoplankton and zooplankton that died and sedimented in large quantities under anoxic conditions millions of years ago began forming petroleum and natural gas as a result of anaerobic decomposition (by contrast, terrestrial plants tended to form coal and methane). Over geological time this organic matter, mixed with mud, became buried under further heavy layers of inorganic sediment. The resulting high temperature and pressure caused the organic matter to chemically alter, first into a waxy material known as kerogen, which is found in oil shales, and then with more heat into liquid and gaseous hydrocarbons in a process known as catagenesis. Such organisms and their resulting fossil fuels typically have an age of millions of years, and sometimes more than 650 million years, the energy released in combustion is still photosynthetic in origin.

== Other cycles ==
Such as trace minerals, micronutrients, human-induced cycles for synthetic compounds such as polychlorinated biphenyl (PCB).

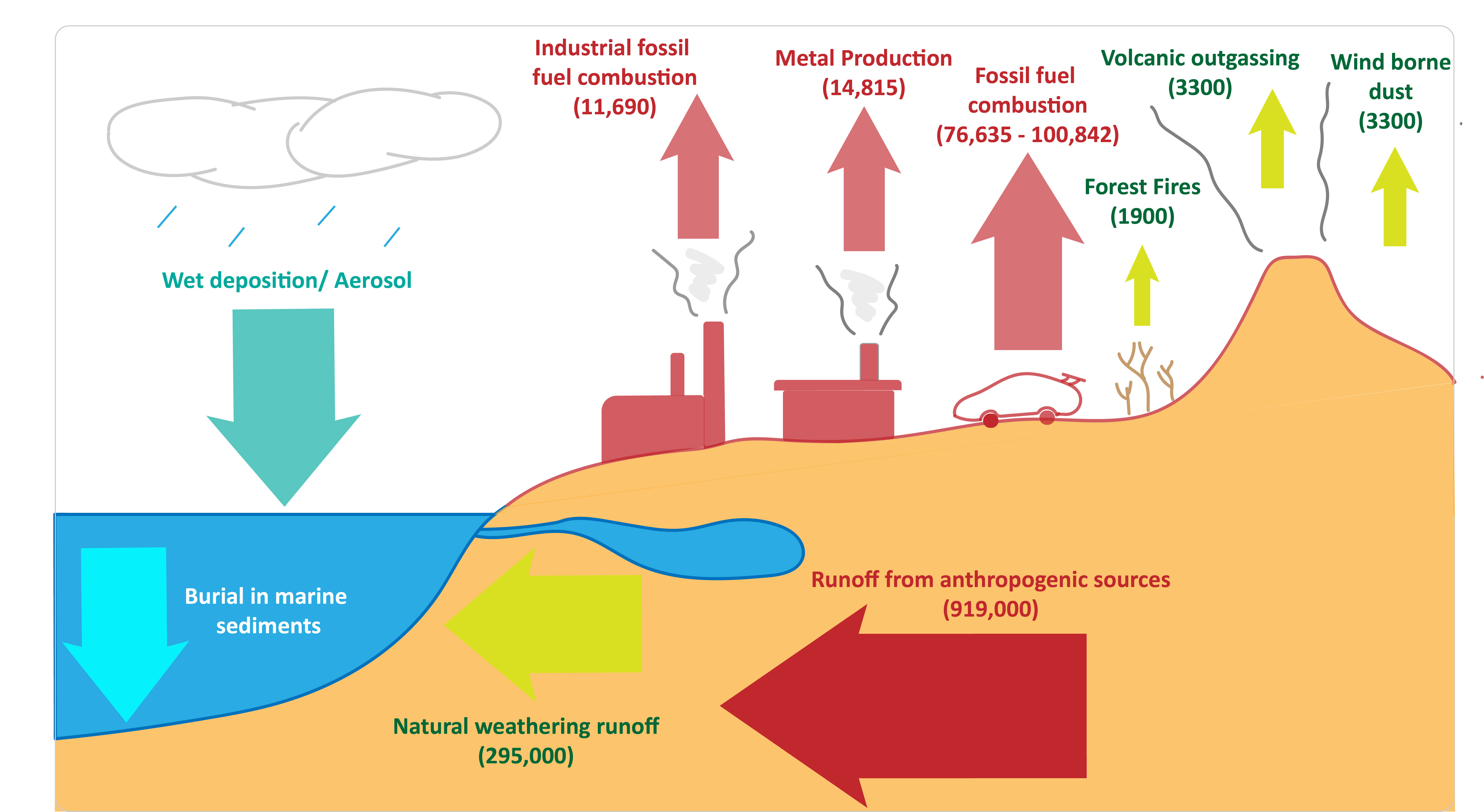
Lead cycle

Mercury cycle

== Sources ==
- Nordin, B. E. C., ed. (1988). Calcium in Human Biology. ILSI Human Nutrition Reviews. doi:10.1007/978-1-4471-1437-6. ISBN 978-1-4471-1439-0.
- Schlesinger, William H.; Bernhardt, Emily S. (2020). Biogeochemistry: An Analysis of Global Change. doi:10.1016/C2017-0-00311-7. ISBN 978-0-12-814608-8.

== Further references ==
- James, Rachael (2005). Marine Biogeochemical Cycles. Butterworth-Heinemann. ISBN 978-0-7506-6793-7.
