= Dark oxygen =

Deep sea oxygen created by electrolysis

Dark oxygen production refers to the generation of molecular oxygen (O_{2}) through processes that do not involve light-dependent oxygenic photosynthesis. While the majority of Earth's oxygen is produced via photosynthesis, dark oxygen production occurs via a variety of abiotic and biotic processes and may support aerobic metabolism in dark, anoxic environments.

One recent theory for dark oxygen production, via electrolysis mediated by manganese nodules on the abyssal seafloor is controversial.

== Abiotic production ==
Abiotic production of dark oxygen can occur through mechanisms including:

- Water radiolysis: This process typically takes place in dark geological ecosystems, such as aquifers, where the decay of radioactive elements in surrounding rock leads to the breakdown of water molecules, producing O_{2.}
- Oxidation of surface-bound radicals: On silicon-bearing minerals like quartz, surface-bound radicals can undergo oxidation, contributing to O_{2} production.

In addition to direct O_{2} formation, these processes often produce reactive oxygen species (ROS), such as hydroxyl radicals (OH^{•}), superoxide (O_{2}^{•-}), and hydrogen peroxide (H_{2}O_{2}). These ROS can be converted into O_{2} and water either biotically, through enzymes including superoxide dismutase and catalase, or abiotically, via reactions with ferrous iron and other reduced metals.

== Biotic production ==
Biotic production of dark oxygen is performed by microorganisms through distinct microbial processes, including:

- Chlorite dismutation: the dismutation of chlorite (ClO_{2}^{−}) into O_{2} and chloride ions.
- Nitric oxide dismutation: the dismutation of nitric oxide (NO) into O_{2} and dinitrogen gas (N_{2}) or nitrous oxide (N_{2}O).
- Water lysis via methanobactins: Methanobactins can lyse water molecules to produce O_{2.}

These processes enable microbial communities to sustain aerobic metabolism in environments that lack oxygen.

== Experimental evidence ==
- Groundwater ecosystems: Dissolved oxygen concentrations have been measured in old groundwaters previously assumed to be anoxic. The presence of O_{2} is attributed to microbial communities producing dark oxygen, and to water radiolysis. Metagenomic analyses and oxygen isotope studies further support local oxygen generation rather than atmospheric mixing.
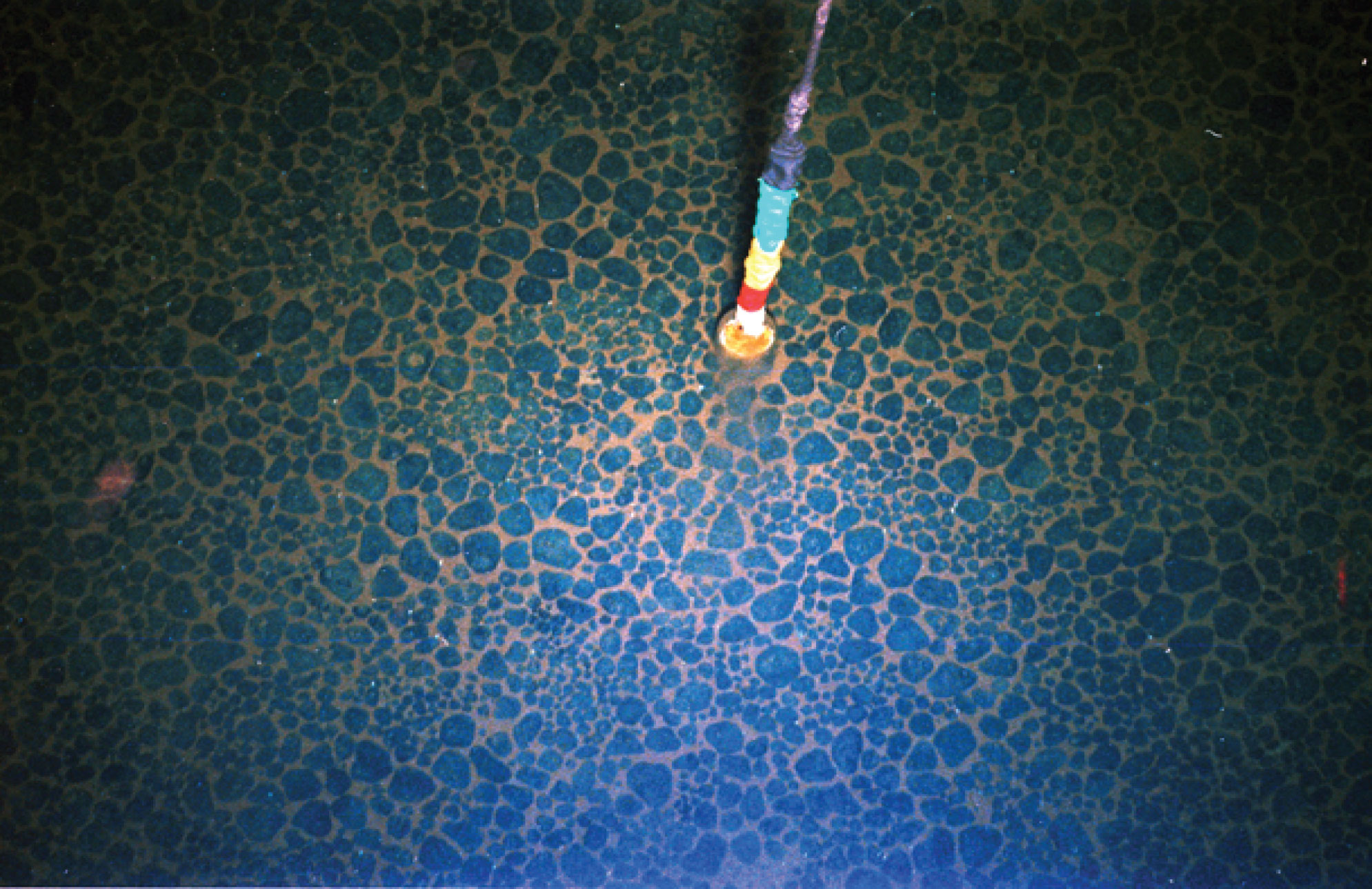
  A bed of manganese nodules offshore of the Cook Islands
- Seafloor environments: A study on manganese nodules on the abyssal seafloor has suggested abiotic dark oxygen production. The proposed mechanism is electrolysis, because of voltages recorded on the surface of the nodules. However, no voltage great enough to split water was measured, the energy source for electrolysis is unknown, and previous experiments from the same region have not found any evidence of oxygen production. It has since emerged that manganese nodules were not present in some of the experiments that recorded rising oxygen, and that the result is likely experimental artefact. The authors have since backed away from the two key claims made in the original article - that the rising oxygen levels can be attributed to manganese nodules, and that this is due to the nodules acting like batteries.

== Implications ==
Despite its diverse pathways, dark oxygen production has traditionally been considered negligible in Earth's systems. Recent evidence suggests that O_{2} is produced and consumed in dark, apparently anoxic environments on a much larger scale than previously thought, with implications for global biogeochemical cycles.
