= Carbon cycle (disambiguation) =

Carbon cycle are the natural processes of carbon exchange.

It may also refer to:

- Carbon–nitrogen–oxygen cycle, the thermonuclear reaction involving carbon that powers some stars
- Carbonate–silicate cycle, a geochemical cycle
- Cyclic compound, organic chemical ring-shaped structures
- Deep carbon cycle carbon in Earth's mantle and core
