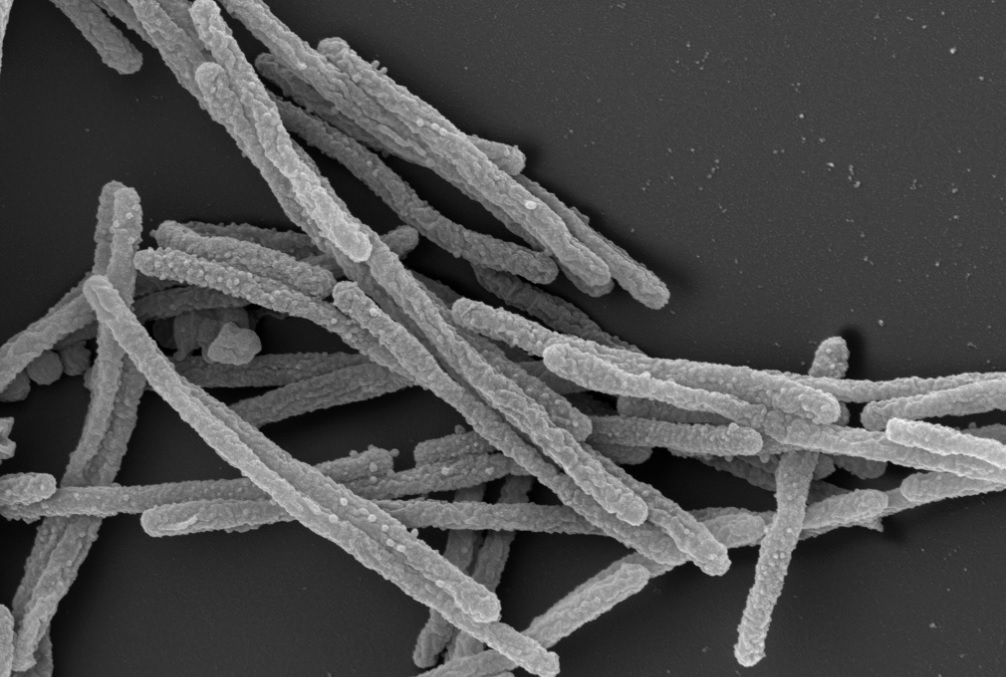

Scientific classification
- Domain: Bacteria
- Kingdom: Pseudomonadati
- Phylum: Acidobacteriota
- Class: Holophagae
- Order: Holophagales
- Family: Holophagaceae
- Genus: Geothrix; Coates et al. 1999
- Species: G. fermentans

Binomial name
- Geothrix fermentans Coates et al. 1999

= Geothrix fermentans =

Species of bacterium

Geothrix fermentans is a rod-shaped, anaerobic bacterium. It is about 0.1 μm in diameter and ranges from 2-3 μm in length. Cell arrangement occurs singly and in chains. Geothrix fermentans can normally be found in aquatic sediments such as in aquifers. As an anaerobic chemoorganotroph, this organism is best known for its ability to use electron acceptors Fe(III), as well as other high potential metals. It also uses a wide range of substrates as electron donors. Research on metal reduction by G. fermentans has contributed to understanding more about the geochemical cycling of metals in the environment.

== Taxonomy history ==
Geothrix fermentans was isolated from metal-contaminated waters of an aquifer in 1999 by John D. Coates from Southern Illinois University and by others from the University of Massachusetts. The novel strain was originally named "Strain H-5^{T} ". After classifying metabolism and confirming the presence and number of c-type cytochromes, Coates et al. proposed that the novel organism belongs to the newly recognized (1991) Halophoga-Acidobacterium phylum. Coates et al. also proposed a new name for the organism: "Geothrix"- Greek for hair-like cell that comes from the Earth and "fermentans"- Latin for "fermenting."

=== Phylogeny ===
Approaches based on 16S rRNA gene sequence comparison have allowed for detailed analyses of the affiliations of many bacterial groups. The phylogenetic affiliation of Geothrix fermentans as well as other soil bacteria such as Acidobacterium capsulatum and Holophoga foetida had not been established at the time of their initial isolation. More recent analysis 16S rRNA sequence data showed moderate similarity between these three genera supporting the likelihood that they may have differentiated from a common ancestor.

- - - Geothrix fermentans
    - Holophaga foetida
  - Acidobacteriaceae

== Biology ==
Geothrix fermentans is a rod-shaped strict anaerobe that can be found in aquatic soils in the Fe(III) reduction zone. As a strict anaerobe G. fermentans cannot grow in the presence of atmospheric oxygen that may be present in the ecological niche from which it was isolated. Geothrix fermentans does not form spores and is non-motile. This organism is one of the few freshwater, cultivable bacteria that exhibit metal respiration using Fe(III) oxide. Optimum temperature for growth is 35 °C with a range from 25 °C to 40 °C. This bacterium preferentially uses the organic acid acetate as an electron donor, but it can utilize several other organic acids for growth such as propionate and lactate. In addition to organic acids, G. fermentans can use fatty acids such as palmitate using Fe(III) as the sole electron acceptor. G. fermentans can also grow using other forms of iron and metals such as manganese, but it shows preference for iron or iron derivatives. Utilization of alternate electron acceptors by this organism depends on the electron donor present. For instance, it will utilize nitrate (NO_{3}) and Mn(IV) as alternative electron acceptors when lactate is being used as the electron donor.

G. fermentans, though it shares similar reduction processes as the other DIRB, displays metabolic characteristics that set it apart from other iron reducers. In the process of respiration, this organism is capable of complete oxidation of the before-mentioned organic acids to CO_{2} using Fe(III), whereas other iron-reducing species of the families Shewanella or Ferrimonas, for example, oxidize the same organic acids incompletely to acetate. Also in contrast to most other DIRB, G. fermentans cannot utilize elemental sulfur as an electron acceptor, a characteristic it shares with DIRB of the genera Geobacter.

Geothrix fermentans can also employ fermentation, as its name implies, to oxidize substrates for energy production. This organism exhibited an ability to grow fermentatively on organic acids such as fumarate and citrate yielding acetate and succinate as fermentation products.

== Metal respiration ==
Metal respiration is a general term in microbiology that describes the ability of certain bacteria to utilize molecules containing metals such as iron, manganese, or others as electron acceptors in the electron transport chain to produce adenosine triphosphate (ATP). The bacterium G. fermentans performs a certain type of metal respiration called dissimilatory Fe(III) oxide (iron oxide) reduction. This organism as well as species from the families Shewanella and Geobacteraceae, which includes genera such as Geovibrio and Desulfuromonas are commonly referred to in microbiology as "Dissimilatory Iron Reducing Bacteria" or "DIRB." Though these families and G. fermentans are phylogenetically separate and distinct, they may often be grouped together based on this shared mechanism of Fe(III) reduction.

In order to integrate Fe(III) into their respiration, certain DIRB must be able to solubilize Fe(III) oxide, a molecule which is largely insoluble in anything other than mineral acids. There are two proposed mechanisms through which this may be accomplished by the bacteria that need insoluble Fe(III) oxide. The first mechanism is dissolution by direct contact with the bacterial cell which is employed in most forms of bacterial metabolism. The second mechanism involves the use of compounds (electron-shuttling compounds) excreted from the bacterial cell that in turn carry electrons from the cell to the Fe(III) oxide molecule causing it to dissolve. Using electron-shuttling compounds is not unusual in the microbial world, but G. fermentans is the first DIRB in which the compounds that solubilize Fe(III) oxide were endogenous and not derived from the environment. Though this organism is the first example of such non-contact metabolism of Fe(III) oxide by iron-reducing bacteria, it is unlikely, pending further research, that it is the only example when taking the vast numbers of unknown bacteria still to be discovered.

== Electricity production ==
Small amounts of electricity are produced by G. fermentans during respiration via the flow of electrons facilitated by endogenous electron-shuttling compounds. Electricity can be generated in "microbial fuel cells" which harness this flow of electrons from the bacterial cell to an anode. The advantage G. fermentans has by being able to reduce Fe(III) from a distance in a natural setting does not translate into an advantage in microbial fuel cells. Once the electrons have been transferred from the shuttling compound to the anode, the compound is free to diffuse back to the cell, but great distances may cause the compound to be lost to the environment. The possibility of compound loss coupled with the great amount of energy needed to produce these compounds does not add up to efficient electricity yield when compared to those DIRB that require direct contact with the electron acceptor. The bacteria such as Geobacter sulfurreducens that are in direct contact with electrodes showed higher total power outputs in several studies, but G. fermentans has a mechanism that has the potential to cover lost ground. By secreting amounts of the unidentified electron shuttle around the cell, accumulation of the compound over time in the environment enhances electron transfer and helps to prevent compound and electron loss.
