= Acanthopleuribacter pedis =

Scientific classification
- Domain: Bacteria
- Kingdom: Pseudomonadati
- Phylum: Acidobacteriota
- Class: Holophagae
- Order: Acanthopleuribacterales
- Family: Acanthopleuribacteraceae
- Genus: Acanthopleuribacter; Fukunaga et al. 2008
- Species: A. pedis

Binomial name
- Acanthopleuribacter pedis Fukunaga et al. 2008

Type strain
- DSM 28897; KCTC 12899; NBRC 101209

Species of bacterium

Acanthopleuribacter pedis is a Gram-negative, rod-shaped bacterium found in marine environments.

Acanthopleuribacter pedis is one of only two species of acidobacteria to have been isolated from animals.

Colonies on marine agar are circular, smooth and yellow in color. Acanthopleuribacter pedis are found on marine agar at a temperature of 15–30 °C (optimally at 30 °C), and grows at a pH of 5–9 (optimally at pH 7–8).

== Etymology ==
The etymology of the genus is: N.L. n. Acanthopleura, a genus of shellfish; N.L. masc. n. bacter, a rod; N.L. masc. n. Acanthopleuribacter, a rod from Acanthopleura, referring to the isolation of the first strain from the chiton Acanthopleura japonica. The genus contains a single species namely A. pedis ( Fukunaga et al. 2008, sp. nov. (Type species of the genus).; L. gen. n. pedis, of the foot, referring to the isolation of the type strain from the foot of a chiton.)

Members of the phylum Acidobacteria are ubiquitous in various environments. Soil acidobacteria have been reported to present a variety of strategies for their success in terrestrial environments
