= Thermotomaculum hydrothermale =

Scientific classification
- Domain: Bacteria
- Kingdom: Pseudomonadati
- Phylum: Acidobacteriota
- Class: Holophagae
- Order: Thermotomaculales; Dedysh and Yilmaz 2018
- Family: Thermotomaculaceae; Dedysh and Yilmaz 2018
- Genus: Thermotomaculum; Izumi et al. 2017
- Species: T. hydrothermale

Binomial name
- Thermotomaculum hydrothermale Izumi et al. 2017

Type strain
- AC55; DSM 24660; JCM 17643; NBRC 107904

Species of bacteria

Thermotomaculum hydrothermale is a species of Acidobacteriota.
