= Deep carbon cycle =

Movement of carbon through Earth's mantle and core

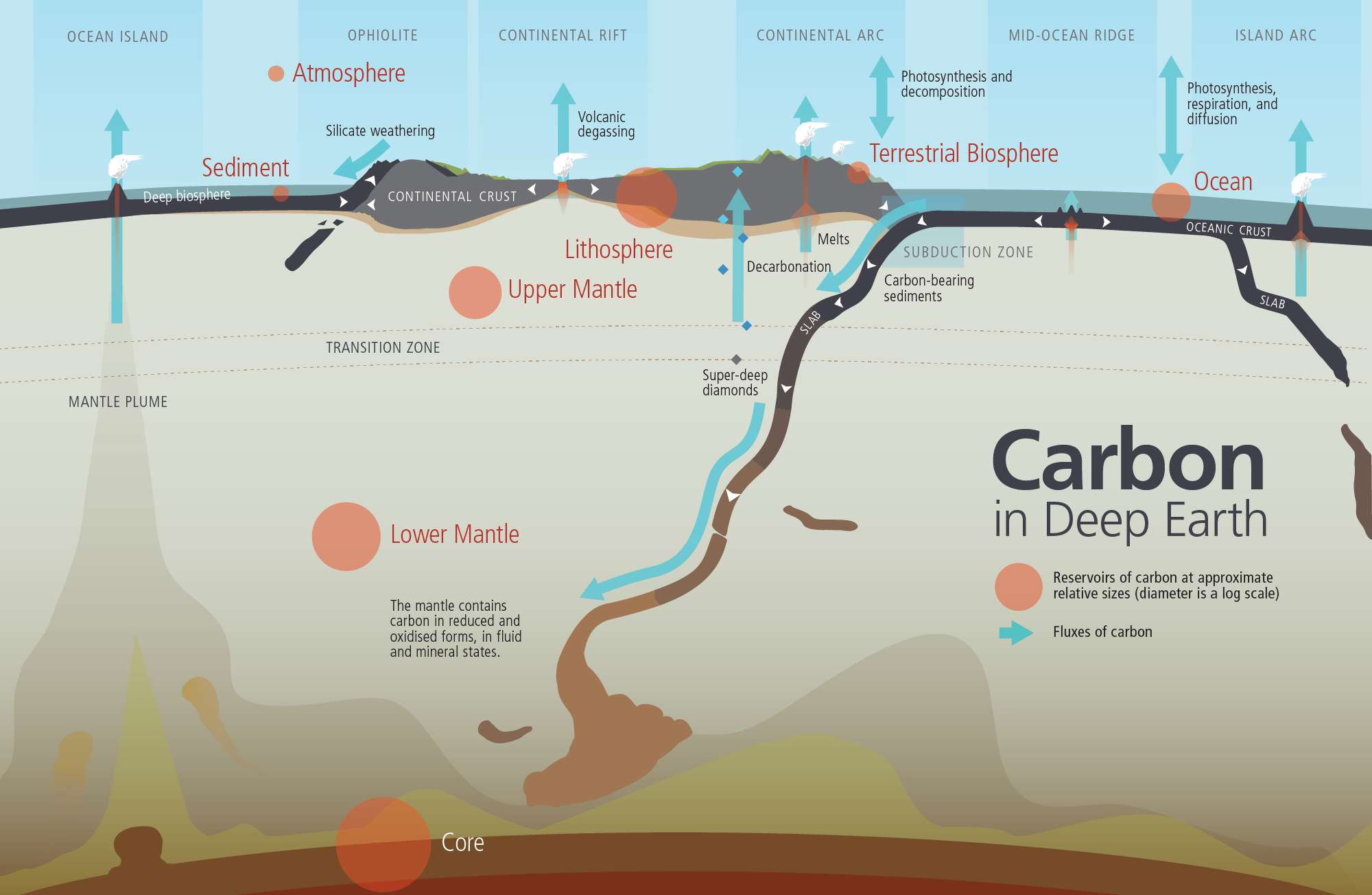
Deep earth carbon

The deep carbon cycle (or slow carbon cycle) is geochemical cycle (movement) of carbon through the Earth's mantle and core. It forms part of the carbon cycle and is intimately connected to the movement of carbon in the Earth's surface and atmosphere. By returning carbon to the deep Earth, it plays a critical role in maintaining the terrestrial conditions necessary for life to exist. Without it, carbon would accumulate in the atmosphere, reaching extremely high concentrations over long periods of time.

Because the deep Earth is inaccessible to drilling, not much is conclusively known about the role of carbon in it. Nonetheless, several pieces of evidence—many of which come from laboratory simulations of deep Earth conditions—have indicated mechanisms for the element's movement down into the lower mantle, as well as the forms that carbon takes at the extreme temperatures and pressures of this layer. Furthermore, techniques like seismology have led to greater understanding of the potential presence of carbon in the Earth's core. Studies of the composition of basaltic magma and the flux of carbon dioxide out of volcanoes reveal that the amount of carbon in the mantle is greater than that on the Earth's surface by a factor of one thousand.

== Quantity of carbon ==
There are about 44,000 gigatonnes of carbon in the atmosphere and oceans. A gigatonne is one billion metric tonnes, equivalent to the mass of water in over 400,000 Olympic-size swimming pools. Large as this quantity is, it only amounts to a small fraction of one percent of Earth's carbon. Over 90% may reside in the core, most of the rest being in the crust and mantle.

In the photosphere of the Sun, carbon is the fourth most abundant element. The Earth likely started with a similar ratio but lost a lot of it to evaporation as it accreted. Even accounting for evaporation, however, the silicates making up the crust and mantle of the Earth have a carbon concentration that is five to ten times less than in CI chondrites, a form of meteor that is believed to represent the composition of the solar nebula before the planets formed. Some of this carbon may have ended up in the core. Depending on the model, carbon is predicted to contribute between 0.2 and 1 percent by weight in the core. Even at the lower concentration, this would account for half Earth's carbon.

Estimates of the carbon content in the upper mantle come from measurements of the chemistry of mid-ocean ridge basalts (MORBs). These must be corrected for degassing of carbon and other elements. Since the Earth formed, the upper mantle has lost 40–90% of its carbon by evaporation and transport to the core in iron compounds. The most rigorous estimate gives a carbon content of 30 parts per million (ppm). The lower mantle is expected to be much less depleted – about 350 ppm.

== Lower mantle ==
Carbon principally enters the mantle in the form of carbonate-rich sediments on tectonic plates of ocean crust, which pull the carbon into the mantle upon undergoing subduction. Not much is known about carbon circulation in the mantle, especially in the deep Earth, but many studies have attempted to augment our understanding of the element's movement and forms within said region. For instance, a 2011 study demonstrated that carbon cycling extends all the way to the lower mantle. The study analysed rare, super-deep diamonds at a site in Juina, Brazil, determining that the bulk composition of some of the diamonds' inclusions matched the expected result of basalt melting and crystallisation under lower mantle temperatures and pressures. Thus, the investigation's findings indicate that pieces of basaltic oceanic lithosphere act as the principal transport mechanism for carbon to Earth's deep interior. These subducted carbonates can interact with lower mantle silicates and metals, eventually forming super-deep diamonds like the one found.

Carbon reservoirs in the mantle, crust and surface.
Reservoir	gigatonne C
Above surface	$(43-45) \times 10^3$
Continental crust and lithosphere	$(0.9-3.1) \times 10^8$
Oceanic crust and lithosphere	$1.4 \times 10^8$
Upper mantle	$<3.2 \times 10^7$
Lower mantle	$<1.0 \times 10^9$

Carbonates descending to the lower mantle form other compounds besides diamonds. In 2011, carbonates were subjected to an environment similar to that of 1800 km deep into the Earth, well within the lower mantle. Doing so resulted in the formations of magnesite, siderite, and numerous varieties of graphite. Other experiments—as well as petrologic observations—support this claim, finding that magnesite is actually the most stable carbonate phase in the majority of the mantle. This is largely a result of its higher melting temperature. Consequently, scientists have concluded that carbonates undergo reduction as they descend into the mantle before being stabilised at depth by low oxygen fugacity environments. Magnesium, iron, and other metallic compounds act as buffers throughout the process. The presence of reduced, elemental forms of carbon like graphite would indicate that carbon compounds are reduced as they descend into the mantle.

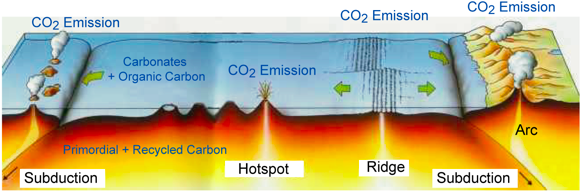
Carbon outgassing processes

Nonetheless, polymorphism alters carbonate compounds' stability at different depths within the Earth. To illustrate, laboratory simulations and density functional theory calculations suggest that tetrahedrally-coordinated carbonates are most stable at depths approaching the core–mantle boundary. A 2015 study indicates that the lower mantle's high pressures cause carbon bonds to transition from sp_{2} to sp_{3} hybridised orbitals, resulting in carbon tetrahedrally bonding to oxygen. CO_{3} trigonal groups cannot form polymerisable networks, while tetrahedral CO_{4} can, signifying an increase in carbon's coordination number, and therefore drastic changes in carbonate compounds' properties in the lower mantle. As an example, preliminary theoretical studies suggest that high pressures cause carbonate melt viscosity to increase; the melts' lower mobility as a result of the property changes described is evidence for large deposits of carbon deep into the mantle.

Accordingly, carbon can remain in the lower mantle for long periods of time, but large concentrations of carbon frequently find their way back to the lithosphere. This process, called carbon outgassing, is the result of carbonated mantle undergoing decompression melting, as well as mantle plumes carrying carbon compounds up towards the crust. Carbon is oxidised upon its ascent towards volcanic hotspots, where it is then released as CO_{2}. This occurs so that the carbon atom matches the oxidation state of the basalts erupting in such areas.

== Core ==
Although the presence of carbon in the Earth's core is well-constrained, recent studies suggest large inventories of carbon could be stored in this region. Shear (S) waves moving through the inner core travel at about fifty percent of the velocity expected for most iron-rich alloys. Considering the core's composition is widely believed to be an alloy of crystalline iron with a small amount of nickel, this seismographic anomaly points to another substance's existence within the region. One theory postulates that such a phenomenon is the result of various light elements, including carbon, in the core. In fact, studies have utilised diamond anvil cells to replicate the conditions in the Earth's core, the results of which indicate that iron carbide (Fe_{7}C_{3}) matches the inner core's sound and density velocities considering its temperature and pressure profile. Hence, the iron carbide model could serve as evidence that the core holds as much as 67% of the Earth's carbon. Furthermore, another study found that carbon dissolved in iron and formed a stable phase with the same Fe_{7}C_{3} composition—albeit with a different structure than the one previously mentioned. Hence, although the amount of carbon potentially stored in the Earth's core is not known, recent research indicates that the presence of iron carbides could be consistent with geophysical observations.

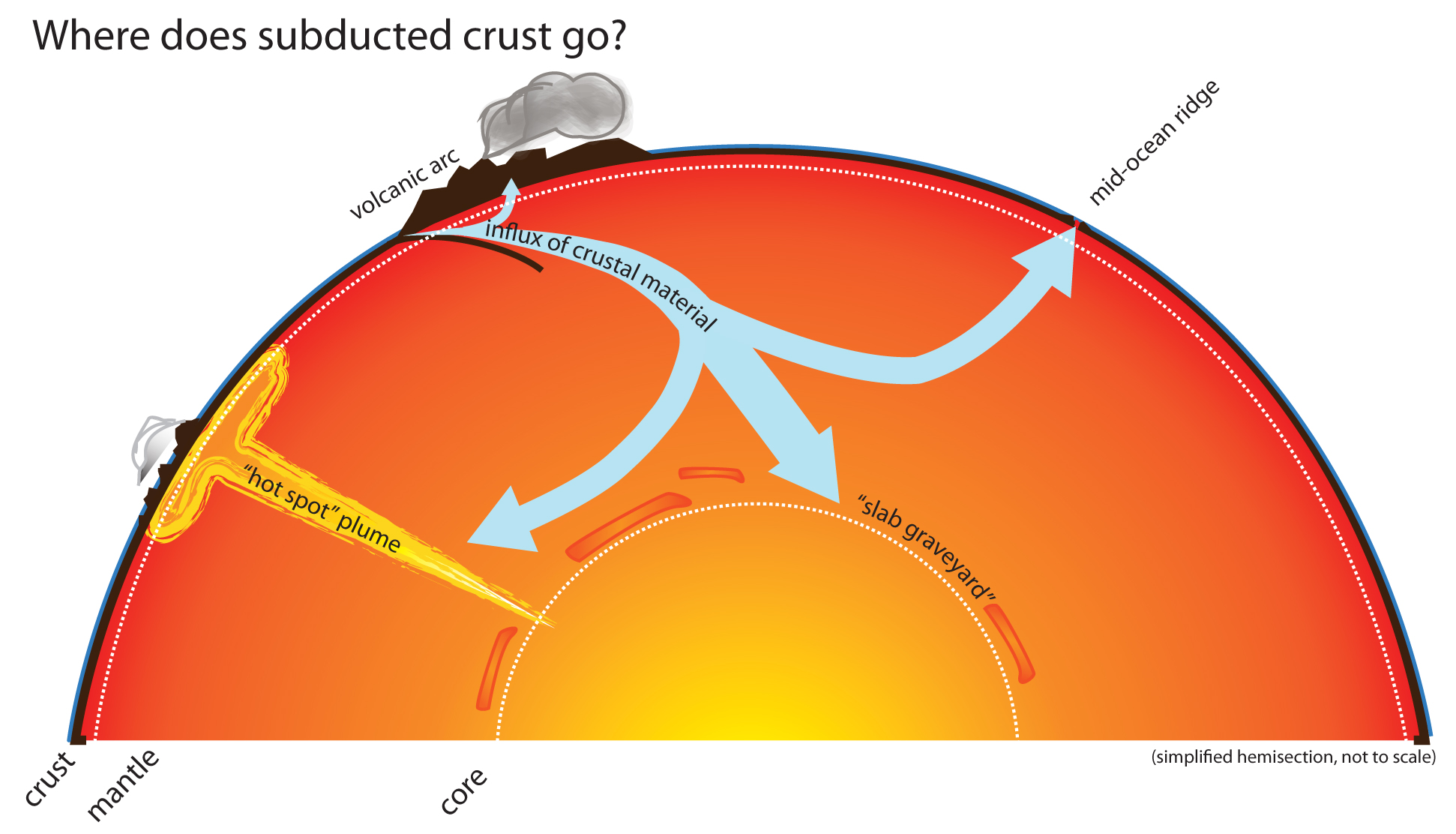
Movement of oceanic plates—which carry carbon compounds—through the mantle

Two models of the carbon content in Earth
Analysis of shear wave velocities has played an integral role in the development of knowledge about carbon's existence in the core

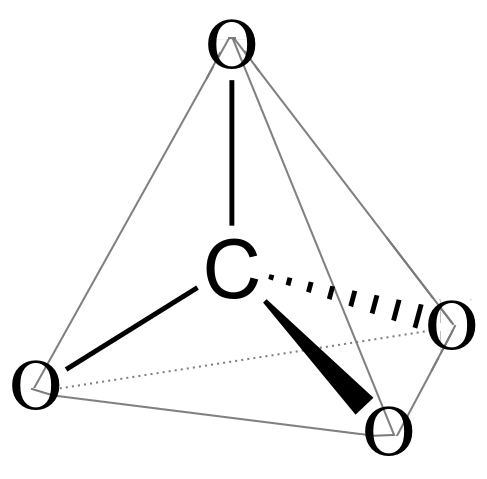
Diagram of carbon tetrahedrally bonded to oxygen

== Fluxes ==
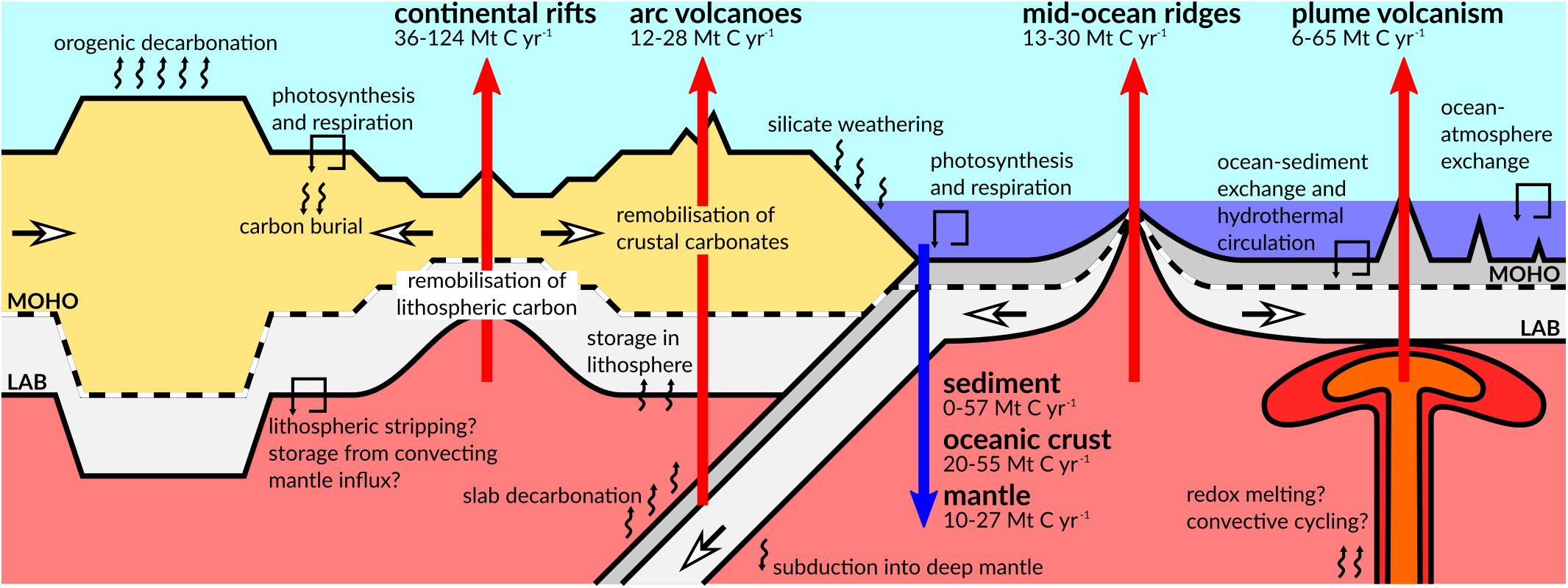
Major fluxes of carbon to, from, and within the Earth’s exogenic and endogenic systems Values give the maximum and minimum fluxes since 200 million years ago. The two major boundaries highlighted are the Mohorovičić discontinuity (crust-mantle boundary; Moho) and the lithosphere-asthenosphere boundary (LAB).

== See also ==
- Deep Carbon Observatory
- Geochemistry of carbon
