= Acanthopleuribacteraceae =

Scientific classification
- Domain: Bacteria
- Kingdom: Pseudomonadati
- Phylum: Acidobacteriota
- Class: Holophagae
- Order: Acanthopleuribacterales; Fukunaga et al. 2008
- Family: Acanthopleuribacteraceae; Fukunaga et al. 2008

Type genus
- Acanthopleuribacter Fukunaga et al. 2008

Genera
- Acanthopleuribacter; Sulfidibacter

Family of bacteria

Acanthopleuribacteraceae is a family of bacteria in the phylum Acidobacteriota.

== Phylogeny ==
The currently accepted taxonomy is based on the List of Prokaryotic names with Standing in Nomenclature (LSPN) and National Center for Biotechnology Information (NCBI).

16S rRNA based LTP_10_2024

- - Acanthopleuribacter Fukunaga et al. 2008
  - Sulfidibacter Wang et al. 2023

120 marker proteins based GTDB 10-RS226

- - Acanthopleuribacter
  - Sulfidibacter

== See also ==
- List of bacterial orders
- List of bacteria genera
