= Holophaga foetida =

Scientific classification
- Domain: Bacteria
- Kingdom: Pseudomonadati
- Phylum: Acidobacteriota
- Class: Holophagae
- Order: Holophagales
- Family: Holophagaceae
- Genus: Holophaga; Liesack et al. 1995
- Species: H. foetida

Binomial name
- Holophaga foetida Liesack et al. 1995

Species of bacterium

Holophaga foetida is a bacterium, the type species of its genus. It is a homoacetogenic bacterium degrading methoxylated aromatic compounds. It is gram-negative, obligately anaerobic and rod-shaped, with type strain TMBS4 (DSM 6591). Its genome has been sequenced. It is known for its ability to anaerobically degrade aromatic compounds and the production of volatile sulfur compounds through a unique pathway.
