= Holophagaceae =

Scientific classification
- Domain: Bacteria
- Kingdom: Pseudomonadati
- Phylum: Acidobacteriota
- Class: Holophagae
- Order: Holophagales; Fukunaga et al. 2008
- Family: Holophagaceae; Fukunaga et al. 2008

Genera
- "Acidiparvus"; Geothrix; Holophaga; Mesoterricola; "Ca. Porrumbacterium"

Family of bacteria

The class Holophagaceae is a family of strictly anaerobic Gram negative marine bacteria in the phylum Acidobacteriota.

== Phylogeny ==
The currently accepted taxonomy is based on the List of Prokaryotic names with Standing in Nomenclature (LSPN) and National Center for Biotechnology Information (NCBI).

16S rRNA based LTP_10_2024

- - - Holophaga
    - Mesoterricola
  - - Mesoterricola sediminis Itoh et al. 2023
    - Geothrix

120 marker proteins based GTDB 10-RS226

- - "Acidiparvus" Wong et al. 2024
  - - - Holophaga Liesack et al. 1995
      - Mesoterricola Itoh et al. 2023
    - Geothrix Coates et al. 1999

== See also ==
- List of bacterial orders
- List of bacteria genera
