= Geochemical cycle =

Pathway that chemical elements take in the surface and crust of the Earth

In Earth science, a geochemical cycle is the pathway that chemical elements undergo to be able to interact with the reservoirs of chemicals in the surface and crust of the Earth. The term "geochemical" tells us that geological and chemical factors are all included. The migration of heated and compressed chemical elements and compounds such as silicon, aluminium, and general alkali metals through the means of subduction and volcanism is known in the geological world as geochemical cycles.

The geochemical cycle encompasses the natural separation and concentration of elements and heat-assisted recombination processes. Changes may not be apparent over a short term, such as with biogeochemical cycles, but over a long term changes of great magnitude occur, including the evolution of continents and oceans.

== Differentiating biogeochemical cycles ==
Some may use the terms biogeochemical cycle and geochemical cycle interchangeably because both cycles deal with Earth's reservoirs. However, a biogeochemical cycle refers to the chemical interactions in surface reservoirs such as the atmosphere, hydrosphere, lithosphere, and biosphere whereas a geochemical cycle refers to the chemical interactions that exist in crustal and sub crustal reservoirs such as the deep earth and lithosphere.

== Earth system ==
The Earth, as a system, is open to radiation from the sun and space, but is practically closed with regard to matter. As all closed systems, it follows the law of conservation of mass which states that matter cannot be created nor destroyed, thus, the matter, although transformed and migrated, remains the same as when the Earth was formed. The Earth system contains seven different reservoirs that are separated into surface reservoirs, which include atmosphere, hydrosphere, biosphere, pedosphere, and lithosphere and the isolated reservoirs that include deep Earth and outer space. Geochemical cycles are concerned with the interactions between deep earth which consists of Earth's mantle and core, and the lithosphere which consists of the Earth's crust.

== Pathways ==
Flux in geochemical cycles is the movement of material between the deep Earth and the surface reservoirs. This occurs through two different processes: volcanism and subduction of tectonic plates.

Subduction is the process that takes place at convergent boundaries by which one tectonic plate moves under another tectonic plate and sinks into the mantle as the plates converge. This leads to the sinking of one plate into the mantle which creates a broad range of geochemical transformations or cycling.

Volcanism is the process that takes place at divergent boundaries by which one tectonic plate separates from another creating a rift in which molten rock (magma) erupts onto the surface of the Earth. This molten rock magma then cools and crystallizes, forming igneous rocks. If crystallization occurs at the Earth's surface, extrusive igneous rocks are formed; if crystallization occurs within the Earth's lithosphere, intrusive igneous rocks are formed which can then be brought to Earth's surface by denudation

== Important cycles ==
Categories and examples of geochemical cycles:

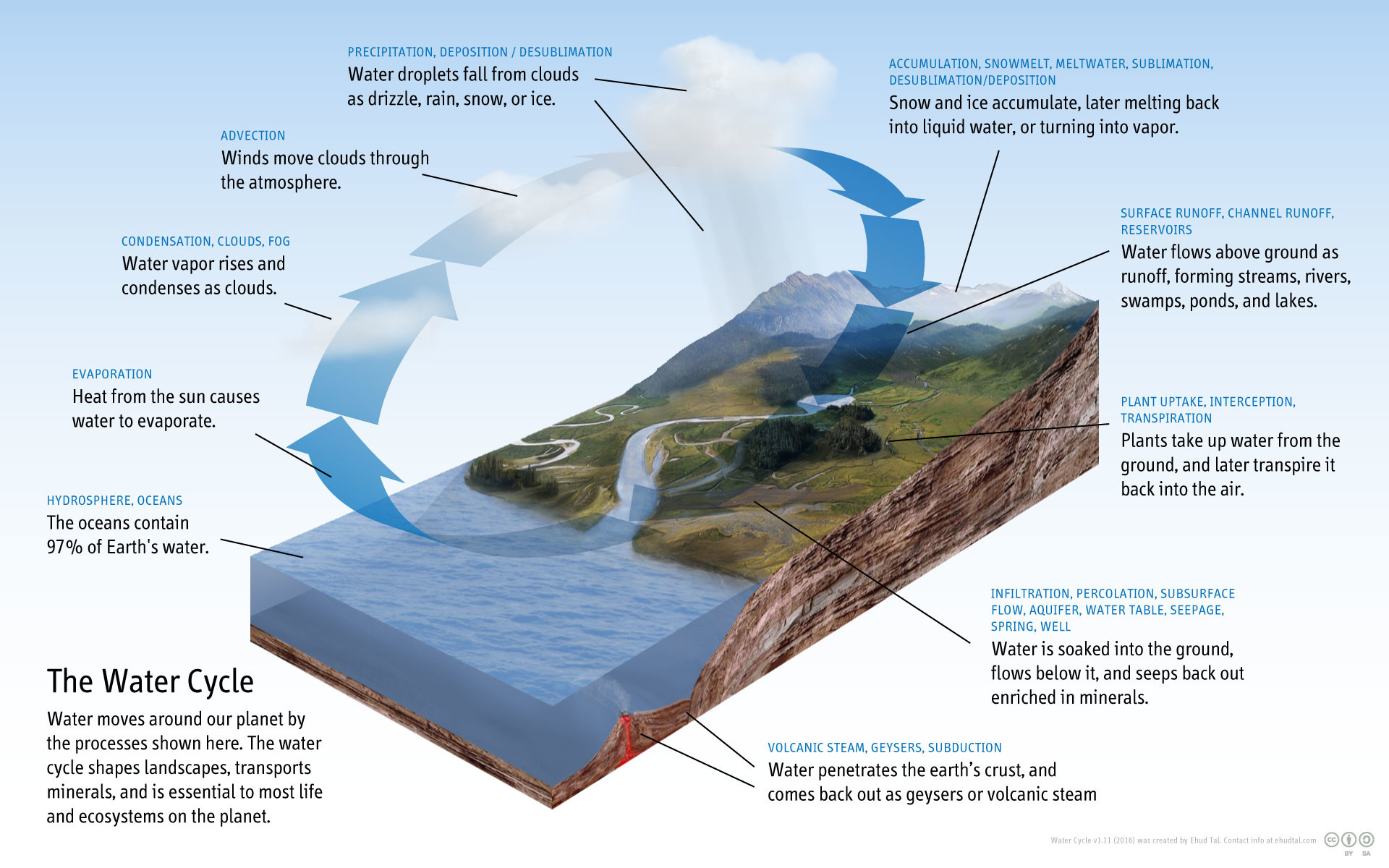
Deep water cycle

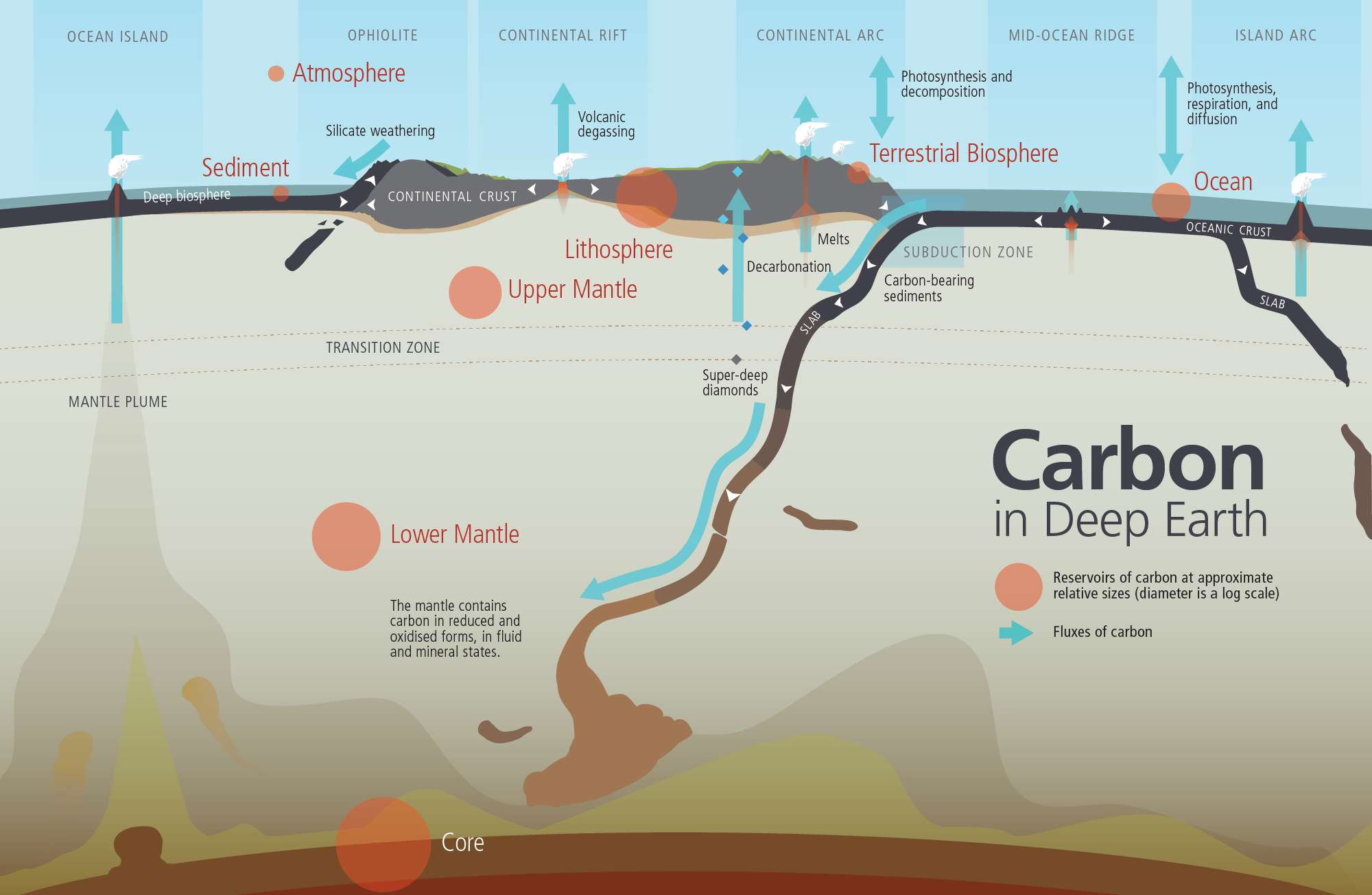
Deep carbon cycle (is part of carbon cycle)

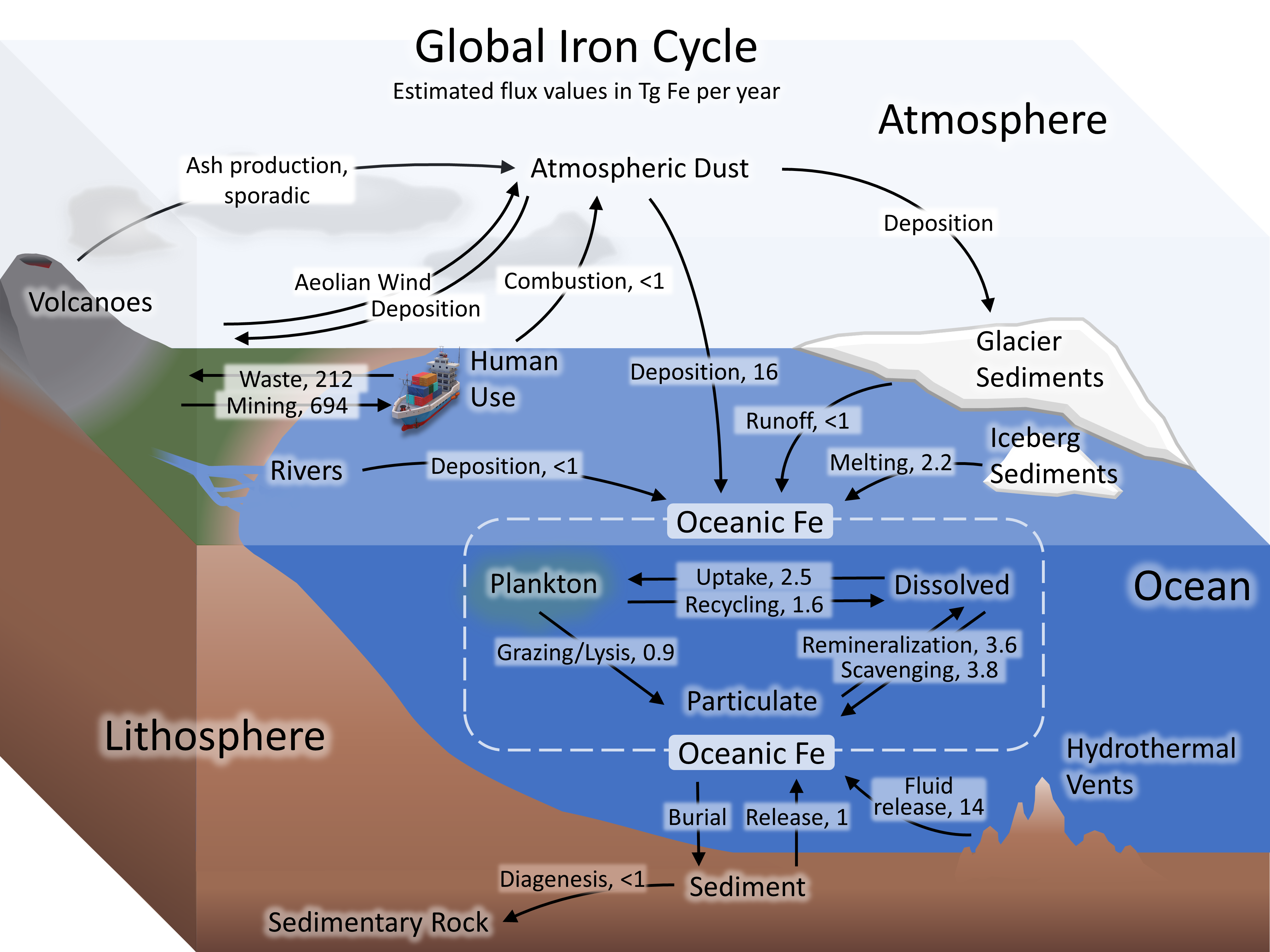
Iron cycle

Carbonate–silicate cycle

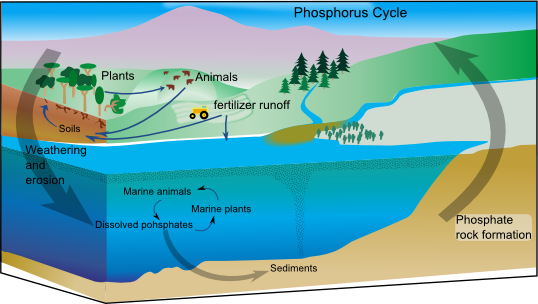
Phosphorus cycle

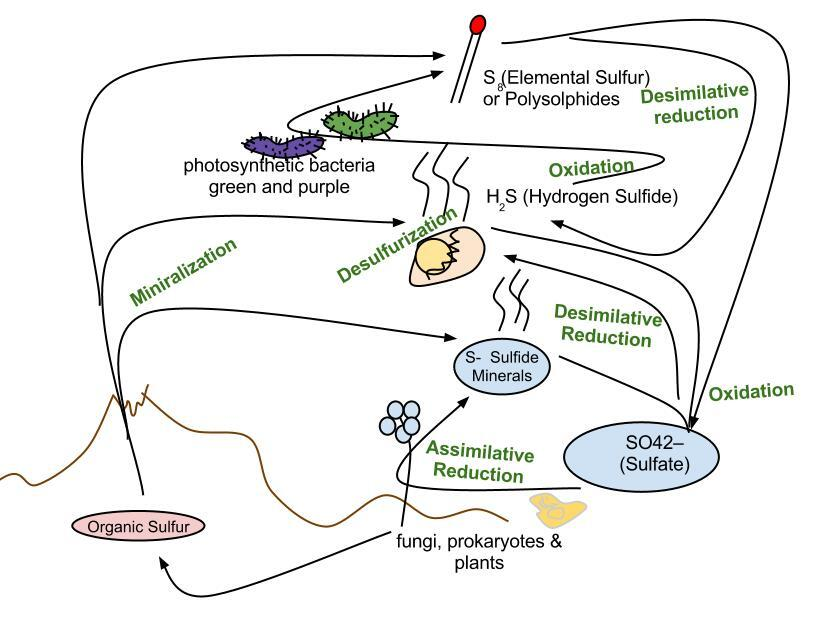
Sulfur cycle

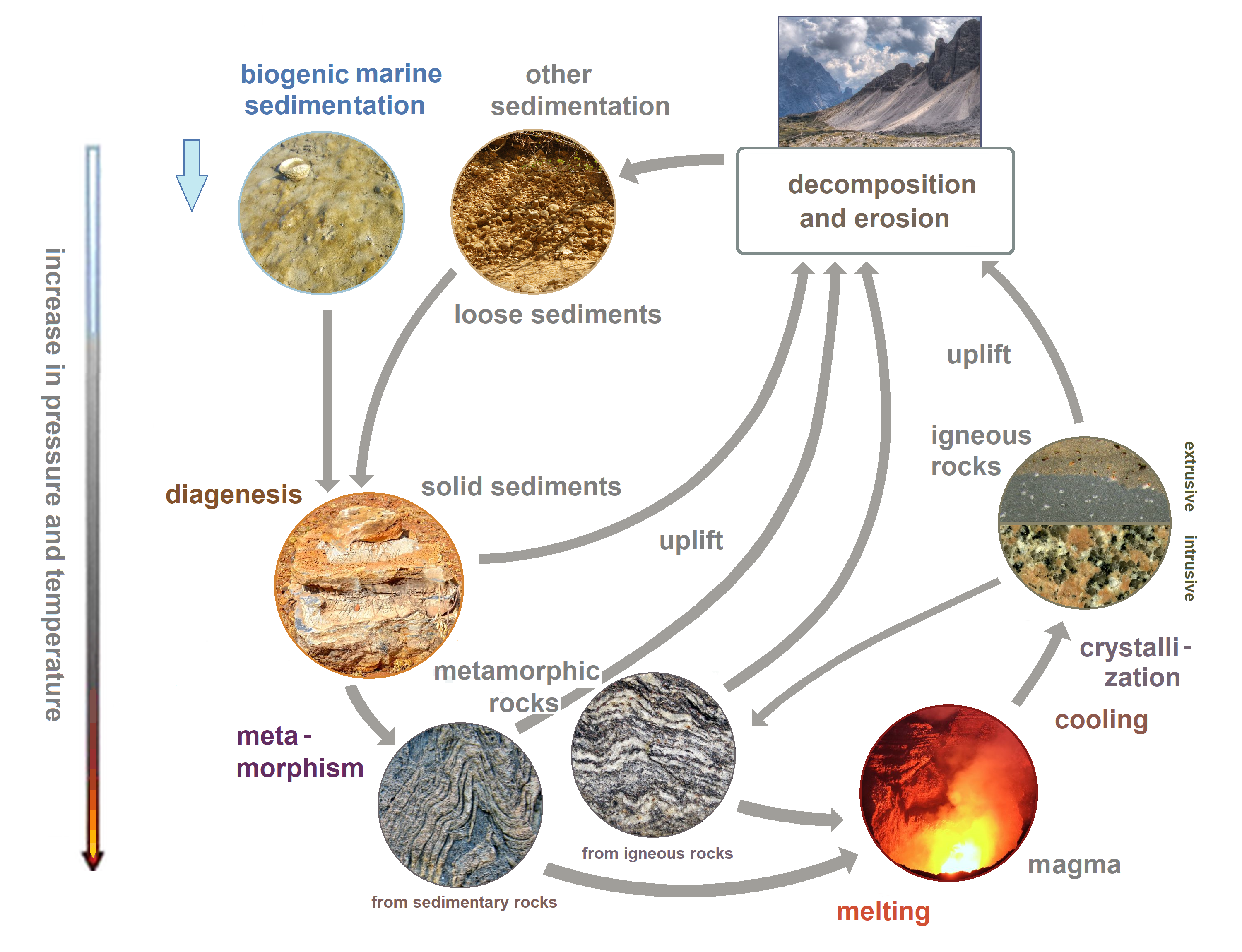
Rock cycle

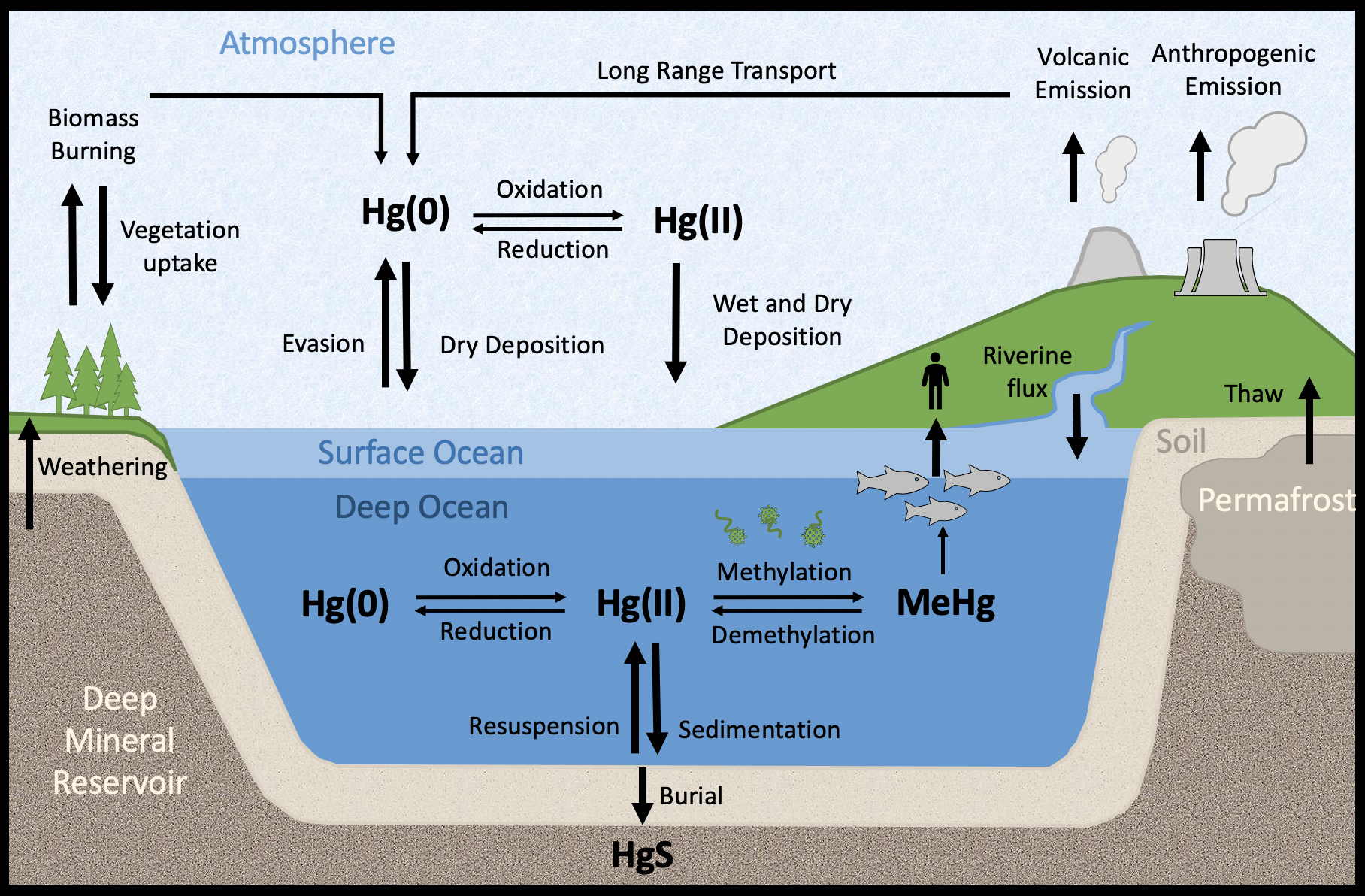
Mercury cycle

== See also ==
- Geotraces
- Ozone–oxygen cycle
