= Geochemistry of carbon =

Study of the transformations involving carbon within the systems of the Earth

The geochemistry of carbon is the study of the transformations involving the element carbon within the systems of the Earth. To a large extent this study is organic geochemistry, but it also includes the very important carbon dioxide. Carbon is transformed by life, and moves between the major phases of the Earth, including the water bodies, atmosphere, and the rocky parts. Carbon is important in the formation of organic mineral deposits, such as coal, petroleum or natural gas. Most carbon is cycled through the atmosphere into living organisms and then respirated back into the atmosphere. However an important part of the carbon cycle involves the trapping of living matter into sediments. The carbon then becomes part of a sedimentary rock when lithification happens. Human technology or natural processes such as weathering, or underground life or water can return the carbon from sedimentary rocks to the atmosphere. From that point it can be transformed in the rock cycle into metamorphic rocks, or melted into igneous rocks. Carbon can return to the surface of the Earth by volcanoes or via uplift in tectonic processes. Carbon is returned to the atmosphere via volcanic gases. Carbon undergoes transformation in the mantle under pressure to diamond and other minerals, and also exists in the Earth's outer core in solution with iron, and may also be present in the inner core.

Carbon can form a huge variety stable compounds. It is an essential component of living matter. Living organisms can live in a limited range of conditions on the Earth that are limited by temperature and the existence of liquid water. The potential habitability of other planets or moons can also be assessed by the existence of liquid water.

Carbon makes up only 0.08% of the combination of the lithosphere, hydrosphere, and atmosphere. Yet it is the twelfth most common element there. In the rock of the lithosphere, carbon commonly occurs as carbonate minerals containing calcium or magnesium. It is also found as fossil fuels in coal and petroleum and gas. Native forms of carbon are much rarer, requiring pressure to form. Pure carbon exists as graphite or diamond.

The deeper parts of Earth such as the mantle are very hard to discover. Few samples are known, in the form of uplifted rocks, or xenoliths. Even fewer remain in the same state they were in where the pressure and temperature is much higher. Some diamonds retain inclusions held at pressures they were formed at, but the temperature is much lower at the surface. Iron meteorites may represent samples of the core of an asteroid, but it would have formed under different conditions to the Earth's core. Therefore, experimental studies are conducted in which minerals or substances are compressed and heated to determine what happens in similar conditions to the planetary interior.

The two common isotopes of carbon are stable. On Earth, carbon 12, ^{12}C is by far the most common at 98.894%. Carbon 13 is much rarer averaging 1.106%. This percentage can vary slightly and its value is important in isotope geochemistry whereby the origin of the carbon is suggested.

== Origins ==
=== Formation ===
Carbon can be produced in stars at least as massive as the Sun by fusion of three helium-4 nuclei: ^{4}He + ^{4}He + ^{4}He --> ^{12}C. This is the triple alpha process. In stars as massive as the Sun, carbon-12 is also converted to carbon-13 and then onto nitrogen-14 by fusion with protons. ^{12}C + ^{1}H --> ^{13}C + e^{+}. ^{13}C + ^{1}H --> ^{14}N. In more massive stars, two carbon nuclei can fuse to magnesium, or a carbon and an oxygen to sulfur.

=== Astrochemistry ===
In molecular clouds, simple carbon molecules are formed, including carbon monoxide and dicarbon. Reactions with the trihydrogen cation of the simple carbon molecules yield carbon containing ions that readily react to form larger organic molecules. Carbon compounds that exist as ions, or isolated gas molecules in the interstellar medium, can condense onto dust grains. Carbonaceous dust grains consist mostly of carbon. Grains can stick together to form larger aggregates.

=== Earth formation ===
Meteorites and interplanetary dust shows the composition of solid material at the start of the Solar System, as they have not been modified since its formation. Carbonaceous chondrites are meteorites with around 5% carbon compounds. Their composition resembles the Sun's minus the very volatile elements like hydrogen and noble gases. The Earth is believed to have formed by the gravitational collapse of material like meteorites.

Important effects on Earth in the first Hadian Era include strong solar winds during the T-Tauri stage of the Sun. The Moon forming impact caused major changes to the surface. Juvenile volatiles outgased from the early molten surface of the Earth. These included carbon dioxide and carbon monoxide. The emissions probably did not include methane, but the Earth was probably free of molecular oxygen. The Late Heavy Bombardment was between 4.0 and 3.8 billion years ago (Ga). To start with, the Earth did not have a crust as it does today. Plate tectonics in its present form commenced about 2.5 Ga.

Early sedimentary rocks formed under water date to 3.8 Ga. Pillow lavas dating from 3.5 Ga prove the existence of oceans. Evidence of early life is given by fossils of stromatolites, and later by chemical tracers.

Organic matter continues to be added to the Earth from space via interplanetary dust, which also includes some interstellar particles. The amounts added to the Earth were around 60,000 tonnes per year about 4 Ga.

== Isotope ==
Biological sequestration of carbon causes enrichment of carbon-12, so that substances that originate from living organisms have a higher carbon-12 content. Due to the kinetic isotope effect, chemical reactions can happen faster with lighter isotopes, so that photosynthesis fixes lighter carbon-12 faster than carbon-13. Also lighter isotopes diffuse across a biological membrane faster. Enrichment in carbon 13 is measured by delta ^{13}C(o/oo) = [(^{13}C/^{12}C)sample/(^{13}C/^{12}C)standard - 1] * 1000. The common standard for carbon is Cretaceous Peedee formation belemnite.

== Stereoisomers ==
Complex molecules, in particular those containing carbon can be in the form of stereoisomers. With abiotic processes they would be expected to be equally likely, but in carbonaceous chondrites this is not the case. The reasons for this are unknown.

== Crust ==
The outer layer of the Earth, the crust along with its outer layers contain about 10^{20} kg of carbon. This is enough for each square meter of the surface to have 200 tons of carbon.

== Sedimentation ==
Carbon added to sedimentary rocks can take the form of carbonates, or organic carbon compounds. In order of source quantity the organic carbon comes from phytoplankton, plants, bacteria and zooplankton. However terrestrial sediments may be mostly from higher plants, and some oxygen deficient sediments from water may be mostly bacteria. Fungi and other animals make insignificant contributions. On the oceans the main contributor of organic matter to sediments is plankton, either dead fragments or faecal pellets termed marine snow. Bacteria degrade this matter in the water column, and the amount surviving to the ocean floor is inversely proportional to the depth. This is accompanied by biominerals consisting of silicates and carbonates. The particulate organic matter in sediments is about 20% of known molecules 80% of material that cannot be analysed. Detritivores consume some of the fallen organic materials. Aerobic bacteria and fungi also consume organic matter in the oxic surface parts of the sediment. Coarse-grained sediments are oxygenated to about half a meter, but fine grained clays may only have a couple of millimetres exposed to oxygen. The organic matter in the oxygenated zone will become completely mineralized if it stays there long enough.

Deeper in sediments where oxygen is exhausted, anaerobic biological processes continue at a slower rate. These include anaerobic mineralization making ammonium, phosphate and sulfide ions; fermentation making short chain alcohols, acids or methyl amines; acetogenesis making acetic acid; methanogenesis making methane, and sulfate, nitrite and nitrate reduction. Carbon dioxide and hydrogen are also outputs. Under freshwater, sulfate is usually very low, so methanogenesis is more important. Yet other bacteria can convert methane, back into living matter, by oxidising with other substrates. Bacteria can reside at great depths in sediments. However sedimentary organic matter accumulates the indigestible components.

Deep bacteria may be lithotrophes, using hydrogen, and carbon dioxide as a carbon source.

In the oceans and other waters there is much dissolved organic materials. These are several thousand years old on average, and are called gelbstoff (yellow substance) particularly in fresh waters. Much of this is tannins. The nitrogen containing materials here appear to be amides, perhaps from peptidoglycans from bacteria. Microorganisms have trouble consuming the high molecular weight dissolved substances, but quickly consume small molecules.

From terrestrial sources black carbon produced by charring is an important component. Fungi are important decomposers in soil.

=== Macromolecules ===
Proteins are normally hydrolysed slowly even without enzymes or bacteria, with a half-life of 460 years, but can be preserved if they are desiccated, pickled or frozen. Being enclosed in bone also helps preservation. Over time the amino acids tend to racemize, and those with more functional groups are lost earlier. Protein still will degrade on the timescale of a million years. DNA degrades rapidly, lasting only about four years in water. Cellulose and chitin have a half-life in water at 25° of about 4.7 million years. Enzymes can accelerate this by a factor of 10^{17}. About 10^{11} tons of chitin are produced each year, but it is almost all degraded.

Lignin is only efficiently degraded by fungi, white rot, or brown rot. These require oxygen.

Lipids are hydrolysed to fatty acids over long time periods. Plant cuticle waxes are very difficult to degrade, and may survive over geological time periods.

=== Preservation ===
More organic matter is preserved in sediments if there is high primary production, or the sediment is fine-grained. The lack of oxygen helps preservation greatly, and that also is caused by a large supply of organic matter. Soil does not usually preserve organic matter, it would need to be acidified or water logged, as in the bog. Rapid burial ensures the material gets to an oxygen free depth, but also dilutes the organic matter. A low energy environment ensures the sediment is not stirred up and oxygenated. Salt marshes and mangroves meet some of these requirements, but unless the sea level is rising will not have a chance to accumulate much. Coral reefs are very productive, but are well oxygenated, and recycle everything before it is buried.

=== Sphagnum bog ===
In dead Sphagnum, sphagnan a polysaccharide with D-lyxo-5-hexosulouronic acid is a major remaining substance. It makes the bog very acidic, so that bacteria cannot grow. Not only that, the plant ensures there is no available nitrogen. Holocellulose also absorbs any digestive enzymes around. Together this leads to major accumulation of peat under sphagnum bogs.

== Mantle ==
Earth's mantle is a significant reservoir of carbon. The mantle contains more carbon than the crust, oceans, biosphere, and atmosphere put together. The figure is estimated to be very roughly 10^{22} kg. Carbon concentration in the mantle is very variable, varying by more than a factor of 100 between different parts.

The form carbon takes depends on its oxidation state, which depends on the oxygen fugacity of the environment. Carbon dioxide and carbonate are found where the oxygen fugacity is high. Lower oxygen fugacity results in diamond formation, first in eclogite, then peridotite, and lastly in fluid water mixtures. At even lower oxygen fugacity, methane is stable in contact with water, and even lower, metallic iron and nickel form along with carbides. Iron carbides include Fe_{3}C and Fe_{7}C_{3}.

Minerals that contain carbon include calcite and its higher density polymorphs. Other significant carbon minerals include magnesium and iron carbonates. Dolomite is stable above 100 km depth. Below 100 km, dolomite reacts with orthopyroxine (found in peridotite) to yield magnesite (an iron magnesium carbonate). Below 200 km deep, carbon dioxide is reduced by ferrous iron (Fe^{2+}), forming diamond, and ferric iron (Fe^{3+}). Even deeper pressure induced disproportionation of iron minerals produces more ferric iron, and metallic iron. The metallic iron combines with carbon to form the mineral cohenite with formula Fe_{3}C. Cohenite also contains some nickel substituting for iron. This form or carbon is called "carbide". Diamond forms in the mantle below 150 km deep, but because it is so durable, it can survive in eruptions to the surface in kimberlites, lamproites, or ultramafic lamprophyres.

Xenoliths can come from the mantle, and different compositions come from different depths. Above 90 km (3.2 GPa) spinel peridotite occurs, below this garnet peridotite is found.

Inclusions trapped in diamond can reveal the material and conditions much deeper in the mantle. Large gem diamonds are usually formed in the transition zone part of the mantle, (410 to 660 km deep) and crystallise from a molten iron-nickel-carbon solution, that also contains sulfur and trace amounts of hydrogen, chromium, phosphorus and oxygen. Carbon atoms constitute about 12% of the melt (about 3% by mass). Inclusions of the crystallised metallic melt are sometimes included in diamonds. Diamond can be caused to precipitate from the liquid metal, by increasing pressure, or by adding sulfur.

Fluid inclusions in crystals from the mantle have contents that most often are liquid carbon dioxide, but which also include carbon oxysulfide, methane and carbon monoxide

Material is added by subduction from the crust. This includes the major carbon containing sediments such as limestone, or coal. Each year 2×10^{11} kg of CO_{2} is transferred from the crust to the mantle by subduction. (1700 tons of carbon per second).

Upwelling mantle material can add to the crust at mid oceanic ridges. Fluids can extract carbon from the mantle and erupt in volcanoes. At 330 km deep a liquid consisting of carbon dioxide and water can form. It is highly corrosive, and dissolves incompatible elements from the solid mantle. These elements include uranium, thorium, potassium, helium and argon. The fluids can then go on to cause metasomatism or extend to the surface in carbonatite eruptions. The total mid oceanic ridge, and hot spot volcanic emissions of carbon dioxide match the loss due to subduction: 2×10^{11} kg of CO_{2} per year.

In slowly convecting mantle rocks, diamond that slowly rises above 150 km will slowly turn into graphite or be oxidised to carbon dioxide or carbonate minerals.

== Core ==
Earth's core is believed to be mostly an alloy of iron and nickel. The density indicates that it also contains a significant amount of lighter elements. Elements such as hydrogen would be stable in the Earth's core, however the conditions at the formation of the core would not be suitable for its inclusion. Carbon is a very likely constituent of the core. Preferential partitioning of the carbon isotope^{12}C into the metallic core, during its formation, may explain why there seems to be more ^{13}C on the surface and mantle of the Earth compared to other solar system bodies (−5‰ compared to -20‰). The difference can also help to predict the value of the carbon proportion of the core.

The outer core has a density around 11 cm^{−3}, and a mass of 1.3×10^{24}kg. It contains roughly 10^{22} kg of carbon. Carbon dissolved in liquid iron affect the solution of other elements. Dissolved carbon changes lead from a siderophile to a lithophile. It has the opposite effect on tungsten and molybdenum, causing more tungsten or molybdenum to dissolve in the metallic phase. The measured amounts of these elements in the rocks compared to the Solar System can be explained by a 0.6% carbon composition of the core.

The inner core is about 1221 km in radius. It has a density of 13 g cm^{−3}, and a total mass of 9×10^{22} kg and a surface area of 18,000,000 square kilometers. Experiments with mixtures under pressure and temperature attempt to reproduce the known properties of the inner and outer core. Carbides are among the first to precipitate from a molten metal mix, and so the inner core may be mostly iron carbides, Fe_{7}C_{3} or Fe_{3}C. At atmospheric pressure (100 kPa) the iron-Fe_{3}C eutectic point is at 4.1% carbon. This percentage decreases as pressure increases to around 50 GPa. Above that pressure the percentage of carbon at the eutectic increases. The pressure on the inner core ranges from 330 GPa to 360 GPa at the centre of the Earth. The temperature at the inner core surface is about 6000 K. The material of the inner core must be stable at the pressure and temperature found there, and more dense than that of the outer core liquid. Extrapolations show that either Fe_{3}C or Fe_{7}C_{3} match the requirements. Fe_{7}C_{3} is 8.4% carbon, and Fe_{3}C is 6.7% carbon. The inner core is growing by about 1 mm per year, or adding about 18 cubic kilometres per year. This is about 18×10^{12} kg of carbon added to the inner core every year. It contains about 8×10^{21} kg of carbon.

== High pressure experimentation ==
In order to determine the fate of natural carbon containing substances deep in the Earth, experiments have been conducted to see what happens when high pressure, and or temperatures are applied. Such substances include carbon dioxide, carbon monoxide, graphite, methane, and other hydrocarbons such as benzene, carbon dioxide water mixtures and carbonate minerals such as calcite, magnesium carbonate, or ferrous carbonate. Under super high pressures carbon may take on a higher coordination number than the four found in sp^{3} compounds like diamond, or the three found in carbonates. Perhaps carbon can substitute into silicates, or form a silicon oxycarbide. Carbides may be possible.

=== Carbon ===
At 15 GPa graphite changes to a hard transparent form, that is not diamond. Diamond is very resistant to pressure, but at about 1 TPa (1000 GPa) transforms to a BC-8 form. But these conditions are not found in the Earth.

=== Carbides ===
Carbides are predicted to be more likely lower in the mantle as experiments have shown a much lower oxygen fugacity for high pressure iron silicates. Cohenite remains stable to over 187 GPa, but is predicted to have a denser orthorhombic Cmcm form in the inner core.

=== Carbon dioxide ===
Under 0.3 GPa pressure, carbon dioxide is stable at room temperature in the same form as dry ice. Over 0.5 GPa carbon dioxide forms a number of different solid forms containing molecules. At pressures over 40 GPa and high temperatures, carbon dioxide forms a covalent solid that contains CO_{4} tetrahedra, and has the same structure as β-cristobalite. This is called phase V or CO_{2}-V. When CO_{2}-V is subjected to high temperatures, or higher pressures, experiments show it breaks down to form diamond and oxygen. In the mantle the geotherm would mean that carbon dioxide would be a liquid till a pressure of 33 GPa, then it would adopt the solid CO_{2}-V form till 43 GPa, and deeper than that would make diamond and fluid oxygen.

=== Carbonyls ===
High pressure carbon monoxide forms the high energy polycarbonyl covalent solid, however it is not expected to be present inside the Earth.

=== Hydrocarbons ===
Under 1.59 GPa pressure at 25 °C, methane converts to a cubic solid. The molecules are rotationally disordered. But over 5.25 GPa the molecules become locked into position and cannot spin. Other hydrocarbons under high pressure have hardly been studied.

=== Carbonates ===
Calcite changes to calcite-II and calcite-III at pressures of 1.5, and 2.2 GPa. Siderite undergoes a chemical change at 10 GPa at 1800K to form Fe_{4}O_{5}. Dolomite decomposes 7GPa and below 1000 °C to yield aragonite and magnesite. However, there are forms of iron containing dolomite stable at higher pressures and temperatures. Over 130 GPa aragonite undergoes a transformation to a SP^{3} tetrahedrally connected carbon, in a covalent network in a C222_{1} structure. Magnesite can survive 80 GPa, but with more than 100 GPa (as at a depth of 1800 km it changes to forms with three-member rings of CO_{4} tetrahedra (C_{3}O_{9}^{6−}). If iron is present in this mineral, at these pressures it will convert to magnetite and diamond. Melted carbonates with SP^{3} carbon are predicted to be very viscous.

Some minerals that contain both silicate and carbonate exist, spurrite and tilleyite. But high-pressure forms have not been studied. There have been attempts to make silicon carbonate. Six coordinated silicates mixed with carbonate should not exist on Earth, but may exist on more massive planets.

== See also ==
- Carbon-based life
- Carbon source (biology)
- Cell biology
- CHONPS, a mnemonic acronym for the order of the most common elements in living organisms: carbon, hydrogen, oxygen, nitrogen, phosphorus, and sulfur

== Extra reading ==
- Plank, Terry; Manning, Craig E. (17 October 2019). "Subducting carbon". Nature. 574 (7778): 343–352. Bibcode:2019Natur.574..343P. doi:10.1038/s41586-019-1643-z. PMID 31619791.
