= Holophagae =

Scientific classification
- Domain: Bacteria
- Kingdom: Pseudomonadati
- Phylum: Acidobacteriota
- Class: Holophagae; Fukunaga et al. 2008

Type genus
- Holophaga Liesack et al. 1995

Orders
- Acanthopleuribacterales; Holophagales; Thermotomaculales

Synonyms
- "Holophagia" Oren, Parte & Garrity 2016

Class of bacteria

Holophagae is a class of Acidobacteriota.

== Phylogeny ==
The currently accepted taxonomy is based on the List of Prokaryotic names with Standing in Nomenclature and National Center for Biotechnology Information (NCBI). Numbered orders do not yet have any cultured representatives.

16S rRNA based phylogeny

- - Order 6-4
  - - Order 6-3
    - - Order 6-2
      - - Thermotomaculales
        - - Acanthopleuribacterales
          - Holophagales

16S rRNA based LTP_10_2024

- - Holophagales
    Holophagaceae

- - Thermotomaculales
    Thermotomaculaceae
  - Acanthopleuribacterales
    Acanthopleuribacteraceae

120 marker proteins based GTDB 10-RS226

- - - Thermotomaculales
      Thermotomaculaceae
  - - Acanthopleuribacterales
      Acanthopleuribacteraceae
    - Holophagales
      Holophagaceae

== See also ==
- List of bacterial orders
- List of bacteria genera
