= Carbon cycle =

Natural processes of carbon exchange

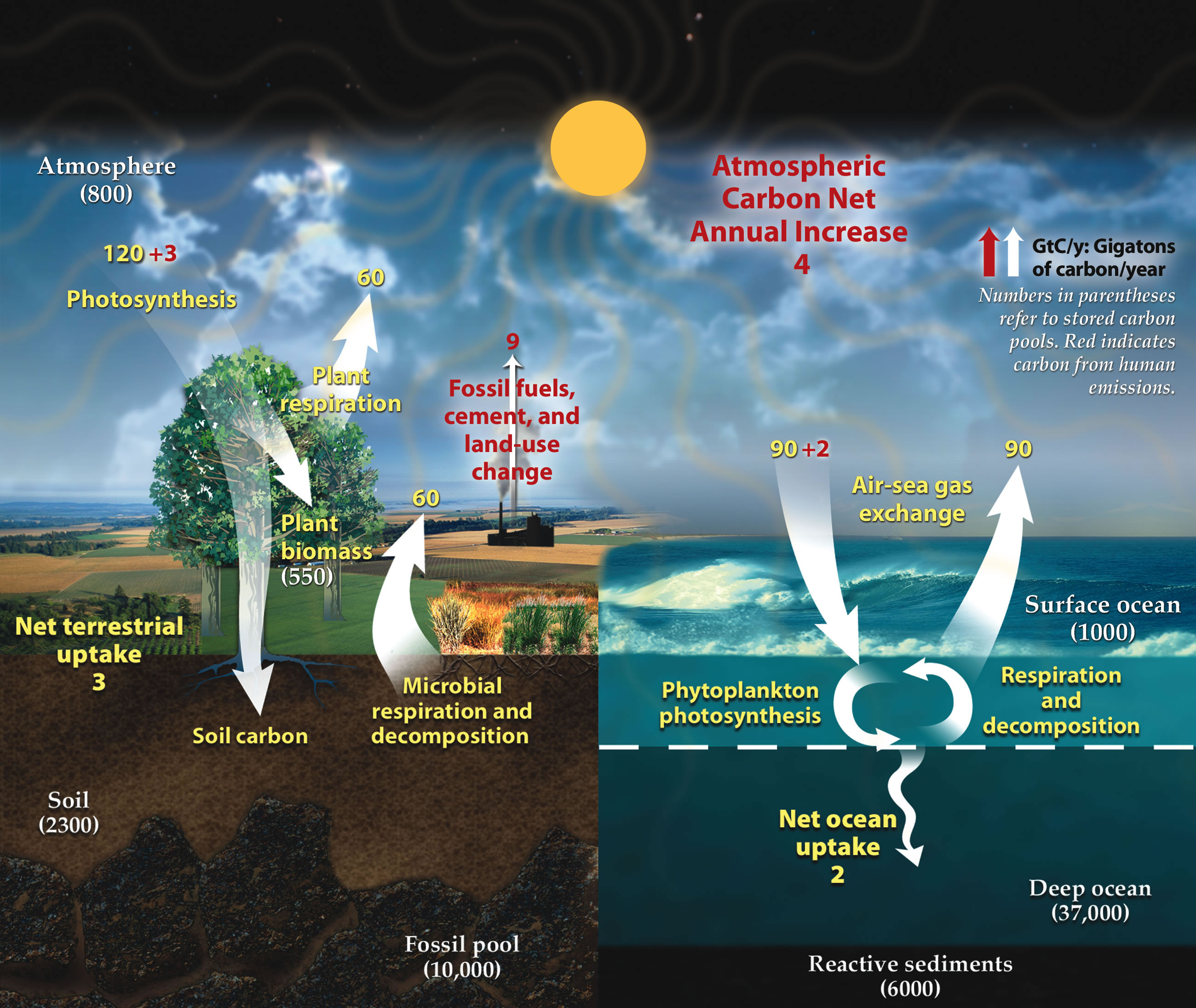
Carbon cycle schematic showing the movement of carbon between land, atmosphere, and oceans in billions of tons (gigatons) per year. Yellow numbers are natural fluxes, red are human contributions, and white are stored carbon. The effects of the slow (or deep) carbon cycle, such as volcanic and tectonic activity are not included.

The carbon cycle is a part of the biogeochemical cycle where carbon is exchanged among the biosphere, pedosphere, geosphere, hydrosphere, and atmosphere of Earth. Other major biogeochemical cycles include the nitrogen cycle and the water cycle. Carbon is the main component of biological compounds as well as a major component of many rocks such as limestone. The carbon cycle comprises a sequence of events that are key to making Earth capable of sustaining life. It describes the movement of carbon as it is recycled and reused throughout the biosphere, as well as long-term processes of carbon sequestration (storage) to and release from carbon sinks. At 422.7 parts per million (ppm), the global average atmospheric carbon dioxide has set a new record high in 2024.

To describe the dynamics of the carbon cycle, a distinction can be made between the fast and slow carbon cycle. The fast cycle is also referred to as the biological carbon cycle. Fast cycles can complete within years, moving substances from atmosphere to biosphere, then back to the atmosphere. Slow or geological cycles (also called deep carbon cycle) can take millions of years to complete, moving substances through the Earth's crust between rocks, soil, ocean and atmosphere.

Humans have disturbed the carbon cycle for many centuries. They have done so by modifying land use and by mining and burning carbon from ancient organic remains (coal, petroleum and gas). Carbon dioxide in the atmosphere has increased nearly 52% over pre-industrial levels by 2020, resulting in global warming. The increased carbon dioxide has also caused a reduction in the ocean's pH value and is fundamentally altering marine chemistry. Carbon dioxide is critical for photosynthesis.

== Main compartments ==
The carbon cycle was first described by Antoine Lavoisier and Joseph Priestley, and popularised by Humphry Davy. The global carbon cycle is now usually divided into the following major reservoirs of carbon (also called carbon pools) interconnected by pathways of exchange:

- Atmosphere
- Terrestrial biosphere
- Ocean, including dissolved inorganic carbon and living and non-living marine biota
- Sediments, including fossil fuels, freshwater systems, and non-living organic material.
- Earth's interior (mantle and crust). These carbon stores interact with the other components through geological processes.

The carbon exchanges between reservoirs occur as the result of various chemical, physical, geological, and biological processes. The ocean contains the largest active pool of carbon near the surface of the Earth. The natural flows of carbon between the atmosphere, ocean, terrestrial ecosystems, and sediments are fairly balanced; so carbon levels would be roughly stable without human influence.

=== Atmosphere ===
Computer model showing a year in the life of atmospheric carbon dioxide and how it travels around the globe

Carbon in the Earth's atmosphere exists in two main forms: carbon dioxide and methane. Both of these gases absorb and retain heat in the atmosphere and are partially responsible for the greenhouse effect. Methane produces a larger greenhouse effect per volume as compared to carbon dioxide, but it exists in much lower concentrations and is more short-lived than carbon dioxide. Thus, carbon dioxide contributes more to the global greenhouse effect than methane.

Carbon dioxide is removed from the atmosphere primarily through photosynthesis and enters the terrestrial and oceanic biospheres. Carbon dioxide also dissolves directly from the atmosphere into bodies of water (ocean, lakes, etc.), as well as dissolving in precipitation as raindrops fall through the atmosphere. When dissolved in water, carbon dioxide reacts with water molecules and forms carbonic acid, which contributes to ocean acidity. It can then be absorbed by rocks through weathering. It also can acidify other surfaces it touches or be washed into the ocean.

CO_{2} concentrations over the last 800,000 years as measured from ice cores (blue/green) and directly (black)

Human activities over the past two centuries have increased the amount of carbon in the atmosphere by nearly 50% as of year 2020, mainly in the form of carbon dioxide, both by modifying ecosystems' ability to extract carbon dioxide from the atmosphere and by emitting it directly, e.g., by burning fossil fuels and manufacturing concrete.

In the far future (2 to 3 billion years), the rate at which carbon dioxide is absorbed into the soil via the carbonate–silicate cycle will likely increase due to expected changes in the Sun as it ages. The expected increased luminosity of the Sun will likely speed up the rate of surface weathering. This will eventually cause most of the carbon dioxide in the atmosphere to be squelched into the Earth's crust as carbonate. Once the concentration of carbon dioxide in the atmosphere falls below approximately 50 parts per million (tolerances vary among species), C_{3} photosynthesis will no longer be possible. This has been predicted to occur 600 million years from the present, though models vary.

Once the oceans on the Earth evaporate in about 1.1 billion years from now, plate tectonics will very likely stop due to the lack of water to lubricate them. The lack of volcanoes pumping out carbon dioxide will cause the carbon cycle to end between 1 billion and 2 billion years into the future.

=== Terrestrial biosphere ===
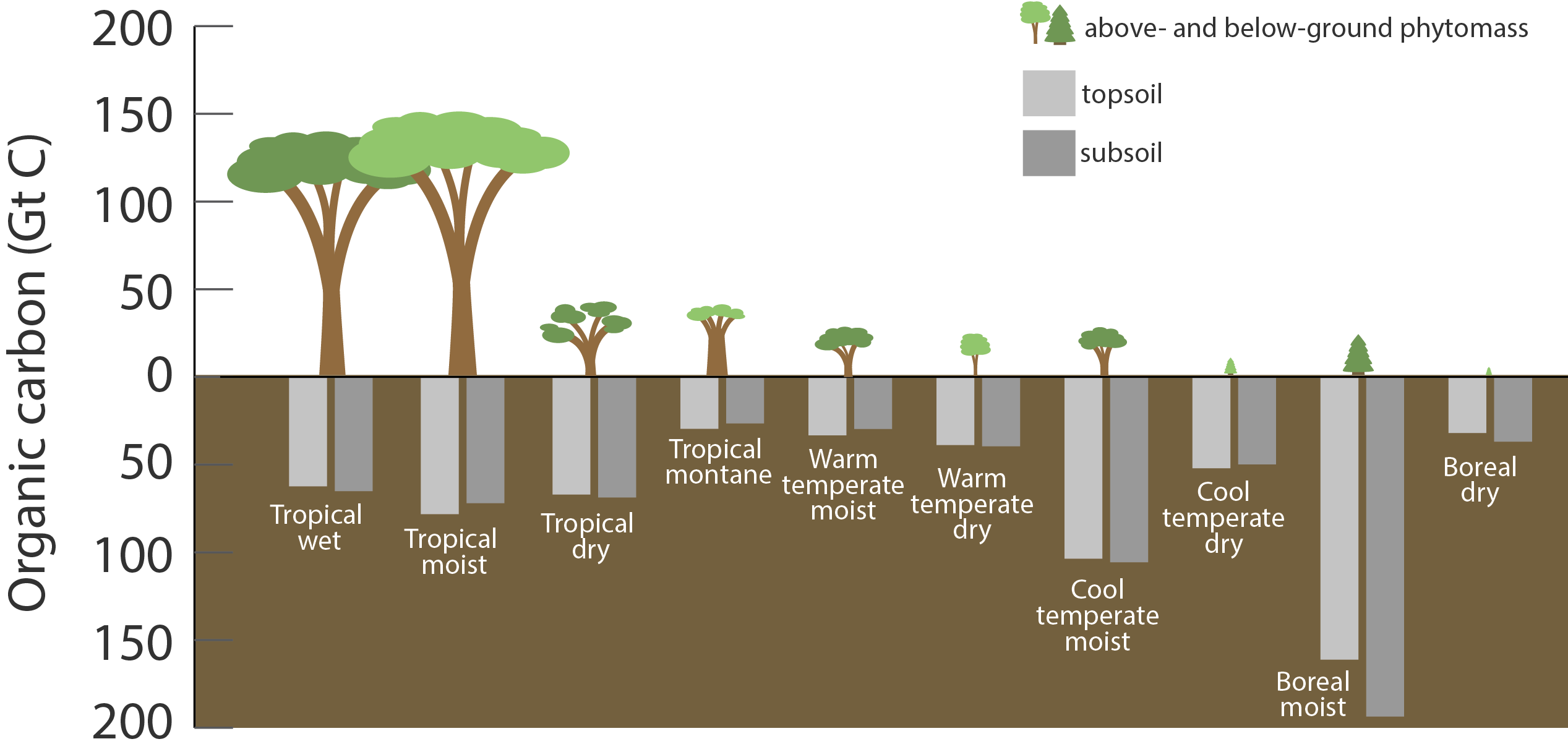
Amount of carbon stored in Earth's various terrestrial ecosystems, in gigatonnes

The terrestrial biosphere includes the organic carbon in all land-living organisms, both alive and dead, as well as carbon stored in soils. About 500 gigatons of carbon are stored above ground in plants and other living organisms, while soil holds approximately 1,500 gigatons of carbon. Most carbon in the terrestrial biosphere is organic carbon, while about a third of soil carbon is stored in inorganic forms, such as calcium carbonate. Organic carbon is a major component of all organisms living on Earth. Autotrophs extract it from the air in the form of carbon dioxide, converting it to organic carbon, while heterotrophs receive carbon by consuming other organisms.

Because carbon uptake in the terrestrial biosphere is dependent on biotic factors, it follows a diurnal and seasonal cycle. In CO_{2} measurements, this feature is apparent in the Keeling curve. It is strongest in the northern hemisphere because this hemisphere has more land mass than the southern hemisphere and thus more room for ecosystems to absorb and emit carbon.

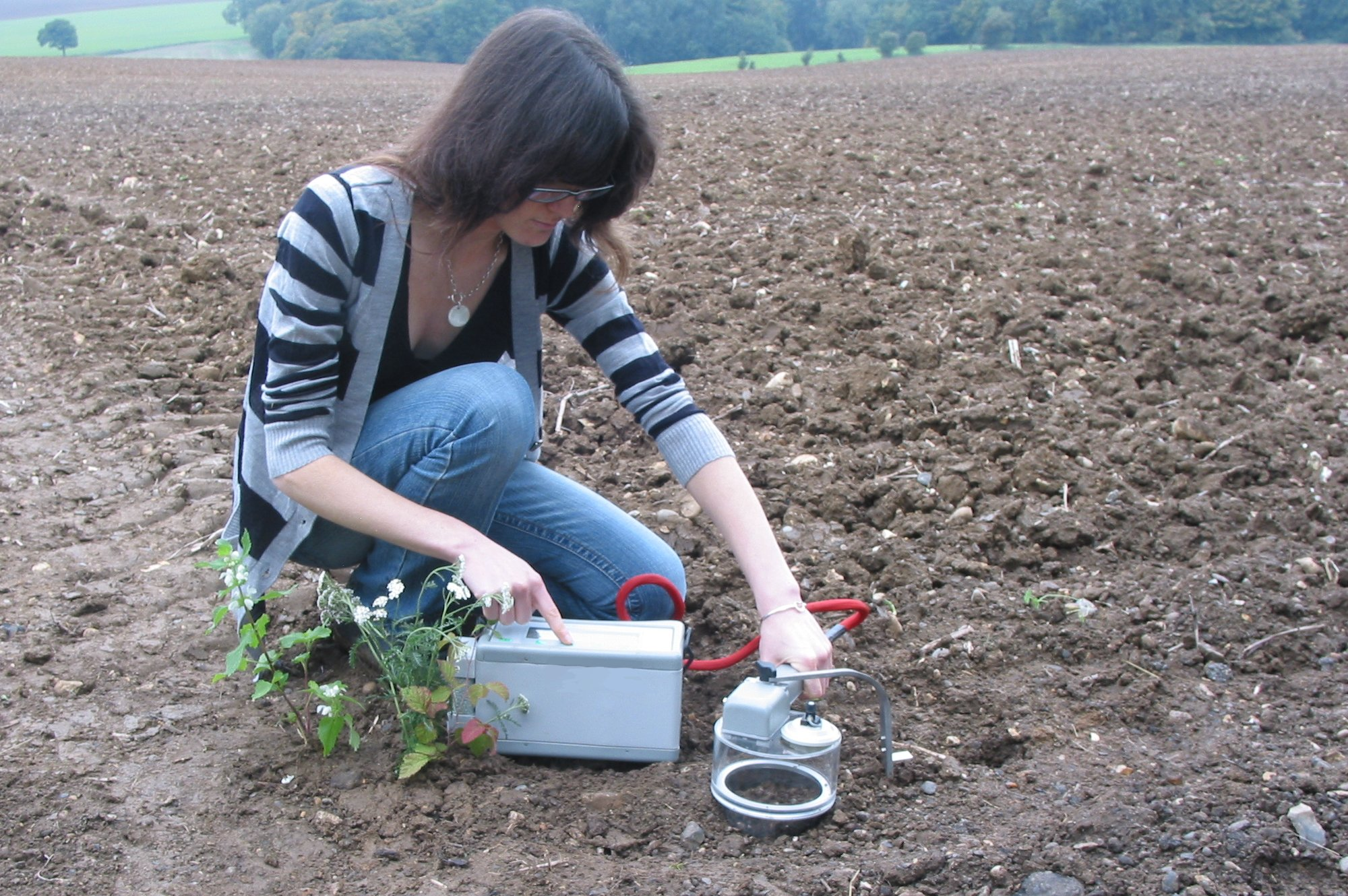
A portable soil respiration system measuring soil CO_{2} flux

Carbon leaves the terrestrial biosphere in several ways and on different time scales. The combustion or respiration of organic carbon releases it rapidly into the atmosphere. It can also be exported into the ocean through rivers or remain sequestered in soils in the form of inert carbon. Carbon stored in soil can remain there for up to thousands of years before being washed into rivers by erosion or released into the atmosphere through soil respiration. Between 1989 and 2008 soil respiration increased by about 0.1% per year. In 2008, the global total of CO_{2} released by soil respiration was roughly 98 billion tonnes, about 3 times more carbon than humans are now putting into the atmosphere each year by burning fossil fuel (this does not represent a net transfer of carbon from soil to atmosphere, as the respiration is largely offset by inputs to soil carbon). There are a few plausible explanations for this trend, but the most likely explanation is that increasing temperatures have increased rates of decomposition of soil organic matter, which has increased the flow of CO_{2}. The length of carbon sequestering in soil is dependent on local climatic conditions and thus changes in the course of climate change.

Size of major carbon pools on the Earth (year 2000 estimates)
Pool	Quantity (gigatons)
Atmosphere	720
Ocean (total)	38,400
Total inorganic	37,400
Total organic	1,000
Surface layer	670
Deep layer	36,730
Lithosphere	
Sedimentary carbonates	> 60,000,000
Kerogens	15,000,000
Terrestrial biosphere (total)	2,000
Living biomass	600 – 1,000
Dead biomass	1,200
Aquatic biosphere	1 – 2
Fossil fuels (total)	4,130
Coal	3,510
Oil	230
Gas	140
Other (peat)	250

=== Ocean ===
The ocean can be conceptually divided into a surface layer within which water makes frequent (daily to annual) contact with the atmosphere, and a deep layer below the typical mixed layer depth of a few hundred meters or less, within which the time between consecutive contacts may be centuries. The dissolved inorganic carbon (DIC) in the surface layer is exchanged rapidly with the atmosphere, maintaining equilibrium. Partly because its concentration of DIC is about 15% higher but mainly due to its larger volume, the deep ocean contains far more carbon—it is the largest pool of actively cycled carbon in the world, containing 50 times more than the atmosphere—but the timescale to reach equilibrium with the atmosphere is hundreds of years: the exchange of carbon between the two layers, driven by thermohaline circulation, is slow.

Carbon enters the ocean mainly through the dissolution of atmospheric carbon dioxide, a small fraction of which is converted into carbonate. It can also enter the ocean through rivers as dissolved organic carbon. It is converted by organisms into organic carbon through photosynthesis and can either be exchanged throughout the food chain or precipitated into the oceans' deeper, more carbon-rich layers as dead soft tissue or in shells as calcium carbonate. It circulates in this layer for long periods of time before either being deposited as sediment or, eventually, returned to the surface waters through thermohaline circulation.

Oceans are basic (with a current pH value of 8.1 to 8.2). The increase in atmospheric CO_{2} shifts the pH of the ocean towards neutral in a process called ocean acidification. Oceanic absorption of CO_{2} is one of the most important forms of carbon sequestering. The projected rate of pH reduction could slow the biological precipitation of calcium carbonates, thus decreasing the ocean's capacity to absorb CO_{2}.

=== Geosphere ===
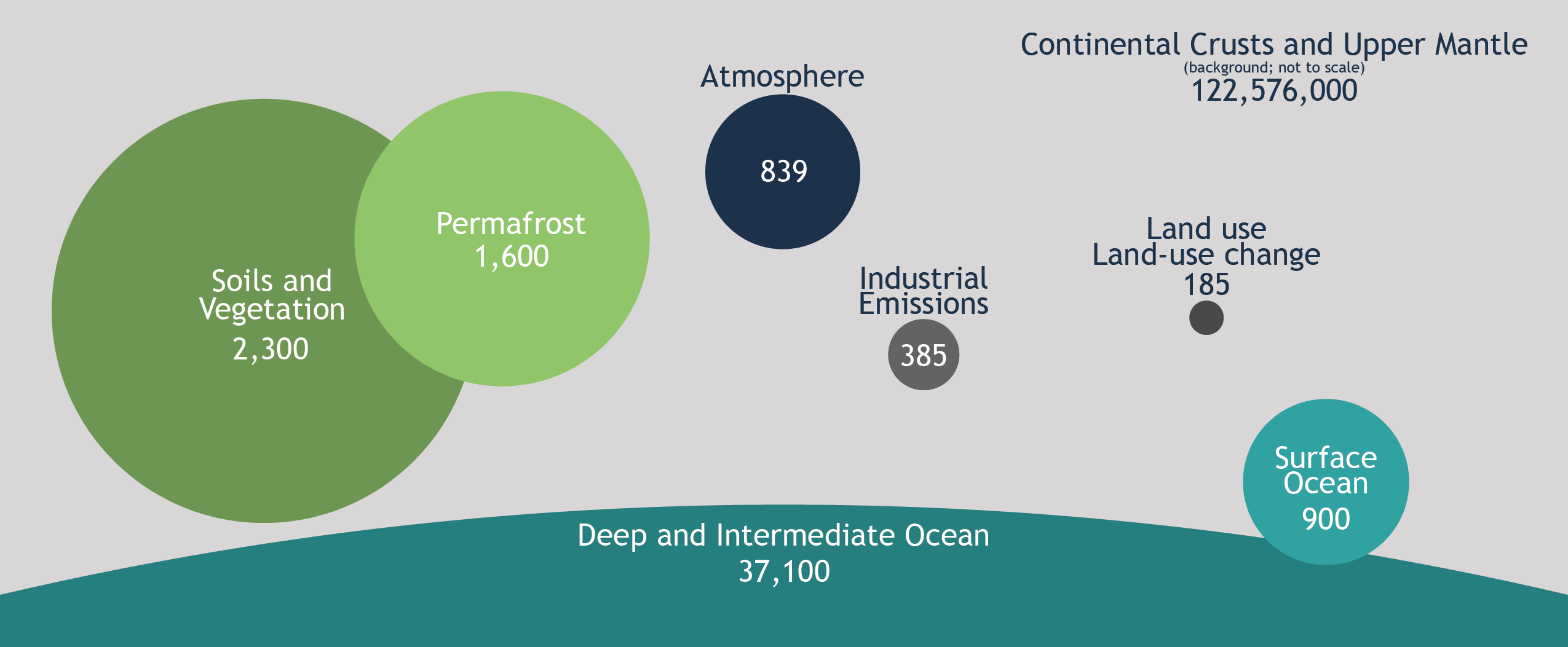
Diagram showing relative sizes (in gigatonnes) of the main storage pools of carbon on Earth. Cumulative changes (thru year 2014) from land use and emissions of fossil carbon are included for comparison.

The geologic component of the carbon cycle operates slowly in comparison to the other parts of the global carbon cycle. It is one of the most important determinants of the amount of carbon in the atmosphere, and thus of global temperatures.

Most of the Earth's carbon is stored inertly in the Earth's lithosphere. Much of the carbon stored in the Earth's mantle was stored there when the Earth formed. Some of it was deposited in the form of organic carbon from the biosphere. Of the carbon stored in the geosphere, about 80% is limestone and its derivatives, which form from the sedimentation of calcium carbonate stored in the shells of marine organisms. The remaining 20% is stored as kerogens formed through the sedimentation and burial of terrestrial organisms under high heat and pressure. Organic carbon stored in the geosphere can remain there for millions of years.

Carbon can leave the geosphere in several ways. Carbon dioxide is released during the metamorphism of carbonate rocks when they are subducted into the Earth's mantle. This carbon dioxide can be released into the atmosphere and ocean through volcanoes and hotspots. It can also be removed by humans through the direct extraction of kerogens in the form of fossil fuels. After extraction, fossil fuels are burned to release energy and emit the carbon they store into the atmosphere.

== Types of dynamic ==
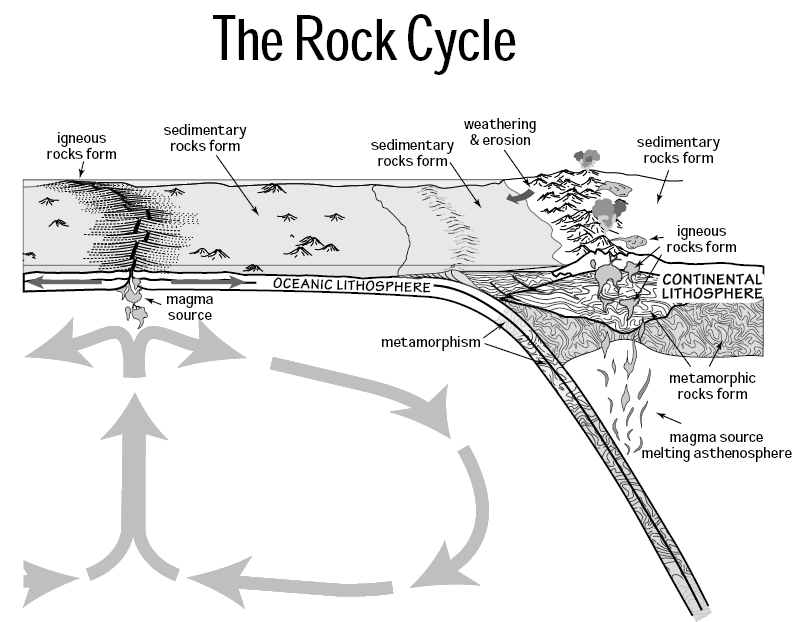
The slow (or deep) carbon cycle operates through rocks. The fast carbon cycle operates through the biosphere, see diagram at start of article ↑.

There is a fast and a slow carbon cycle. The fast cycle operates in the biosphere and the slow cycle operates in rocks. The fast or biological cycle can complete within years, moving carbon from atmosphere to biosphere, then back to the atmosphere. The slow or geological cycle may extend deep into the mantle and can take millions of years to complete, moving carbon through the Earth's crust between rocks, soil, ocean and atmosphere.

The fast carbon cycle involves relatively short-term biogeochemical processes between the environment and living organisms in the biosphere (see diagram at start of article). It includes movements of carbon between the atmosphere and terrestrial and marine ecosystems, as well as soils and seafloor sediments. The fast cycle includes annual cycles involving photosynthesis and decadal cycles involving vegetative growth and decomposition. The reactions of the fast carbon cycle to human activities will determine many of the more immediate impacts of climate change.

The slow (or deep) carbon cycle involves medium to long-term geochemical processes belonging to the rock cycle (see diagram on the right). The exchange between the ocean and atmosphere can take centuries, and the weathering of rocks can take millions of years. Carbon in the ocean precipitates to the ocean floor where it can form sedimentary rock and be subducted into the Earth's mantle. Mountain building processes result in the return of this geologic carbon to the Earth's surface. There the rocks are weathered and carbon is returned to the atmosphere by degassing and to the ocean by rivers. Other geologic carbon returns to the ocean through the hydrothermal emission of calcium ions. In a given year between 10 and 100 million tonnes of carbon moves around this slow cycle. This includes volcanoes returning geologic carbon directly to the atmosphere in the form of carbon dioxide. However, this is less than one percent of the carbon dioxide put into the atmosphere by burning fossil fuels.

== Processes within fast carbon cycle ==
=== Terrestrial carbon in the water cycle ===
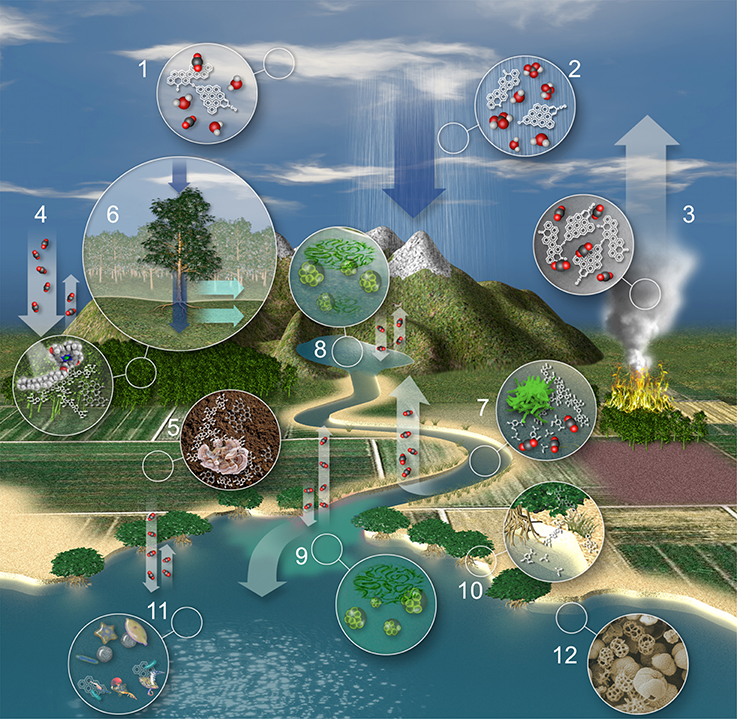
Where terrestrial carbon goes when water flows

The movement of terrestrial carbon in the water cycle is shown in the diagram on the right and explained below:

1. Atmospheric particles act as cloud condensation nuclei, promoting cloud formation.
2. Raindrops absorb organic and inorganic carbon through particle scavenging and adsorption of organic vapors while falling toward Earth.
3. Burning and volcanic eruptions produce highly condensed polycyclic aromatic molecules (i.e. black carbon) that is returned to the atmosphere along with greenhouse gases such as CO_{2}.
4. Terrestrial plants fix atmospheric CO_{2} through photosynthesis, returning a fraction back to the atmosphere through respiration. Lignin and celluloses represent as much as 80% of the organic carbon in forests and 60% in pastures.
5. Litterfall and root organic carbon mix with sedimentary material to form organic soils where plant-derived and petrogenic organic carbon is both stored and transformed by microbial and fungal activity.
6. Water absorbs plant and settled aerosol-derived dissolved organic carbon (DOC) and dissolved inorganic carbon (DIC) as it passes over forest canopies (i.e. throughfall) and along plant trunks/stems (i.e. stemflow). Biogeochemical transformations take place as water soaks into soil solution and groundwater reservoirs and overland flow occurs when soils are completely saturated, or rainfall occurs more rapidly than saturation into soils.
7. Organic carbon derived from the terrestrial biosphere and in situ primary production is decomposed by microbial communities in rivers and streams along with physical decomposition (i.e. photo-oxidation), resulting in a flux of CO_{2} from rivers to the atmosphere that are the same order of magnitude as the amount of carbon sequestered annually by the terrestrial biosphere. Terrestrially-derived macromolecules such as lignin and black carbon are decomposed into smaller components and monomers, ultimately being converted to CO_{2}, metabolic intermediates, or biomass.
8. Lakes, reservoirs, and floodplains typically store large amounts of organic carbon and sediments, but also experience net heterotrophy in the water column, resulting in a net flux of CO_{2} to the atmosphere that is roughly one order of magnitude less than rivers. Methane production is also typically high in the anoxic sediments of floodplains, lakes, and reservoirs.
9. Primary production is typically enhanced in river plumes due to the export of fluvial nutrients. Nevertheless, estuarine waters are a source of CO_{2} to the atmosphere, globally.
10. Coastal marshes both store and export blue carbon. Marshes and wetlands are suggested to have an equivalent flux of CO_{2} to the atmosphere as rivers, globally.
11. Continental shelves and the open ocean typically absorb CO_{2} from the atmosphere.
12. The marine biological pump sequesters a small but significant fraction of the absorbed CO_{2} as organic carbon in marine sediments (see below).

=== Terrestrial runoff to the ocean ===
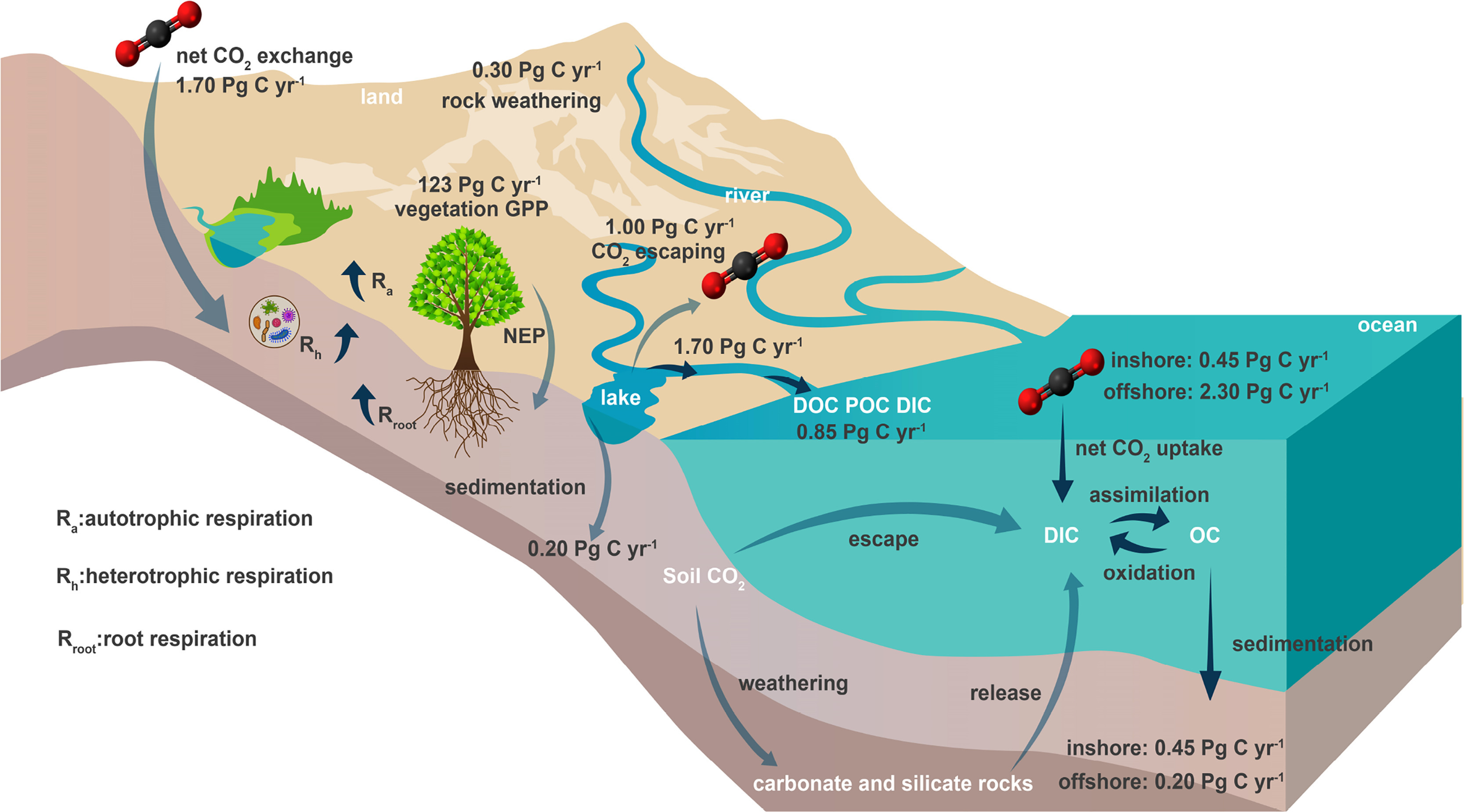
How carbon moves from inland waters to the ocean Carbon dioxide exchange, photosynthetic production and respiration of terrestrial vegetation, rock weathering, and sedimentation occur in terrestrial ecosystems. Carbon transports to the ocean through the land-river-estuary continuum in the form of organic carbon and inorganic carbon. Carbon exchange at the air-water interface, transportation, transformation and sedimentation occur in oceanic ecosystems.

Terrestrial and marine ecosystems are chiefly connected through riverine transport, which acts as the main channel through which erosive terrestrially derived substances enter into oceanic systems. Material and energy exchanges between the terrestrial biosphere and the lithosphere as well as organic carbon fixation and oxidation processes together regulate ecosystem carbon and dioxygen (O_{2}) pools.

Riverine transport, being the main connective channel of these pools, will act to transport net primary productivity (primarily in the form of dissolved organic carbon (DOC) and particulate organic carbon (POC)) from terrestrial to oceanic systems. During transport, part of DOC will rapidly return to the atmosphere through redox reactions, causing "carbon degassing" to occur between land-atmosphere storage layers. The remaining DOC and dissolved inorganic carbon (DIC) are also exported to the ocean. In 2015, inorganic and organic carbon export fluxes from global rivers were assessed as 0.50–0.70 Pg C y^{−1} and 0.15–0.35 Pg C y^{−1} respectively. On the other hand, POC can remain buried in sediment over an extensive period, and the annual global terrestrial to oceanic POC flux has been estimated at 0.20 (+0.13,-0.07) Gg C y^{−1}.

=== Biological pump in the ocean ===
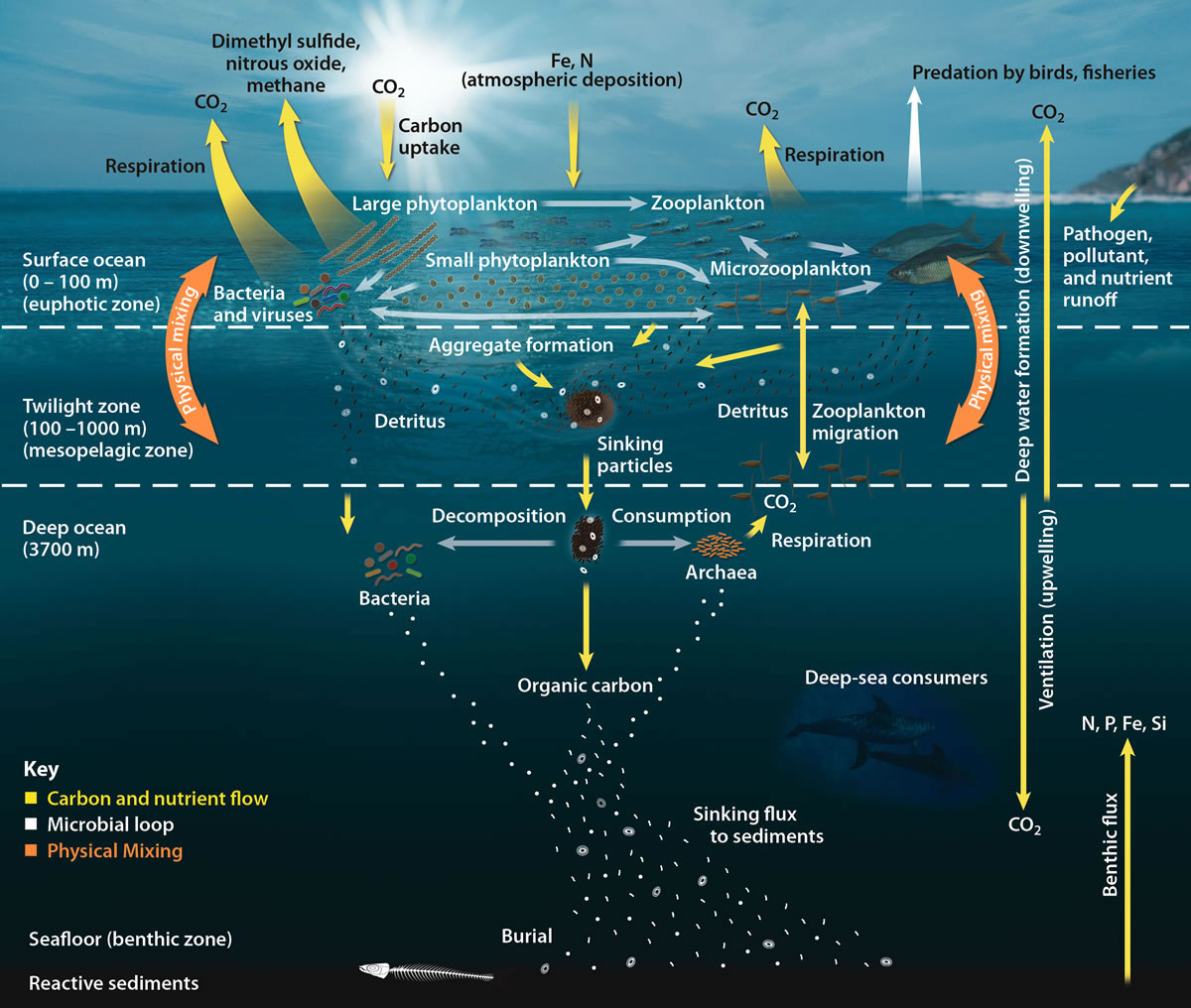
Flow of carbon through the open ocean

The ocean biological pump is the ocean's biologically driven sequestration of carbon from the atmosphere and land runoff to the deep ocean interior and seafloor sediments. The biological pump is not so much the result of a single process, but rather the sum of a number of processes each of which can influence biological pumping. The pump transfers about 11 billion tonnes of carbon every year into the ocean's interior. An ocean without the biological pump would result in atmospheric CO_{2} levels about 400 ppm higher than the present day.

Most carbon incorporated in organic and inorganic biological matter is formed at the sea surface where it can then start sinking to the ocean floor. The deep ocean gets most of its nutrients from the higher water column when they sink down in the form of marine snow. This is made up of dead or dying animals and microbes, fecal matter, sand and other inorganic material.

The biological pump is responsible for transforming dissolved inorganic carbon (DIC) into organic biomass and pumping it in particulate or dissolved form into the deep ocean. Inorganic nutrients and carbon dioxide are fixed during photosynthesis by phytoplankton, which both release dissolved organic matter (DOM) and are consumed by herbivorous zooplankton. Larger zooplankton - such as copepods, egest fecal pellets - which can be reingested, and sink or collect with other organic detritus into larger, more-rapidly-sinking aggregates. DOM is partially consumed by bacteria and respired; the remaining refractory DOM is advected and mixed into the deep sea. DOM and aggregates exported into the deep water are consumed and respired, thus returning organic carbon into the enormous deep ocean reservoir of DIC.

A single phytoplankton cell has a sinking rate around one metre per day. Given that the average depth of the ocean is about four kilometres, it can take over ten years for these cells to reach the ocean floor. However, through processes such as coagulation and expulsion in predator fecal pellets, these cells form aggregates. These aggregates have sinking rates orders of magnitude greater than individual cells and complete their journey to the deep in a matter of days.

About 1% of the particles leaving the surface ocean reach the seabed and are consumed, respired, or buried in the sediments. The net effect of these processes is to remove carbon in organic form from the surface and return it to DIC at greater depths, maintaining a surface-to-deep ocean gradient of DIC. Thermohaline circulation returns deep-ocean DIC to the atmosphere on millennial timescales. The carbon buried in the sediments can be subducted into the Earth's mantle and stored for millions of years as part of the slow carbon cycle (see next section).

=== Viruses as regulators ===
Viruses act as "regulators" of the fast carbon cycle because they impact the material cycles and energy flows of food webs and the microbial loop. The average contribution of viruses to the Earth ecosystem carbon cycle is 8.6%, of which its contribution to marine ecosystems (1.4%) is less than its contribution to terrestrial (6.7%) and freshwater (17.8%) ecosystems. Over the past 2,000 years, anthropogenic activities and climate change have gradually altered the regulatory role of viruses in ecosystem carbon cycling processes. This has been particularly conspicuous over the past 200 years due to rapid industrialization and the attendant population growth.

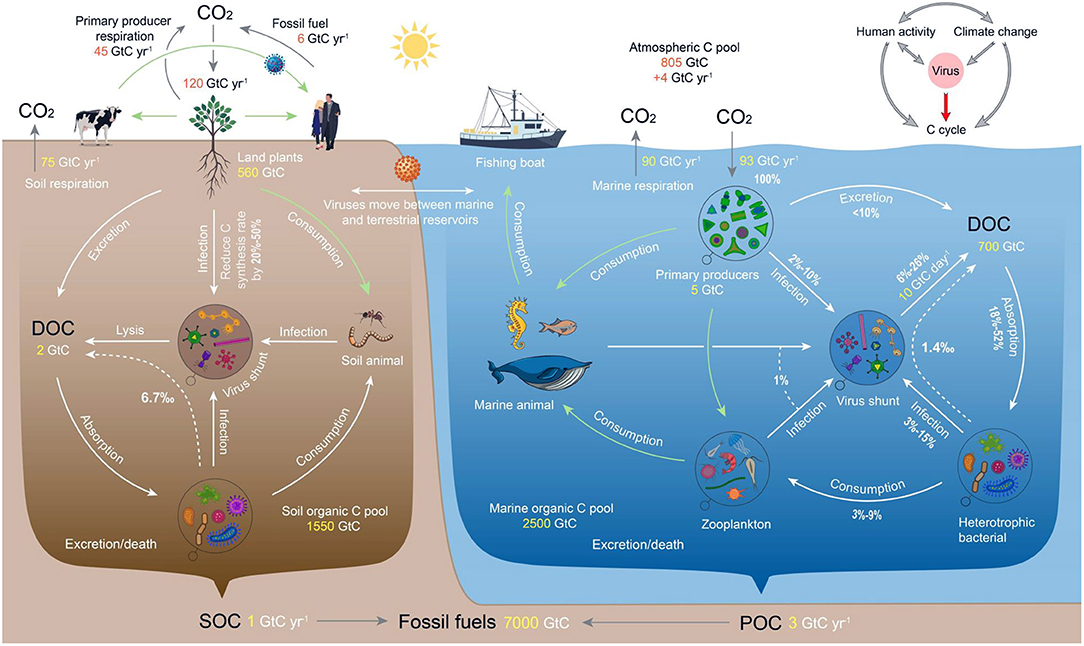
Comparison of how virus regulate the carbon cycle in terrestrial ecosystems (left) and in marine ecosystems (right). Arrows show the roles viruses play in the traditional food web, the microbial loop and the carbon cycle. Light green arrows represent the traditional food web, white arrows represent the microbial loop, and white dotted arrows represent the contribution rate of carbon produced by viral lysing of bacteria to the ecosystem dissolved organic carbon (DOC) pool. Freshwater ecosystems are regulated in a manner similar to marine ecosystems, and are not shown separately. The microbial loop is an important supplement to the classic food chain, wherein dissolved organic matter is ingested by heterotrophic "planktonic" bacteria during secondary production. These bacteria are then consumed by protozoa, copepods and other organisms, and eventually returned to the classical food chain.

== Processes within slow carbon cycle ==
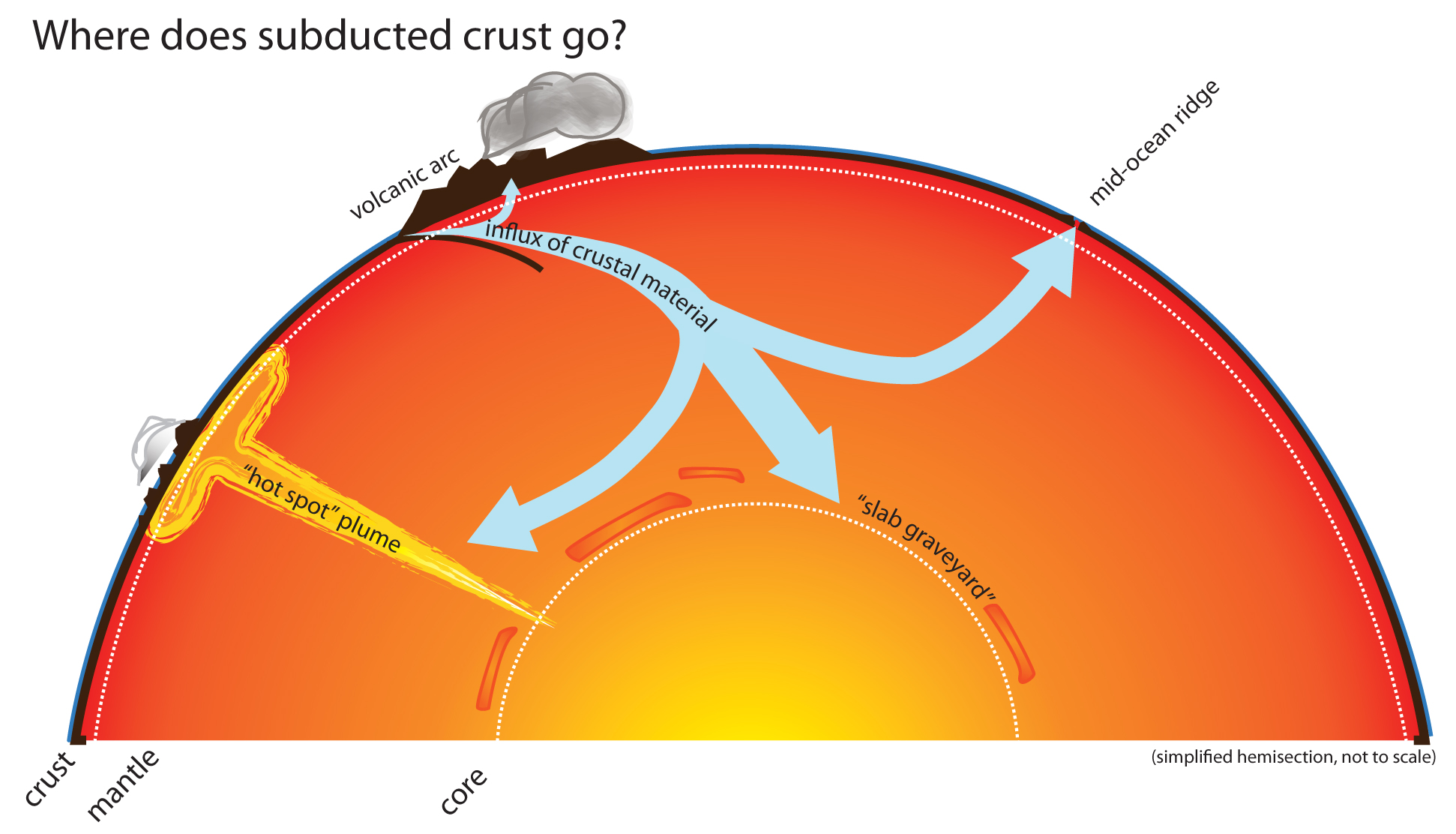
Movement of oceanic plates—which carry carbon compounds—through the mantle

Slow or deep carbon cycling is an important process, though it is not as well-understood as the relatively fast carbon movement through the atmosphere, terrestrial biosphere, ocean, and geosphere. The deep carbon cycle is intimately connected to the movement of carbon in the Earth's surface and atmosphere. If the process did not exist, carbon would remain in the atmosphere, where it would accumulate to extremely high levels over long periods of time. Therefore, by allowing carbon to return to the Earth, the deep carbon cycle plays a critical role in maintaining the terrestrial conditions necessary for life to exist.

Furthermore, the process is also significant simply due to the massive quantities of carbon it transports through the planet. In fact, studying the composition of basaltic magma and measuring carbon dioxide flux out of volcanoes reveals that the amount of carbon in the mantle is actually greater than that on the Earth's surface by a factor of one thousand. Drilling down and physically observing deep-Earth carbon processes is evidently extremely difficult, as the lower mantle and core extend from 660 to 2,891 km and 2,891 to 6,371 km deep into the Earth respectively. Accordingly, not much is conclusively known regarding the role of carbon in the deep Earth. Nonetheless, several pieces of evidence—many of which come from laboratory simulations of deep Earth conditions—have indicated mechanisms for the element's movement down into the lower mantle, as well as the forms that carbon takes at the extreme temperatures and pressures of said layer. Furthermore, techniques like seismology have led to a greater understanding of the potential presence of carbon in the Earth's core.

=== Carbon in the lower mantle ===
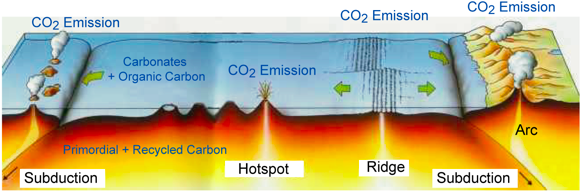
Carbon outgassing through various processes

Carbon principally enters the mantle in the form of carbonate-rich sediments on tectonic plates of ocean crust, which pull the carbon into the mantle upon undergoing subduction. Not much is known about carbon circulation in the mantle, especially in the deep Earth, but many studies have attempted to augment our understanding of the element's movement and forms within the region. For instance, a 2011 study demonstrated that carbon cycling extends all the way to the lower mantle. The study analyzed rare, super-deep diamonds at a site in Juina, Brazil, determining that the bulk composition of some of the diamonds' inclusions matched the expected result of basalt melting and crystallisation under lower mantle temperatures and pressures. Thus, the investigation's findings indicate that pieces of basaltic oceanic lithosphere act as the principle transport mechanism for carbon to Earth's deep interior. These subducted carbonates can interact with lower mantle silicates, eventually forming super-deep diamonds like the one found.

However, carbonates descending to the lower mantle encounter other fates in addition to forming diamonds. In 2011, carbonates were subjected to an environment similar to that of 1800 km deep into the Earth, well within the lower mantle. Doing so resulted in the formations of magnesite, siderite, and numerous varieties of graphite. Other experiments—as well as petrologic observations—support this claim, indicating that magnesite is actually the most stable carbonate phase in most part of the mantle. This is largely a result of its higher melting temperature. Consequently, scientists have concluded that carbonates undergo reduction as they descend into the mantle before being stabilised at depth by low oxygen fugacity environments. Magnesium, iron, and other metallic compounds act as buffers throughout the process. The presence of reduced, elemental forms of carbon like graphite would indicate that carbon compounds are reduced as they descend into the mantle.

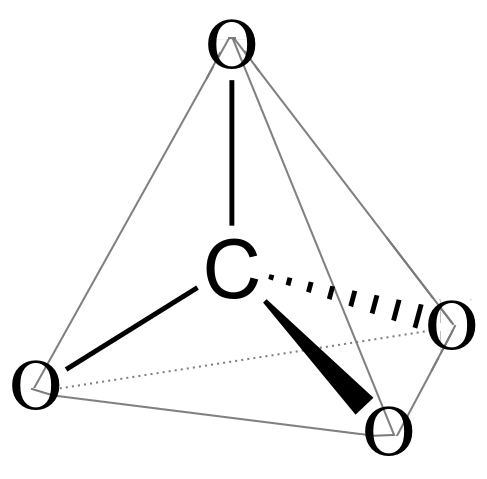
Carbon is tetrahedrally bonded to oxygen.

Polymorphism alters carbonate compounds' stability at different depths within the Earth. To illustrate, laboratory simulations and density functional theory calculations suggest that tetrahedrally coordinated carbonates are most stable at depths approaching the core–mantle boundary. A 2015 study indicates that the lower mantle's high pressure causes carbon bonds to transition from sp_{2} to sp_{3} hybridised orbitals, resulting in carbon tetrahedrally bonding to oxygen. CO_{3} trigonal groups cannot form polymerisable networks, while tetrahedral CO_{4} can, signifying an increase in carbon's coordination number, and therefore drastic changes in carbonate compounds' properties in the lower mantle. As an example, preliminary theoretical studies suggest that high pressure causes carbonate melt viscosity to increase; the melts' lower mobility as a result of its increased viscosity causes large deposits of carbon deep into the mantle.

Accordingly, carbon can remain in the lower mantle for long periods of time, but large concentrations of carbon frequently find their way back to the lithosphere. This process, called carbon outgassing, is the result of carbonated mantle undergoing decompression melting, as well as mantle plumes carrying carbon compounds up towards the crust. Carbon is oxidised upon its ascent towards volcanic hotspots, where it is then released as CO_{2}. This occurs so that the carbon atom matches the oxidation state of the basalts erupting in such areas.

Knowledge about carbon in the core can be gained by analysing shear wave velocities.

=== Carbon in the core ===
Although the presence of carbon in the Earth's core is well-constrained, recent studies suggest large inventories of carbon could be stored in this region. Shear (S) waves moving through the inner core travel at about fifty percent of the velocity expected for most iron-rich alloys. Because the core's composition is believed to be an alloy of crystalline iron and a small amount of nickel, this seismic anomaly indicates the presence of light elements, including carbon, in the core. In fact, studies using diamond anvil cells to replicate the conditions in the Earth's core indicate that iron carbide (Fe_{7}C_{3}) matches the inner core's wave speed and density. Therefore, the iron carbide model could serve as an evidence that the core holds as much as 67% of the Earth's carbon. Furthermore, another study found that in the pressure and temperature condition of the Earth's inner core, carbon dissolved in iron and formed a stable phase with the same Fe_{7}C_{3} composition—albeit with a different structure from the one previously mentioned. In summary, although the amount of carbon potentially stored in the Earth's core is not known, recent studies indicate that the presence of iron carbides can explain some of the geophysical observations.

== Human influence on fast carbon cycle ==
Carbon dioxide emissions and partitioning

Emissions of CO_{2} have been caused by different sources ramping up one after the other (Global Carbon Project).

Partitioning of CO_{2} emissions show that most emissions are being absorbed by carbon sinks, including plant growth, soil uptake, and ocean uptake (Global Carbon Project).

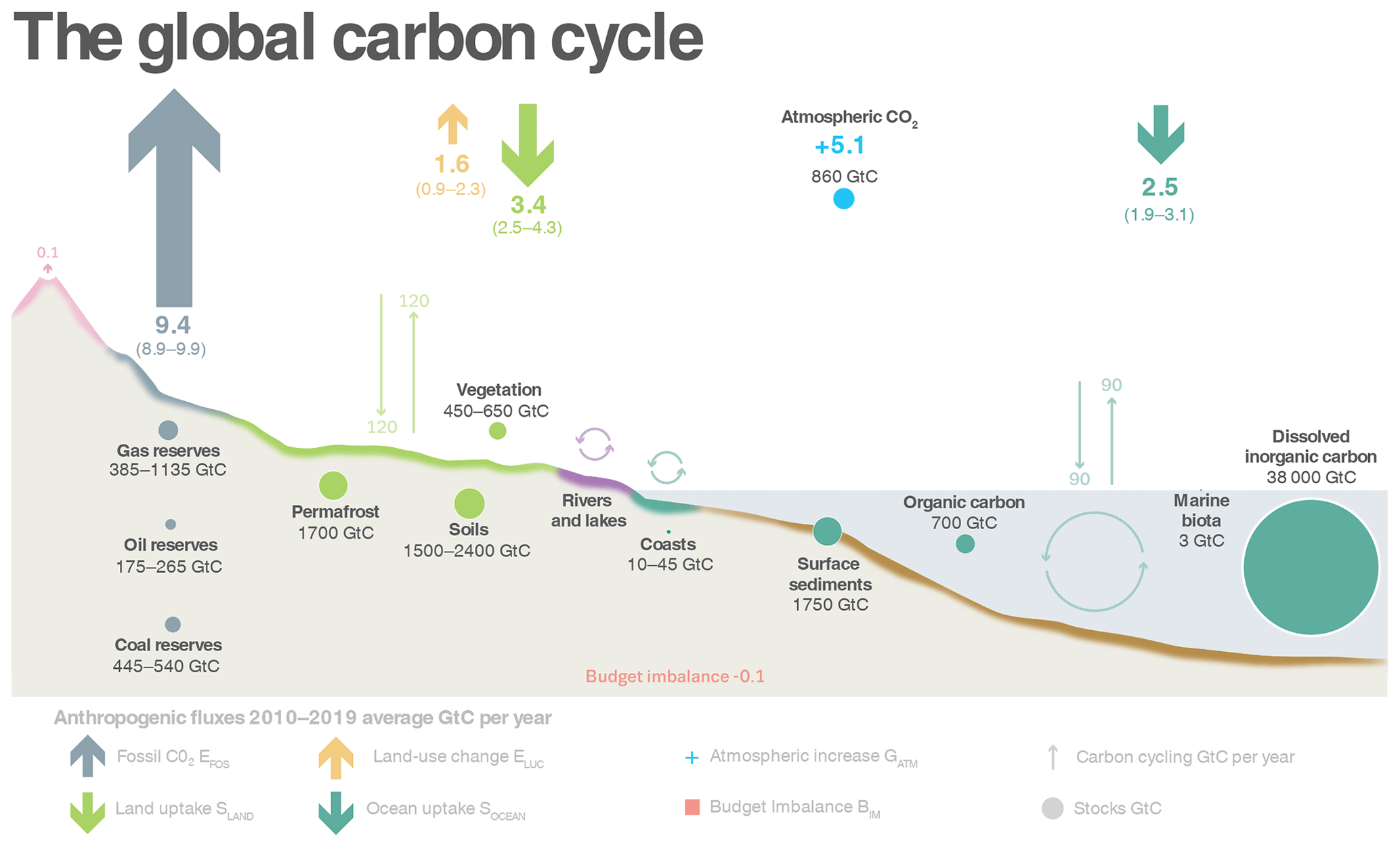
Schematic representation of the overall perturbation of the global carbon cycle caused by anthropogenic activities, averaged from 2010 to 2019

Since the Industrial Revolution, and especially since the end of WWII, human activity has substantially disturbed the global carbon cycle by redistributing massive amounts of carbon from the geosphere. Humans have also continued to shift the natural component functions of the terrestrial biosphere with changes to vegetation and other land use. Man-made (synthetic) carbon compounds have been designed and mass-manufactured that will persist for decades to millennia in air, water, and sediments as pollutants. Climate change is amplifying and forcing further indirect human changes to the carbon cycle as a consequence of various positive and negative feedbacks.

=== Climate change ===
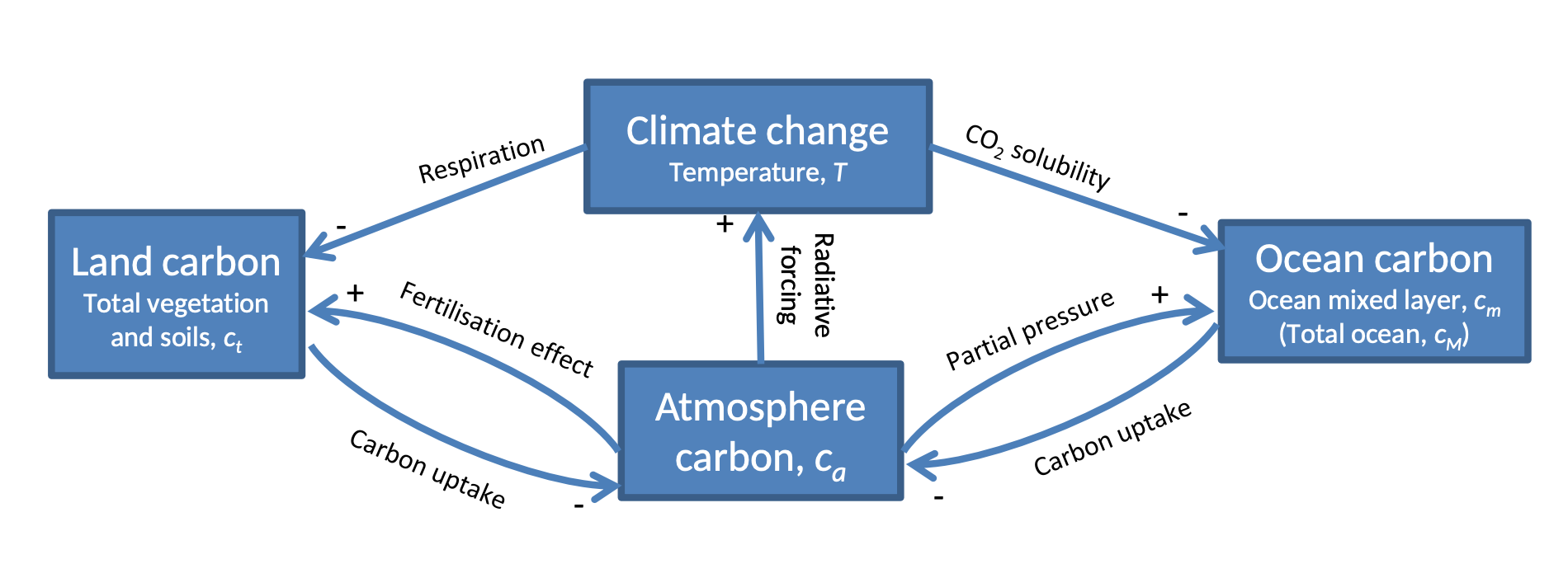
Climate–carbon cycle feedbacks and state variables as represented in a stylised model Carbon stored on land in vegetation and soils is aggregated into a single stock c_{t}. Ocean mixed layer carbon, c_{m}, is the only explicitly modelled ocean stock of carbon; though to estimate carbon cycle feedbacks the total ocean carbon is also calculated.

Current trends in climate change lead to higher ocean temperatures and acidity, thus modifying marine ecosystems. Also, acid rain and polluted runoff from agriculture and industry change the ocean's chemical composition. Such changes can have dramatic effects on highly sensitive ecosystems such as coral reefs, thus limiting the ocean's ability to absorb carbon from the atmosphere on a regional scale and reducing oceanic biodiversity globally.

The exchanges of carbon between the atmosphere and other components of the Earth system, collectively known as the carbon cycle, currently constitute important negative (dampening) feedbacks on the effect of anthropogenic carbon emissions on climate change. Carbon sinks in the land and the ocean each currently take up about one-quarter of anthropogenic carbon emissions each year.

These feedbacks are expected to weaken in the future, amplifying the effect of anthropogenic carbon emissions on climate change. The degree to which they will weaken, however, is highly uncertain, with Earth system models predicting a wide range of land and ocean carbon uptakes even under identical atmospheric concentration or emission scenarios. Arctic methane emissions indirectly caused by anthropogenic global warming also affect the carbon cycle and contribute to further warming.

==== Fossil carbon extraction and burning ====
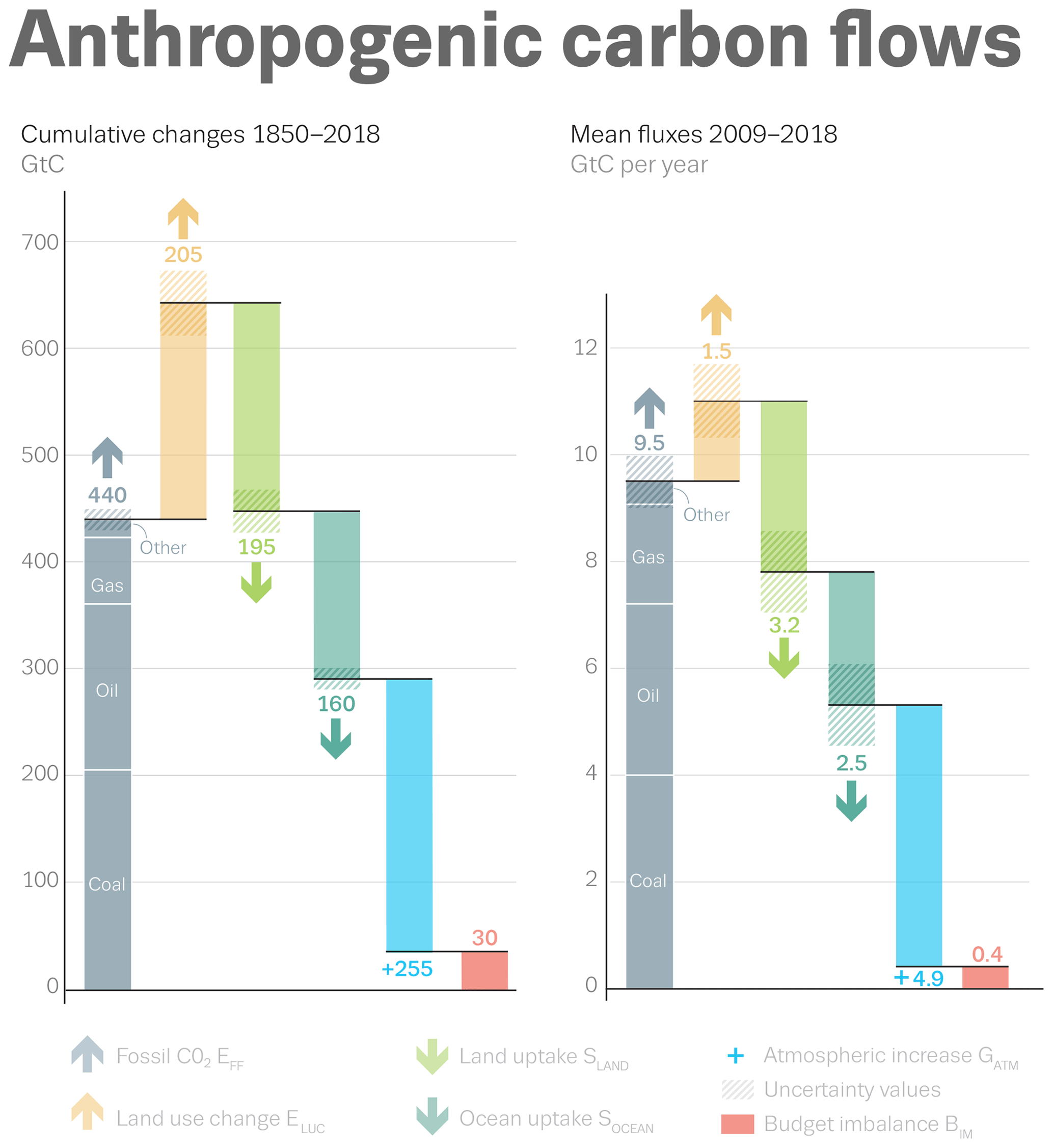
Detail of anthropogenic carbon flows, showing cumulative mass in gigatons during years 1850–2018 (left) and the annual mass average during 2009–2018 (right)

The largest and one of the fastest growing human impacts on the carbon cycle and biosphere is the extraction and burning of fossil fuels, which directly transfer carbon from the geosphere into the atmosphere. Carbon dioxide is also produced and released during the calcination of limestone for clinker production. Clinker is an industrial precursor of cement.

As of 2020, about 450 gigatons of fossil carbon have been extracted in total; an amount approaching the carbon contained in all of Earth's living terrestrial biomass. Recent rates of global emissions directly into the atmosphere have exceeded the uptake by vegetation and the oceans. These sinks have been expected and observed to remove about half of the added atmospheric carbon within about a century. Nevertheless, sinks like the ocean have evolving saturation properties, and a substantial fraction (20–35%, based on coupled models) of the added carbon is projected to remain in the atmosphere for centuries to millennia.

==== Halocarbons ====
Halocarbons are less prolific compounds developed for diverse uses throughout industry; for example as solvents and refrigerants. Nevertheless, the buildup of relatively small concentrations (parts per trillion) of chlorofluorocarbon, hydrofluorocarbon, and perfluorocarbon gases in the atmosphere is responsible for about 10% of the total direct radiative forcing from all long-lived greenhouse gases (year 2019); which includes forcing from the much larger concentrations of carbon dioxide and methane. Chlorofluorocarbons also cause stratospheric ozone depletion. International efforts are ongoing under the Montreal Protocol and Kyoto Protocol to control rapid growth in the industrial manufacturing and use of these environmentally potent gases. For some applications more benign alternatives such as hydrofluoroolefins have been developed and are being gradually introduced.

=== Land use changes ===
Since the invention of agriculture, humans have directly and gradually influenced the carbon cycle over century-long timescales by modifying the mixture of vegetation in the terrestrial biosphere. Over the past several centuries, direct and indirect human-caused land use and land cover change (LUCC) has led to the loss of biodiversity, which lowers ecosystems' resilience to environmental stresses and decreases their ability to remove carbon from the atmosphere. More directly, it often leads to the release of carbon from terrestrial ecosystems into the atmosphere.

Deforestation for agricultural purposes removes forests, which hold large amounts of carbon, and replaces them, generally with agricultural or urban areas. Both of these replacement land cover types store comparatively small amounts of carbon so that the net result of the transition is that more carbon stays in the atmosphere. However, the effects on the atmosphere and overall carbon cycle can be intentionally and/or naturally reversed with reforestation.

== See also ==
- Biogeochemical cycle – Chemical transfer pathway between Earth's biological and non-biological parts
- Climate change mitigation – Actions to reduce net greenhouse gas emissions to limit climate change
- Carbon dioxide in Earth's atmosphere – Atmospheric constituent and greenhouse gas
- Carbon sequestration – Storing carbon in a carbon pool
- Carbonate–silicate cycle – Geochemical transformation of silicate rocks
- Ocean acidification – Decrease of pH levels in the ocean
- Orbiting Carbon Observatory – Failed NASA climate satellite
- Permafrost carbon cycle – Sub-cycle of the larger global carbon cycle
