= List of cycles =

This is a list of recurring cycles. See also Index of wave articles, Time, and Pattern.

== Planetary cycles ==
=== Astronomical cycles ===
Astronomy – Axial precession – CNO cycle – Eclipse cycle – Eclipse – Full moon cycle – Galactic year – Great Year – Lunar phase – Mesoamerican calendars – Metonic cycle – Milankovitch cycles – Mira – Moon – Nutation – Orbit – Orbital period – Saros cycle – Sothic cycle – Secularity – Sidereal year – Sunspot – Tide – Tropical year – Year

=== Climate and weather cycles ===
Animal migration – Avalanche – Carbon cycle – Climate change – Climate change and agriculture – Climate model – Climate oscillation – Clock of the Long Now – Ecology – El Niño/La Niña – Environmental geography – Global cooling – Global warming – Historical temperature record – Hydrogen cycle – Ice age – Transhumance – Milankovitch cycles – Monsoon – Pleistocene – Season – Sulfur cycle – Sunspot – Tide – Timeline of meteorology – 1500-year climate cycle

=== Geological cycles ===
Age of the Earth – Aluminum cycle – Arsenic cycle – Boron cycle – Bromine cycle – Cadmium cycle – Calcium cycle – Carbonate–silicate cycle – Chlorine cycle – Chromium cycle – Climate change – Copper cycle – Cycle of erosion – Dynamic topography – Dynamic topography – Earthquake cycle – Fluorine cycle – Glaciation – Gold cycle – Iodine cycle – Iron cycle – Lead cycle – Lithium cycle – Manganese cycle – Mass extinction cycles – Mercury cycle – Methane cycle – Ozone–oxygen cycle – Phosphorus cycle – Selenium cycle – Silica cycle – Supercontinent cycle – Vanadium cycle – Wilson cycle – Zinc cycle

== Organic cycles ==
=== Agricultural cycles ===
Agricultural cycle – Carbon cycle – Crop rotation – Fertile Crescent – Harvest – Nitrogen cycle – Organic farming – Phosphorus cycle – Season – Sulfur cycle – Soil degradation – Sustainable industries – Water cycle

=== Biological and medical cycles ===
Alternation of generations – Beta oxidation – Bioelectricity – Biological pest control – Biological rhythm – Bipolar disorder – Cardiopulmonary resuscitation – Calvin–Benson cycle – Cell cycle – Chronobiology – Citric acid cycle – Circadian rhythm – Clinical depression – Digestion – Ecology – Endometrium – Feedback – Infradian rhythm - Life cycle – List of biochemistry topics – Marine biology – Menstrual cycle – Neurofeedback – Non-Hodgkin lymphoma – Organic farming – Periodical cicadas – Polymerase chain reaction – Soil degradation – Stomach cancer – Triage – Ultradian rhythm - Urea cycle – Zygote

=== Brain waves and cycles ===
Bioelectricity – Circadian rhythm – Consciousness – Electroencephalography – Neurofeedback – Persistent vegetative state – Sjögren's syndrome – Sleep - Ultradian rhythm

== Physics cycles ==
Cyclic process – Carnot cycle – Double-slit experiment – Dynamic theory of gravity – Physics of music – Resonance – Sonoluminescence – Speed of light – Sunspot

=== Mathematics of waves and cycles ===
Almost periodic function – Amplitude modulation – Amplitude – Beat – Chaos theory – Cyclic group – Diffraction – Doppler effect – Eigenstate – Eigenvalue – Fibonacci sequence – Fourier series – Frequency domain – Frequency spectrum – Hamiltonian (quantum mechanics) – Harmonic oscillator – Huygens–Fresnel principle – Longitudinal wave – Mechanical wave – Navier–Stokes equations – Partial differential equation – Periodic function – Permutation – Phase (waves) – Physics of music – Power spectrum – Signal – Sine wave – Spectrum of an operator – Translational symmetry – Transverse wave – Wave equation – Wave–particle duality – Wave – Waveform

=== Electromagnetic spectrum ===
Absorption spectroscopy – Anders Jonas Ångström – Astronomical spectroscopy – Astronomy – Black body – Blazar – Bremsstrahlung – Caesium – Cherenkov radiation – Color – Diffraction – Digital signal processing – Direct-sequence spread spectrum – Dispersion (optics) – Eigenstate – Eigenvalue – Electromagnetic radiation – Electromagnetic spectroscopy – Electromagnetic spectrum – Electromagnetism – Emission line – Emission spectrum – FM broadcasting – Frequency domain – Frequency hopping – Frequency spectrum – Gamma-ray burst – Hamiltonian (quantum mechanics) – History of radio – Hue – Isotope – Light – Optical brightener – Orbits (complex dynamics) –Particle in a spherically symmetric potential – Piezoelectricity – Power spectrum – RADAR – Radio frequency – Radio – Radiocommunications Agency – Redshift – SETI – Spectrogram – Spectrometer – Spectroscopy – Spectrum analyzer – Sunyaev–Zel'dovich effect – Supernova – Telecommunication – Timbre – Very high frequency – Visible light – Visible spectrum – White noise

=== Sound waves ===
Acoustic theory – Acoustics – Aerodynamics – Amplitude – Anemometer – Audio feedback – Beat (acoustics) – Bugging – Cherenkov radiation – Cold fusion – Compressibility – Delay-line memory – Diffraction – Doppler effect – Echo sounding – Electronic filter – FTIR – Krakatoa – Loudspeaker – Mach number – Microphone – Ossicles – Pan pipes – Parabolic microphone – Phonetics – Phonon – Piezoelectricity – Psychoacoustics – Sawtooth wave – Shock wave – SID – Sonar – Sonic boom – Sonoluminescence – Soundproofing – Sound recording – Sound – Speech processing – Speed of sound – Square wave – Subsonic – Subtractive synthesis – Synthesizer – Telephone – Transmission line – Triangle wave – Wave drag – Waveform

== Cycles researchers ==
Edward R. Dewey – David Brunt – William Playfair – Sir William Beveridge – Raymond Holder Wheeler – A. E. Douglass – Eduard Brückner – Charles Elton – Nikolai Kondratiev – Alexander Chizhevsky – Harlan True Stetson – Henry Helm Clayton – Halbert Powers Gillette – Ellsworth Huntington – Clément Juglar – Samuel Benner - Raymond Holder Wheeler

=== Economic and business cycles ===
Business cycle – Inflation / Recession – Monetary policy – Virtuous circle and vicious circle – Kitchin cycle – Juglar cycle – Kuznets swing

=== Music and rhythm cycles ===
Harmonics – Interval cycle – Musica universalis – Music theory – Physics of music – Ring cycle – Rhythm – Song cycle

=== Political cycles ===
Election Cycle – Campaign Cycle – Cycle between political extremes – American political cycle

=== Religious, mythological, and spiritual cycles ===
Astrology – Mantra – Numerology – Pratītyasamutpāda – Samhain – Sexagenary cycle – Surya

=== Social and cultural cycles ===
Dynastic cycle – Kondratiev wave – Social cycle theory – Tytler cycle – Strauss–Howe generational theory

=== Military and war ===
War cycles - Joshua S. Goldstein - George Modelski

=== Literature ===
Literature cycle – Play cycle – Sonnet cycle
