= Soil chemistry =

Study of chemical characteristics of soil

Soil chemistry is the study of the chemical characteristics of soil. Soil chemistry is affected by mineral composition, organic matter and environmental factors. In the early 1870s a consulting chemist to the Royal Agricultural Society in England, named J. Thomas Way, performed many experiments on how soils exchange ions, and is considered the father of soil chemistry. Other scientists who contributed to this branch of ecology include Edmund Ruffin, and Linus Pauling.

== History ==
Until the late 1960s, soil chemistry focused primarily on chemical reactions in the soil that contribute to pedogenesis or that affect plant growth. Since then, concerns have grown about environmental pollution, organic and inorganic soil contamination and potential ecological health and environmental health risks. Consequently, the emphasis in soil chemistry has shifted from pedology and agricultural soil science to an emphasis on environmental soil science.

== Environmental soil chemistry ==
A knowledge of environmental soil chemistry is paramount to predicting the fate of contaminants, as well as the processes by which they are initially released into the soil. Once a chemical is exposed to the soil environment, myriad chemical reactions can occur that may increase or decrease contaminant toxicity. These reactions include adsorption/desorption, precipitation, polymerization, dissolution, hydrolysis, hydration, complexation and oxidation/reduction. These reactions are often disregarded by scientists and engineers involved with environmental remediation. Understanding these processes enable us to better predict the fate and toxicity of contaminants and provide the knowledge to develop scientifically correct, and cost-effective remediation strategies.

== Key concepts ==
=== Soil structure ===
Soil structure refers to the manner in which these individual soil particles are grouped together to form clusters of particles called aggregates. This is determined by the types of soil formation, parent material, and texture. Soil structure can be influenced by a wide variety of biota as well as management methods by humans.

==== Formation of aggregates ====
- Aggregates form under varying soil forming conditions and differ in structure as a result
- Natural aggregation results in soil peds.
- Compaction produces hard dirt clods rather than soft soil peds. Clods result from tillage, excavation, and using heavy field equipment under poor (wet) soil conditions.
- Microbial activity also influences the formation of aggregates.

==== Types of soil structure ====
The classification of soil structural forms is based largely on shape.

Soil particle shapes
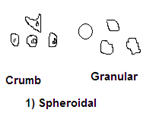
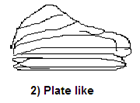
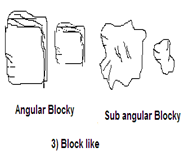
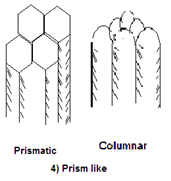
1. Spheroidal structure: sphere-like or rounded in shape. All the axes are approximately of the same dimensions, with curved and irregular faces. These are found commonly in cultivated fields.
  1. Crumb structure: small and are like crumbs of bread due to them being porous
  2. Granular structure: less porous than crumb structure aggregates and are more durable than crumb structure aggregates
2. Plate-like structure: mainly horizontally aligned along plant based areas, with thin units being laminar and the thick units of the aggregates are classified as platy. Platy structures are usually found in the surface and sometimes in the lower sub-soils.
3. Block-like structure: particles that are arranged around a central point are enclosed by surfaces that may be either flat or somewhat rounded. These types are generally found in subsoil.
  1. Sub angular blocky: corners are more rounded than the angular blocky aggregates
4. Prism-like structure: particles that are longer than they are wide, with the vertical axis being greater than the horizontal axis. They are commonly found in subsoil horizon of arid and semi-arid region soils.
  1. Prismatic: more angular and hexagonal at the top of the aggregate
  2. Columnar: particles that are rounded at the top of the aggregate

==== Minerals ====
- The mineral components of the soil are derived from the parental rocks or regolith. The minerals present about 90% of the total weight of the soil. Some important elements, which are found in compound state, are oxygen, iron, silicon, aluminium, nitrogen, phosphorus, potassium, calcium, magnesium, carbon, hydrogen, etc.
- The formation of primary and secondary minerals can better define what minerals are in the rock composition

==== Soil pores ====
The interactions of the soil's micropores and macropores are important to soil chemistry, as they allow for the provision of water and gaseous elements to the soil and the surrounding atmosphere. Macropores help transport molecules and substances in and out of the micropores. Micropores are comprised within the aggregates themselves.

==== Soil water ====
- Water is essential for organisms within the soil profile, and it partially fills up the macropores in an ideal soil.
- Leaching of the soil occurs as water carries along with it ions deeper into the lower soil horizons, causing the soil to become more oxidized in other soil horizons.
- Water also will go from a higher water potential to a lower water potential, this can result in capillarity activity and gravitational force occurring with the water due to adhesion of the water to the soil surface and cohesion amongst the water molecules.

==== Air/Atmosphere ====
The atmosphere contains three main gases, namely oxygen, carbon dioxide (CO_{2}) and nitrogen. In the atmosphere, oxygen is 20%, nitrogen is 79% and CO_{2} is 0.15% to 0.65% by volume. CO_{2} increases with the increase in the depth of soil because of decomposition of accumulated organic matter and abundance of plant roots. The presence of oxygen in the soil is important because it helps in breaking down insoluble rocky mass into soluble minerals and organic humification. Air in the soil is composed of gases that are present in the atmosphere, but not in the same proportions. These gases facilitate chemical reactions in microorganisms. Accumulation of soluble nutrients in the soil makes it more productive. If the soil is deficient in oxygen, microbial activity is slowed down or eliminated. Important factors controlling the soil atmosphere are temperature, atmospheric pressure, wind/aeration and rainfall.

=== Soil texture ===
Soil texture triangle

Soil texture influences the soil chemistry pertaining to the soil's ability to maintain its structure, the restriction of water flow and the contents of the particles in the soil. Soil texture considers all particle types and a soil texture triangle is a chart that can be used to calculate the percentages of each particle type adding up to total 100% for the soil profile. These soil separates differ not only in their sizes but also in their bearing on some of the important factors affecting plant growth such as soil aeration, work ability, movement and availability of water and nutrients.

==== Sand ====
Sand particles range in size (about 0.05–2 mm). Sand is the most coarse of the particle groups. Sand has the largest pores and soil particles of the particle groups. It also drains the most easily. These particles become more involved in chemical reactions when coated with clay.

==== Silt ====
Silt particles range in size (about 0.002–0.05 mm). Silt pores are considered a medium in size compared with the other particle groups. Silt has a texture consistency of flour. Silt particles allow water and air to pass readily, yet retain moisture for crop growth. Silty soil contains sufficient quantities of nutrients, both organic and inorganic.

==== Clay ====
Clay has particles smallest in size (about <0.002 mm) of the particle groups. Clay also has the smallest pores which give it a greater porosity, and it does not drain well. Clay has a sticky texture when wet. Some kinds can grow and dissipate, or in other words shrink and swell.

==== Loam ====
Loam is a combination of sand, silt and clay that encompasses soils. It can be named based on the primary particles in the soil composition, ex. sandy loam, clay loam, silt loam, etc.

=== Biota ===
Biota are organisms that, along with organic matter, help comprise the biological system of the soil. The vast majority of biological activity takes place near the soil surface, usually in the A horizon of a soil profile. Biota rely on inputs of organic matter in order to sustain themselves and increase population sizes. In return, they contribute nutrients to the soil, typically after it has been cycled in the soil trophic food web.

With the many different interactions that take place, biota can largely impact their environment physically, chemically, and biologically (Pavao-Zuckerman, 2008). A prominent factor that helps to provide some degree of stability with these interactions is biodiversity, a key component of all ecological communities. Biodiversity allows for a consistent flow of energy through trophic levels and strongly influences the structure of ecological communities in the soil.

==== Soil organisms ====
Types of living soil biota can be divided into categories of plants (flora), animals (fauna), and microorganisms. Plants play a role in soil chemistry by exchanging nutrients with microorganisms and absorbing nutrients, creating concentration gradients of cations and anions. In addition to this, the differences in water potential created by plants influence water movement in soil, which affects the form and transportation of various particles. Vegetative cover on the soil surface greatly reduces erosion, which in turn prevents compaction and helps to maintain aeration in the soil pore space, providing oxygen and carbon to the biota and cation exchange sites that depend on it. Animals are essential to soil chemistry, as they regulate the cycling of nutrients and energy into different forms. This is primarily done through food webs. Some types of soil animals can be found below.

- Detritivores
  - Examples include millipedes, woodlice, and dung beetles
- Decomposers
  - Examples include fungi, earthworms, and bacteria
- Protozoans
  - Examples include amoeba, euglena, and paramecium

Soil microbes play a major role in a multitude of biological and chemical activities that take place in soil. These microorganisms are said to make up around 1,000–10,000 kg of biomass per hectare in some soils (García-Sánchez, 2016). They are mostly recognized for their association with plants. The most well-known example of this is mycorrhizae, which exchange carbon for nitrogen with plant roots in a symbiotic relationship. Additionally, microbes are responsible for the majority of respiration that takes place in the soil, which has implications for the release of gases like methane and nitrous oxide from soil (giving it significance in discussion of climate change) (Frouz et al., 2020). Given the significance of the effects of microbes on their environment, the conservation and promotion of microbial life is often desired by many plant growers, conservationists, and ecologists.

==== Soil organic matter ====
Soil organic matter is the largest source of nutrients and energy in a soil. Its inputs strongly influence key soil factors such as types of biota, pH, and even soil order. Soil organic matter is often strategically applied by plant growers because of its ability to improve soil structure, supply nutrients, manage pH, increase water retention, and regulate soil temperature (which directly affects water dynamics and biota).

The chief elements found in humus, the product of organic matter decomposition in soil, are carbon, hydrogen, oxygen, sulphur and nitrogen. The important compound found in humus are carbohydrates, phosphoric acid, some organic acids, resins, urea etc. Humus is a dynamic product and is constantly changing because of its oxidation, reduction and hydrolysis; hence, it has much carbon content and less nitrogen. This material can come from a variety of sources, but often derives from livestock manure and plant residues.

Though there are many other variables, such as texture, soils that lack sufficient organic matter content are susceptible to soil degradation and drying, as there is nothing supporting the soil structure. This often leads to a decline in soil fertility and an increase in erodibility.

Other associated concepts:

- Anion and cation exchange capacity
- Soil pH
- Mineral formation and transformation processes and pedogenesis
- Clay mineralogy
- Sorption and precipitation reactions in soil
- Chemistry of problem soils
- C/N ratio
- Erosion and soil degradation

=== Soil cycle ===
Many plant nutrients in soil undergo biogeochemical cycles throughout their environment. These cycles are influenced by water, gas exchange, biological activity, immobilization, and mineralization dynamics, but each element has its own course of flow (Deemy et al., 2022). For example, nitrogen moves from an isolated gaseous form to the compounds nitrate and nitrite as it moves through soil and becomes available to plants. In comparison, an element like phosphorus transfers in mineral form, as it is contained in rock material. These cycles also greatly vary in mobility, solubility, and the rate at which they move through their natural cycles. Together, they drive all of the processes of soil chemistry.

==== Elemental cycles ====
- Carbon
- Hydrogen
- Oxygen
- Nitrogen
- Phosphorus
- Potassium
- Sulfur
- Calcium
- Magnesium
- Iron
- Boron
- Manganese
- Copper
- Zinc
- Nickel
- Chlorine

== Methods of investigation ==
New knowledge about the chemistry of soils often comes from studies in the laboratory, in which soil samples taken from undisturbed soil horizons in the field are used in experiments that include replicated treatments and controls. In many cases, the soil samples are air dried at ambient temperatures (e.g., 25 °C (77 °F)) and sieved to a 2 mm size prior to storage for further study. Such drying and sieving soil samples markedly disrupts soil structure, microbial population diversity, and chemical properties related to pH, oxidation-reduction status, manganese oxidation state, and dissolved organic matter; among other properties. Renewed interest in recent decades has led many soil chemists to maintain soil samples in a field-moist condition and stored at 4 °C (39 °F) under aerobic conditions before and during investigations.

Two approaches are frequently used in laboratory investigations in soil chemistry. The first is known as batch equilibration. The chemist adds a given volume of water or salt solution of known concentration of dissolved ions to a mass of soil (e.g., 25–mL of solution to 5–g of soil in a centrifuge tube or flask). The soil slurry then is shaken or swirled for a given amount of time (e.g., 15 minutes to many hours) to establish a steady state or equilibrium condition prior to filtering or centrifuging at high speed to separate sand grains, silt particles, and clay colloids from the equilibrated solution. The filtrate or centrifugate then is analyzed using one of several methods, including ion specific electrodes, atomic absorption spectrophotometry, inductively coupled plasma spectrometry, ion chromatography, and colorimetric methods. In each case, the analysis quantifies the concentration or activity of an ion or molecule in the solution phase, and by multiplying the measured concentration or activity (e.g., in mg ion/mL) by the solution-to-soil ratio (mL of extraction solution/g soil), the chemist obtains the result in mg ion/g soil. This result based on the mass of soil allows comparisons between different soils and treatments. A related approach uses a known volume to solution to leach (infiltrate) the extracting solution through a quantity of soil in small columns at a controlled rate to simulate how rain, snow meltwater, and irrigation water pass through soils in the field. The filtrate then is analyzed using the same methods as used in batch equilibrations.

Another approach to quantifying soil processes and phenomena uses in situ methods that do not disrupt the soil. as occurs when the soil is shaken or leached with an extracting soil solution. These methods usually use surface spectroscopic techniques, such as Fourier transform infrared spectroscopy, nuclear magnetic resonance, Mössbauer spectroscopy, and X-ray spectroscopy. These approaches aim to obtain information on the chemical nature of the mineralogy and chemistry of particle and colloid surfaces, and how ions and molecules are associated with such surfaces by adsorption, complexation, and precipitation.

These laboratory experiments and analyses have an advantage over field studies in that chemical mechanisms on how ions and molecules react in soils can be inferred from the data. One can draw conclusions or frame new hypotheses on similar reactions in different soils with diverse textures, organic matter contents, types of clay minerals and oxides, pH, and drainage condition. Laboratory studies have the disadvantage that they lose some of the realism and heterogeneity of undisturbed soil in the field, while gaining control and the power of extrapolation to unstudied soil. Mechanistic laboratory studies combined with more realistic, less controlled, observational field studies often yield accurate approximations of the behavior and chemistry of the soils that may be spatially heterogeneous and temporally variable. Another challenge faced by soil chemists is how microbial populations and enzyme activity in field soils may be changed when the soil is disturbed, both in the field and laboratory, particularly when soils samples are dried prior to laboratory studies and analysis.
