= Iodine cycle =

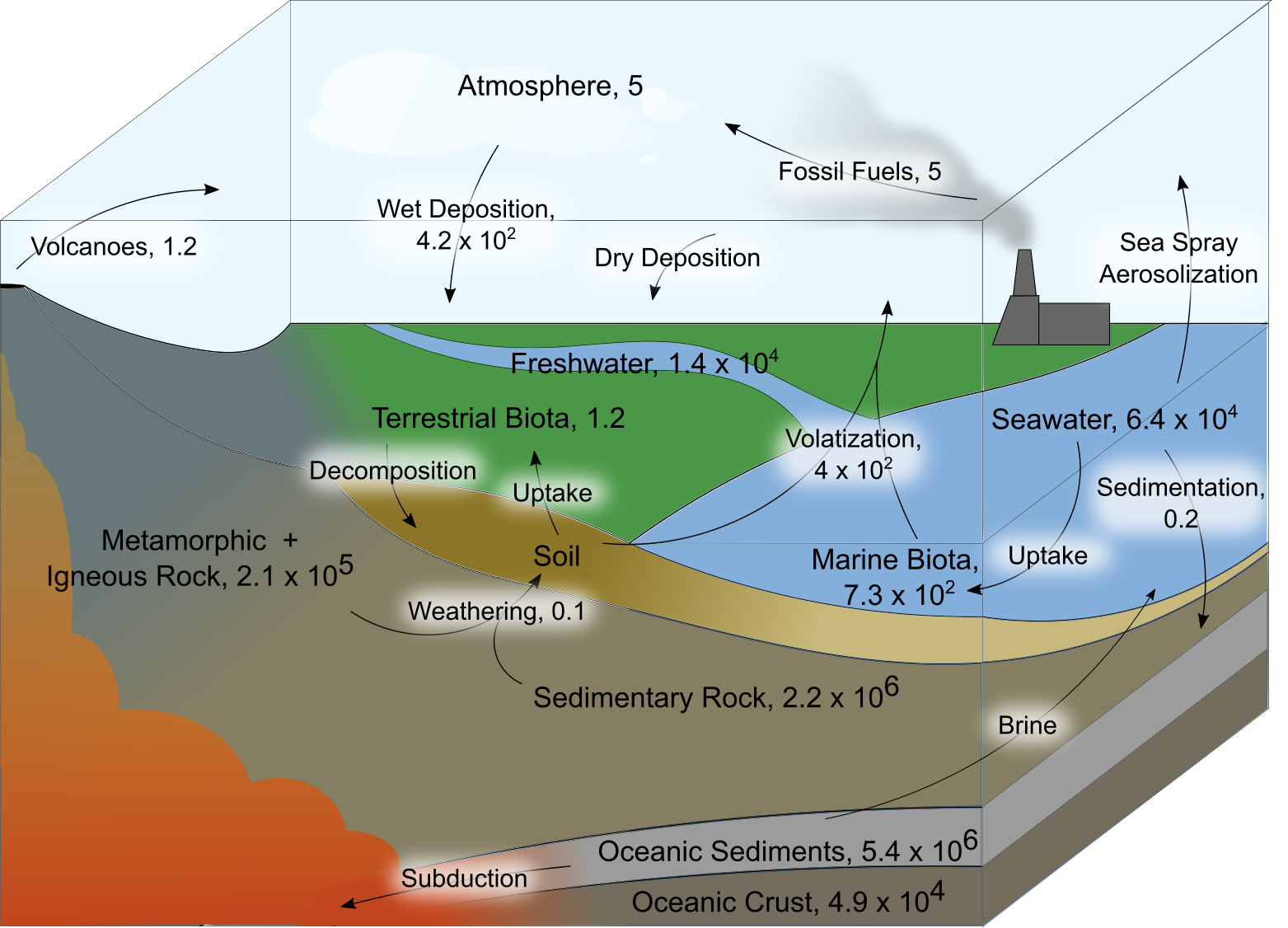
Biogeochemical iodine cycle: Inventories are in Tg iodine per year. Labeled flux arrows are in Gg iodine per year. Unlabeled inventories (sinks) and fluxes are of unknown quantities. Iodine cycles through the lithosphere, atmosphere, hydrosphere, and biosphere. Freshwater iodine is calculated by subtracting oceanic iodine from total iodine in the hydrosphere. In oceans sediments and crust, iodine is replenished by sedimentation and is cycled into seawater through release as brine during subduction. Marine biota uptake iodine from seawater where it may be volatilized by transformation to methyl iodide. Sea spray aerosolization, volcanic activity, and fossil fuel burning cycles iodine from the hydrosphere and lithosphere into the atmosphere as well, while wet and dry deposition remove iodine from the atmosphere. In soil, small quantities of iodine are cycled through weathering of parent rock. Terrestrial biota uptake and remove iodine from soil, and bacteria volatilize iodine by methylizing it.

The iodine cycle is a biogeochemical cycle that primarily consists of natural and biological processes that exchange iodine through the lithosphere, hydrosphere, and atmosphere. Iodine exists in many forms, but in the environment, it generally has an oxidation state of −1, 0, or +5.

== Oceanic cycling ==
Iodine in the ocean exists mostly in oceanic sediments and seawater. During subduction of oceanic crust and seawater, most of the iodine cycles into seawater through brine, while a minor amount is cycled into the mantle. Marine biota, including seaweed and fish, accumulate iodine from the seawater and return it during decomposition. Sedimentation of oceanic iodine replenishes the ocean sediment sink.

The losses of iodine from the oceanic sink are to the atmospheric sink. Sea spray aerosolization accounts for a portion of this loss. However, the majority of the iodine cycled into the atmosphere occurs through biological conversion of iodide and iodate to methyl forms, primarily methyl iodide. Algae, phytoplankton, and bacteria are involved in reducing the stable Iodate ion to iodide, and different species produce volatile methyl iodide which leaves the oceans and forms aerosols in the atmosphere.

== Terrestrial cycling ==
Iodine rarely occurs naturally in mineral form, so it comprises a very small portion of rocks by mass. Sedimentary rocks have higher concentrations of iodine compared to metamorphic and igneous rocks. Due to the low concentration of iodine in rocks, weathering is a minor flux of iodine to soils and the freshwater hydrosphere.

Soils contain a much higher concentration of iodine compared to their parent rock, though most of it is bound to organic and inorganic matter, potentially due to microbial activity. The major source of iodine to soils is through dry and wet deposition of aerosolized iodine in the atmosphere. Due to the high production of atmospheric iodine from the oceans, both the concentration of iodine and the flux of iodine to soils is greatest near coastal regions. Plants uptake iodine from the soil through their roots and return the iodine when they decompose. Fauna that consume plants may uptake this iodine but similarly return it to soils upon decomposition. Some iodine may also be cycled into the freshwater hydrosphere through leaching and runoff, where it may return to the oceans.

Similar to oceanic iodine, the majority of iodine cycled out of soil is volatilized through conversion to methyl forms of iodine by bacteria. Unlike ocean volatilization, however, bacteria are thought to be the only organisms responsible for volatilization in soils.

== Anthropogenic influences ==
Iodine is a necessary trace nutrient for human health and is used as a product for various industries. Iodine intended for human use and consumption is taken from brines, which accounts for a minor perturbation to the global iodine cycle. A much larger anthropogenic impact is through the burning of fossil fuels, which releases iodine into the atmosphere.

Iodine-129, a radioisotope of iodine, is a waste product of nuclear power generation and weapons testing. Unless present in high concentrations, I-129 likely does not present danger to human health. Early research has attempted to use the I-129/I-127 ratio as a tracer for the iodine cycle.
