= Potassium cycle =

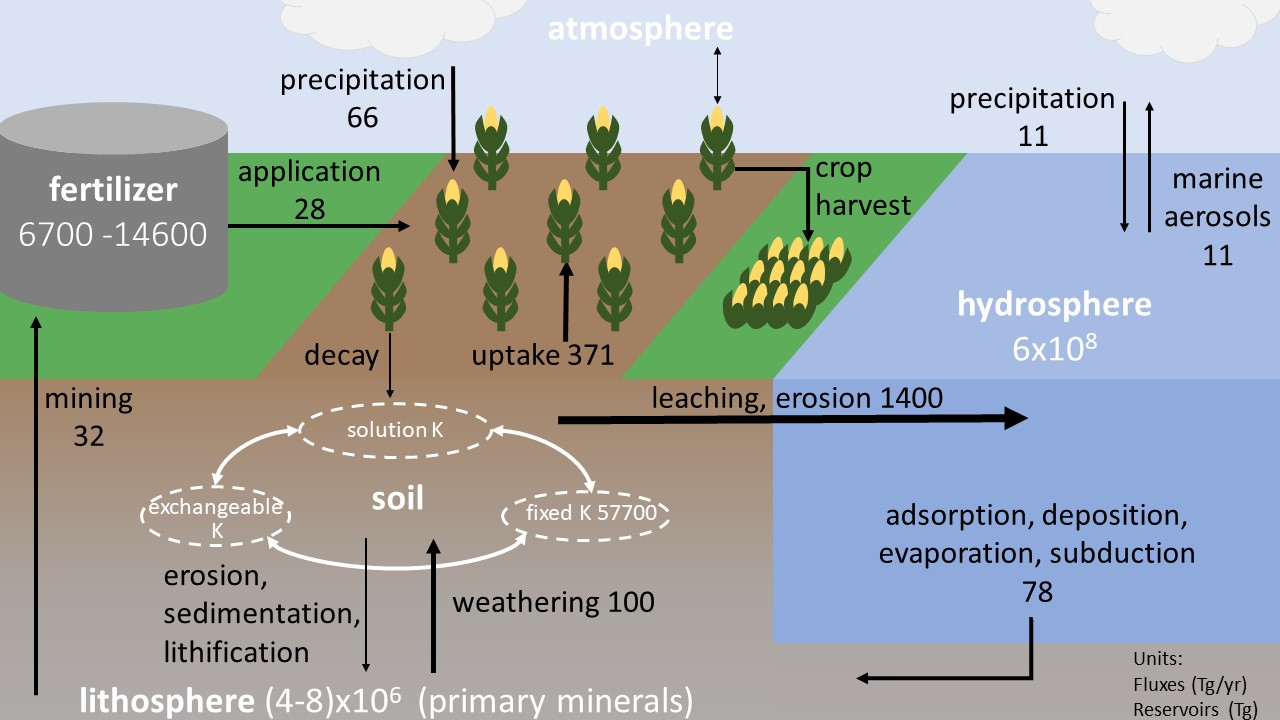
This figure represents the biogeochemical cycle for potassium. Potassium is mined from the lithosphere to manufacture fertilizer, which is applied to crop fields. Plants uptake potassium as an essential nutrient for growth and exchange it with the atmosphere. The biggest K flux is leaching and erosion of dissolved K present in soils, contributing to the large reservoir in the hydrosphere. Evaporation and precipitation processes exchange dissolved K between the hydrosphere and the atmosphere. K is deposited in marine sediments and subducted to return to the lithosphere, where it can be mined for fertilizer or weathered to return to the soil. Some flux and reservoir values could not be found. Units are in Tg/yr for fluxes and reservoir units are Tg. Arrow thickness represents relative flux values.

The potassium (K) cycle is the biogeochemical cycle that describes the movement of potassium throughout the Earth's lithosphere, biosphere, atmosphere, and hydrosphere.

== Functions ==
Along with nitrogen and phosphorus, potassium is one of the three major nutrients that plants require in large quantities. Potassium is essential to stomata control in plants and is also essential for muscles contraction in humans.

== Lithosphere and Soil ==
By weight, K totals to 2.6% of the Earth's crust. Stored in primary minerals (feldspar, biotite, and muscovite), chemical weathering releases potassium into the soil to account for up to 11% of plant demand. Some plants and bacteria also release organic acids into the soil that make K accessible for their use.

Potassium exists in its highest concentrations in the upper most layers of soil, stored in three pools: fixed K, exchangeable K, and solution K. Fixed K accounts for 96-99% of soil K and is stored in feldspar, mica, and illite minerals. Exchangeable K is potassium adsorbed onto clay particles and organic matter and accounts for 1-2% of total soil K. Potassium in soil solution is the most readily available form of K for plants to absorb, but only amounts to 0.1-0.2% of total soil K.

Reserves of potassium exist in ores and evaporites of potassium chloride (KCl) found in Germany, France, Canada, the United States, and Dead Sea brine. An estimated 32 × 10^{6} tonnes (32 Tg) of potassium are mined from the Earth each year, of which 28 × 10^{6} tonnes (28 Tg) are applied to crop fields annually. Potassium is most commonly applied as potassium chloride (KCl), but also referred to as potash and K_{2}O. Application of potassium is necessary in agriculture because the removal of potassium from the soil through plant uptake and crop removal occurs at a faster rate than the replacement through rock weathering. At the current consumption rate, K_{2}O reserves are expected to last 100 years. Potassium depletion in soils can be minimized by leaving crop residues on soils, allowing the plant matter to decay and release their stored potassium back into the soil.

== Biosphere ==
The most abundant ion in plant cells is the potassium ion. Plants take up potassium for plant growth and function. A portion of potassium uptake in plants can be attributed to weathering of primary minerals, but plants can also ‘pump’ potassium from deeper soil layers to increase levels of surface K. Potassium stored in plant matter can be returned to the soil during decomposition, especially in areas of higher rainfall that experience higher leaching rates. Potassium leaching occurs at higher rates than nitrogen and phosphorus, likely because it only exists in the soluble ion form (K^{+}) in the plant. Nitrogen and phosphorus are typically incorporated into large, complex molecules that are more difficult to leach through cell membranes than the small K^{+} ion. Deciduous plants that lose their leaves will relocate 10-32% of potassium for use in other areas of the plant before abscission.

== Atmosphere ==
Some potassium is exchanged between plants and the atmosphere through organic aerosols released from plant leaves. Atmospheric potassium deposition varies from 0.7 to greater than 100 kg ha^{−1} yr^{−1} depending on geographic location and climate. Additionally, marine aerosols can evaporate into the atmosphere and return via precipitation.

== Hydrosphere ==
The hydrosphere is the largest reservoir for potassium, holding an estimated 552.7 × 10^{12} tonnes (552.7 × 10^{6} Tg). Leaching and erosion carry 1.4 × 10^{9} tonnes (1400 Tg) yr^{−1} of potassium in soil solution into groundwater, rivers, and oceans. Some potassium in the atmosphere also enters the hydrosphere through precipitation. Potassium in sediment pore fluids is removed from solution by the authigenic formation of clay, which is then subducted, along with potassium deposits and ocean basalt, to return to the lithosphere.

== See also ==
- Potassium
- Potash
