= Lead cycle =

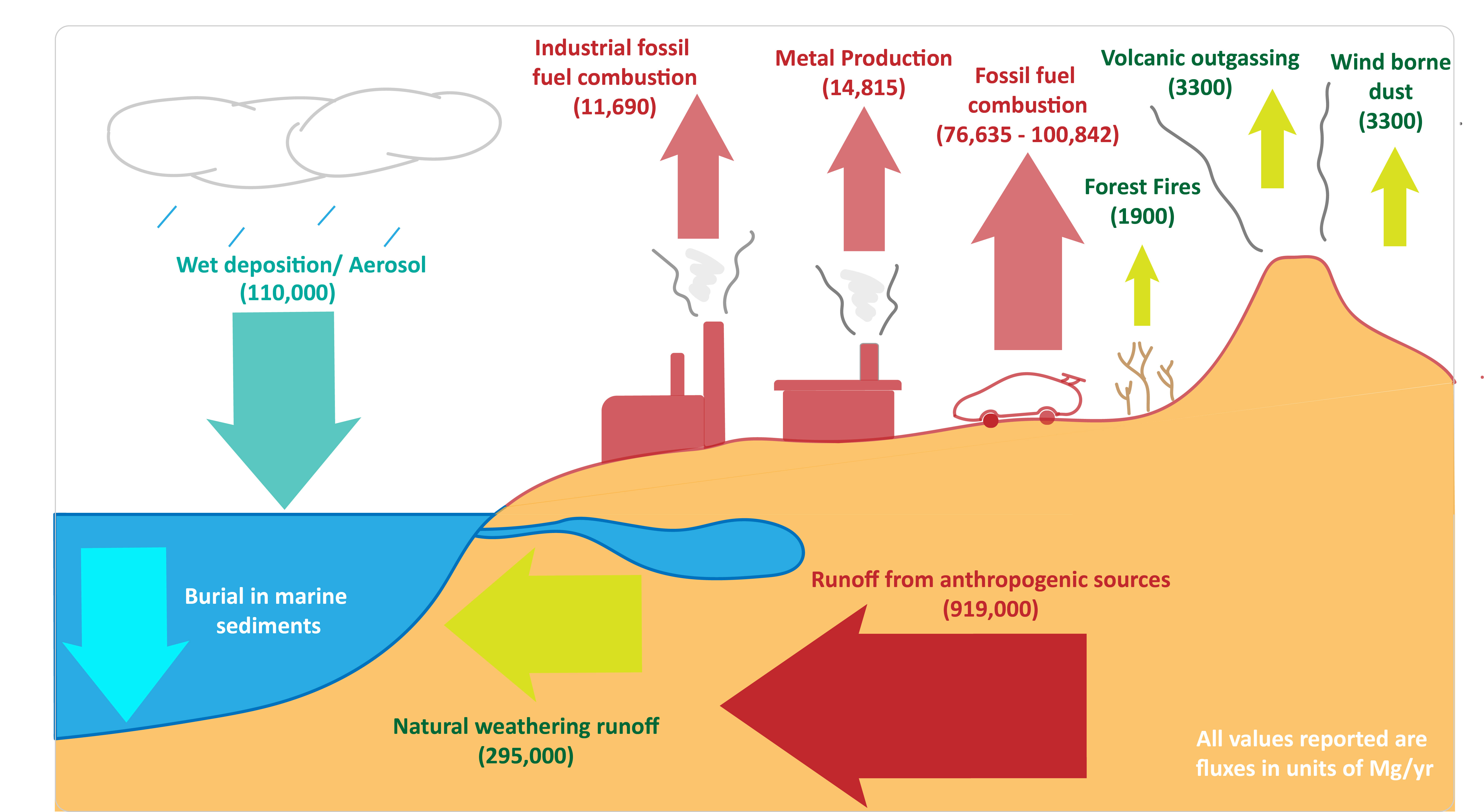
Simplified schematic of the lead cycle. All values indicated are fluxes with unit of Mg/yr; the values have been obtained from Cullen and McAlister (2017). The size of the arrows are approximately proportional to their flux. The major reservoir for lead is the crust and mantle with a concentration of 11–14.8 ppm. The natural sources (green arrows) of lead in the atmosphere are volcanic eruptions, plant exudates, forest fires, extraterrestrial particles, radioactive decay, and physical and chemical weathering of rocks. The major anthropogenic sources (red arrows) are mining and smelting of ores, non-ferrous metal production, stationary fossil fuel combustion platforms, and mobile fossil fuel combustion platforms. The sinks (blue arrows) of lead are wet deposition of aerosols on to the ocean water surface and the subsequent burial in deep sediments. Since lead is toxic to life, there are no predominant metabolic pathways.

The lead cycle is the biogeochemical cycle of lead through the atmosphere, lithosphere, biosphere, and hydrosphere, which has been influenced by anthropogenic activities.

== Natural lead sources ==
Lead (Pb) is a heavy trace element and is formed by the radioactive decay of uranium and thorium. In crustal rocks, it is present as the lead sulfide mineral galena. Natural sources of lead in the lead cycle include wind borne dust, volcanic outgassing, and forest fires. Natural weathering of rocks by physical and chemical agents can mobilize lead in soils. Mobilized lead can react to form oxides or carbonates. It can co-precipitate with other minerals by being occluded through surface adsorption and complexation.

== Anthropogenic lead cycle ==
Anthropogenic activities have accelerated lead mobilization to the environment. The majority of anthropogenic lead comes from non-ferrous metal manufacturing plants, mining and smelting of ores, stationary and mobile fossil fuel combustion platforms, and lead batteries. These activities produce very fine micron-sized Pb particles that can be transported as aerosols. Anthropogenic lead fluxes decreased from the 1980s to the 2000s as a result of global regulation and outlawing of leaded gasoline. However, the global production in lead has seen a steady rise in the 21st century.

== Lead accumulation in the ocean ==
Wet deposition removes lead from the atmosphere to the surface ocean. Precipitation leads to solubilization of aerosols and washout of particulates. Pb concentrations in the oceans is dependent on wet deposition and the concentration of Pb present in atmosphere. The main sink for lead is burial in marine sediments
