= Lithium cycle =

The lithium cycle (Li) is the biogeochemical cycle of lithium through the lithosphere and hydrosphere.

== Overview ==
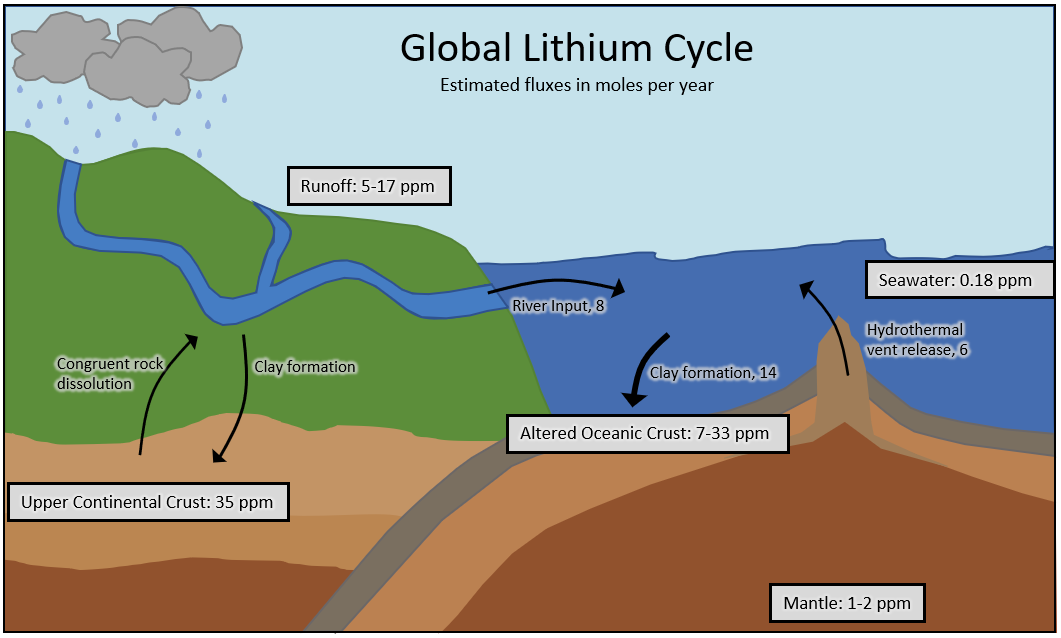
Biogeochemical lithium cycle

In the diagram above, lithium sinks are described in concentrations (ppm) and displayed as boxes. Fluxes are shown as arrows and are in units of moles per year. Continental rocks containing lithium are dissolved, transferring lithium to rivers or secondary minerals. Dissolved lithium in run-off travels to the ocean. Fluid release from hydrothermal vents contributes to oceanic lithium reserves while lithium is removed from the ocean by secondary mineral formation.

== Sinks and fluxes ==
Lithium is widely distributed in the lithosphere and mantle as a trace element in silicate minerals. Lithium concentrations are highest in the upper continental and oceanic crusts. Chemical weathering at Earth’s surface dissolves lithium in primary minerals and releases it to rivers and ground waters. Lithium can be removed from solution by formation of secondary minerals like clays or zeolites. In contrast, in low-temperature surface environments, iron oxides have a limited impact on the lithium cycle.

Rivers eventually feed into the ocean, providing approximately 50% of marine inputs. The remainder of lithium inputs come from hydrothermal venting at mid-ocean ridges, where lithium is released from the mantle. Secondary clay formation removes dissolved lithium from seawater to the authigenic clays and to the altered oceanic crust.

== Geochemical tracers ==
Lithium isotopes have potential as viable geochemical tracers for processes such as silicate rock weathering and crust/mantle recycling due to significant lithium isotope fractionation during these processes.
