= Chromium cycle =

Biogeochemical cycle

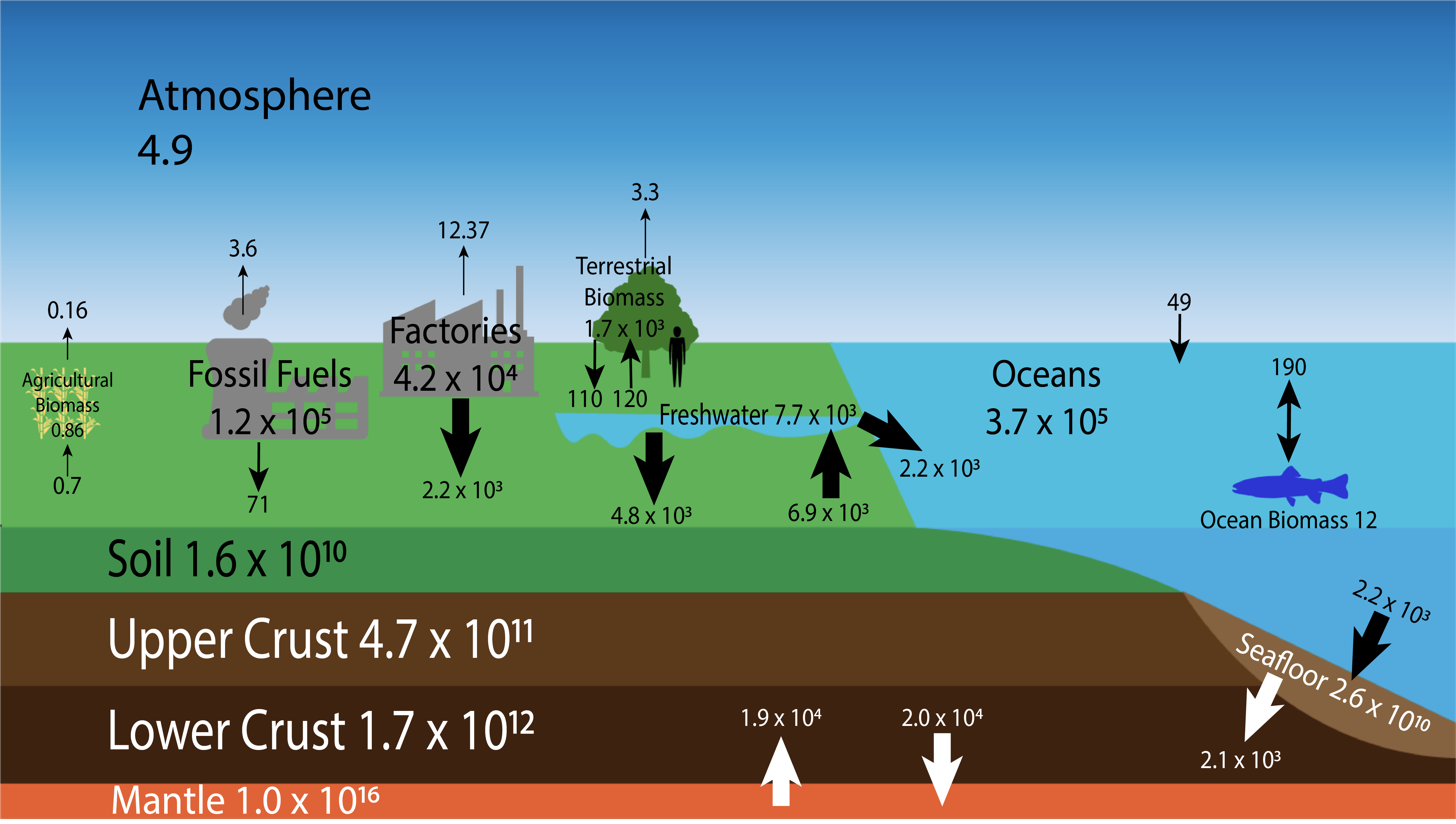
Chromium cycles through the Earth atmosphere, soil, freshwater bodies, rivers, oceans, crust and mantle. The arrows indicate fluxes given in gigagrams (1,000 metric tons) of chromium per year. The corresponding stocks (inventories) indicate reservoirs of chromium given in gigagrams of chromium.

The chromium cycle is the biogeochemical cycle of chromium through the atmosphere, hydrosphere, biosphere and lithosphere.

== Biogeochemical cycle ==
=== Terrestrial weathering and river transport ===
Chromium has two common oxidation states relevant for environmental conditions: trivalent chromium, Cr(III) (reduced form), and hexavalent chromium, Cr(VI) (most oxidized form). The poorly soluble trivalent chromium cation (Cr^{3+}) strongly adsorbs onto clay particles and particulate organic matter, whereas the highly toxic and carcinogenic hexavalent chromate anion (CrO^{2−}_{4}) is soluble and non-sorbed, making it a toxic contaminant in environmental systems. Chromium commonly exists in soil and rocks as highly insoluble trivalent chromium, such as chromite (Fe^{(II)}Cr^{(III)}_{2}O_{4}, or FeO·Cr_{2}O_{3}), a mixed oxide mineral of the spinel group resembling magnetite (Fe_{3}O_{4}, Fe^{(II)}Fe^{(III)}_{2}O_{4}, or FeO·Fe_{2}O_{3}). Terrestrial weathering could cause trivalent chromium to be oxidized by manganese oxides to hexavalent chromium, which is then solubilized and cycled to the ocean through rivers. Estuaries release particulate chromium from rivers to the sea, increasing the dissolved fluxes of chromium to the ocean.

=== Oceanic cycling ===
Soluble hexavalent chromium is the most common type of chromium in oceans, where over 70% of dissolved chromium in the ocean is found in oxyanions such as chromate (CrO^{2−}_{4}). Soluble trivalent chromium is also found in the oceans where complexation with organic ligands occurs. Chromium is estimated to have a residence time of 6,300 years in the oceans. Hexavalent chromium is reduced to trivalent chromium in oxygen minimum zones or at the surface of the ocean by divalent iron and organic ligands. There are four sinks of chromium from the oceans: (1) oxic sediments in pelagic zones, (2) hypoxic sediments in continental margins, (3) anoxic or sulfidic sediments in basins or fjords with permanently anoxic or sulfidic (euxinic) bottom waters, and (4) marine carbonates.

=== Influence from other biogeochemical cycles ===
Manganese (III) can oxidize Cr(III) to Cr(VI) when complexed with organic ligands. This causes contaminant mobilization of Cr(VI), and also reduces Mn(III) to Mn(II), which can then be oxidized back to Mn(III) by oxygen.

== Methods for chromium tracking ==
Isotopic fractionation of chromium has become a valuable tool for monitoring environmental chromium contamination through recent advancements in mass spectrometry. Isotope fractionation during river transport is determined by local redox conditions based on dissolved organic matter in rivers.
