= Boron cycle =

Biogeochemical cycle

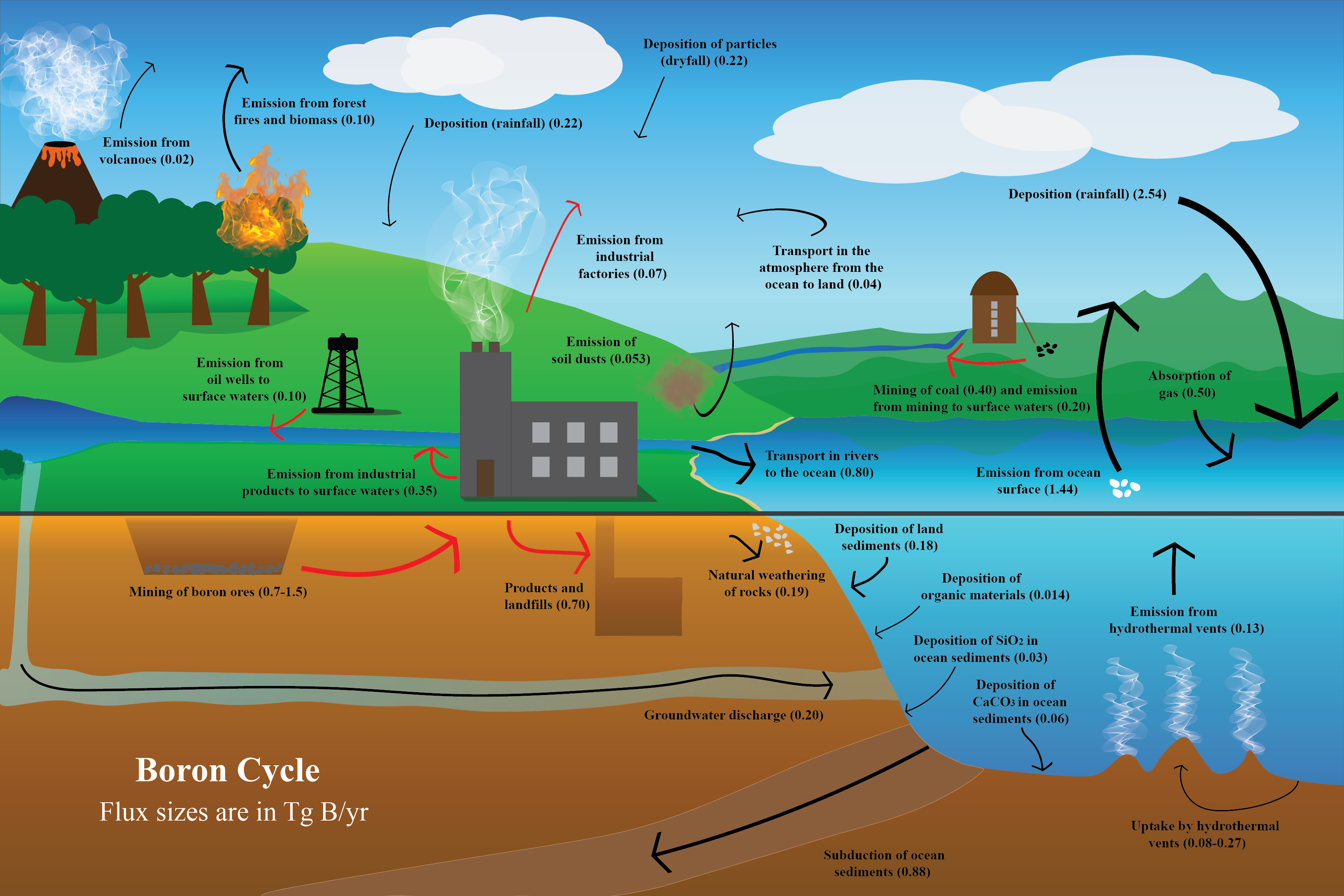
Boron cycles through the atmosphere, lithosphere, biosphere, and hydrosphere. The major flux between reservoirs are depicted with arrows, where the size/width of the arrow corresponds to the magnitude of the flux. All flux values are given in Tg B/yr (= 10^{12} gB/yr). Red arrows indicate anthropogenic emissions, while the black arrows indicate natural emissions. (Note: The dominant fluxes of B occur from anthropogenic and marine sources, where the total anthropogenic flux (2.3 Tg B/yr) is more than half of the total B input to the ocean (4.2 Tg B/yr)..)

The boron cycle is the biogeochemical cycle of boron through the atmosphere, lithosphere, biosphere, and hydrosphere.

== Atmospheric and terrestrial fluxes ==
Boron in the atmosphere is derived from soil dusts, volcanic emissions, forest fires, evaporation of boric acid from seawater, biomass emissions, and sea spray. Sea salt aerosols are the largest flux to the atmosphere. On land, boron cycles through the biosphere by rock weathering, and wet and dry deposition from the atmosphere.

== Ocean fluxes ==
The marine biosphere circulates a large reservoir of boron. Dissolved boron is delivered to the ocean by river transport, wet deposition, submarine groundwater discharge, and hydrothermal vents. Boron is lost from the oceans in emissions from the ocean surface, deposition of organic materials and sediments (mostly carbonates), and the subduction of ocean sediment.

== Anthropogenic impacts ==
The boron cycle has been significantly impacted by human activity. Major anthropogenic fluxes are coal mining and combustion, oil production, emissions from industrial factories, biofuels, landfills, and mining and processing of boron ores. Anthropogenic boron fluxes to the hydrosphere and atmosphere have increased and anthropogenic fluxes now exceed the natural boron fluxes.
