= Cadmium cycle =

Natural process of Cadmium deposition

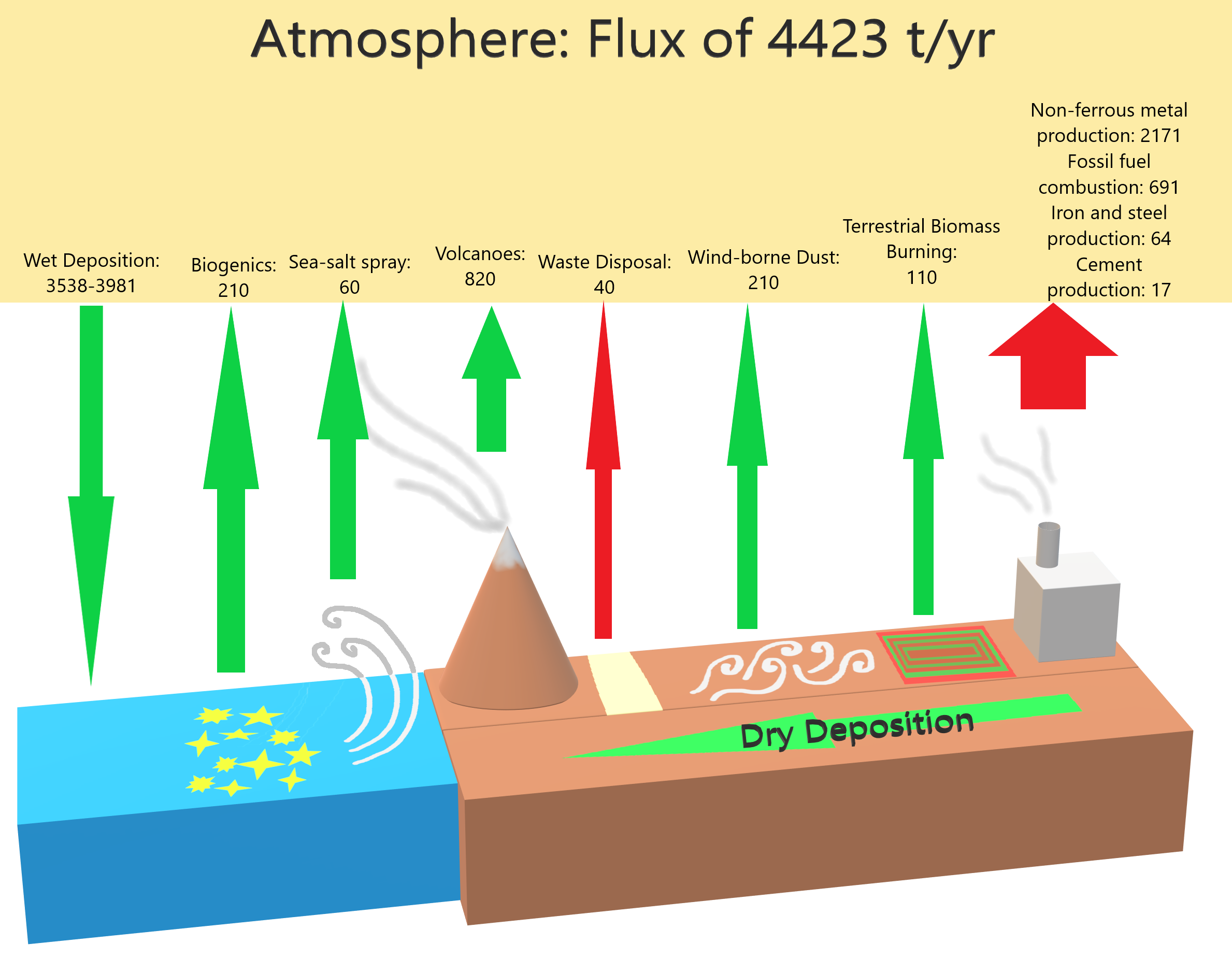
Cadmium cycle (anthropogenic and natural) showing fluxes and reservoir sizes. Dissolved riverine flux is 3,000 t/yr and particulate riverine flux is 23,000 t/yr. Fluxes are in t/yr.

The cadmium cycle is a biogeochemical cycle of dispersion and deposition of cadmium through the atmosphere, biosphere, pedosphere, and hydrosphere. Cadmium typically exists in the environment with an oxidation state of +2 but can be found with an oxidation state of +1 (though quite uncommon).

== Sources ==
Atmospheric sources are dominated by anthropogenic emissions (non-ferrous metal production, fossil fuel combustion, iron and steel production, waste disposal, and cement production), with minor introduction of cadmium through natural emissions (volcanoes, dust, biomass burning, and sea spray). Cadmium introduced as powders and aerosols through anthropogenic sources and natural sources can be detected in almost all corners of the globe. Cadmium is highly soluble and cadmium concentrations are rapidly depleted after wind transport as particles, aerosols, and water droplets. Typically, cadmium deposition decreases latitudinally from the source.

== Terrestrial cycling ==
The majority of cadmium deposition to soils and freshwater is due to anthropogenic atmospheric emissions, contaminants in biosolids, and contaminants in fertilizers. Dry deposition accounts for 30-70% of terrestrial inputs. Cadmium is highly mobile in soils and becomes mineral-associated over time. Higher pH and temperature favor cadmium incorporation into minerals, while lower pH and temperature makes cadmium more soluble. Dissolved cadmium circulates through freshwater systems before introduction to larger bodies of water. In rivers, dissolved cadmium ranges from nanomolar to micromolar concentrations.

== Oceanic cycling ==
The vast majority of marine cadmium (80-90%) comes from wet deposition. Cadmium behaves similarly to nutrients such as phosphate and zinc: dissolved concentrations depend heavily on uptake, assimilation, and deposition by phytoplankton and diatoms. Dissolved cadmium concentrations are sub-nanomolar in the surface ocean and increase with depth, with a maximum in the thermocline. Like other nutrients, cadmium is lowest in the North Atlantic (~0.3 nM). Higher concentrations (up to 1 nM) occur in the deep Indian, Southern, and Pacific oceans due to water mass aging during thermohaline circulation. Coastal waters range from 0.2 to 0.9 nM, denoting a significant terrestrial input.

== See also ==
- Cadmium
- Carbonic anhydrase
- Diatoms
