= Environmental soil science =

Study of the interaction of humans with the pedosphere

Environmental soil science is the study of the interaction of humans with the pedosphere as well as critical aspects of the biosphere, the lithosphere, the hydrosphere, and the atmosphere. Environmental soil science addresses both the fundamental and applied aspects of the field including: buffers and surface water quality, vadose zone functions, septic drain field site assessment and function, land treatment of wastewater, stormwater, erosion control, soil contamination with metals and pesticides, remediation of contaminated soils, restoration of wetlands, soil degradation, nutrient management, movement of viruses and bacteria in soils and waters, bioremediation, application of molecular biology and genetic engineering to development of soil microbes that can degrade hazardous pollutants, land use, global warming, acid rain, and the study of anthropogenic soils, such as terra preta. Much of the research done in environmental soil science is produced through the use of models.

== See also ==
- Soil functions

== Bibliography ==
- Hillel, D., J.L.. Hatfield, D.S. Powlson, C. Rosenweig, K. M. Scow, M.J. Singer and D.L. Sparks. Editors. (2004) Encyclopedia of Soils in the Environment, Four-Volume Set, Volume 1-4, ISBN 0-12-348530-4
