= Copper cycle =

The copper cycle is the biogeochemical cycle of natural and anthropogenic exchanges of copper between reservoirs in the hydrosphere, atmosphere, biosphere, and lithosphere. Human mining and extraction activities have exerted large influence on the copper cycle.

== Overview ==
The diagram immediately below shows the global copper reservoirs labeled with sizes in μg/g inside parentheses. The largest copper reservoirs are metal use (production, fabrication, use, discard), the core, and the crust. Fluxes between reservoirs are shown as arrows with units of Gg Cu/yr. The thickness of the arrows represents the flux size. The anthropogenic fluxes are in red and the natural fluxes are in navy blue. The largest fluxes are from copper metal use and soil, between the crust and mantle, and from the freshwater to oceans. The flux of copper from micrometeorites to the atmosphere is difficult to measure, but is relatively constant over time. It is assumed that the rate of cosmic flux is uniform everywhere. The median of all the fluxes post 1980 was used in the figure.

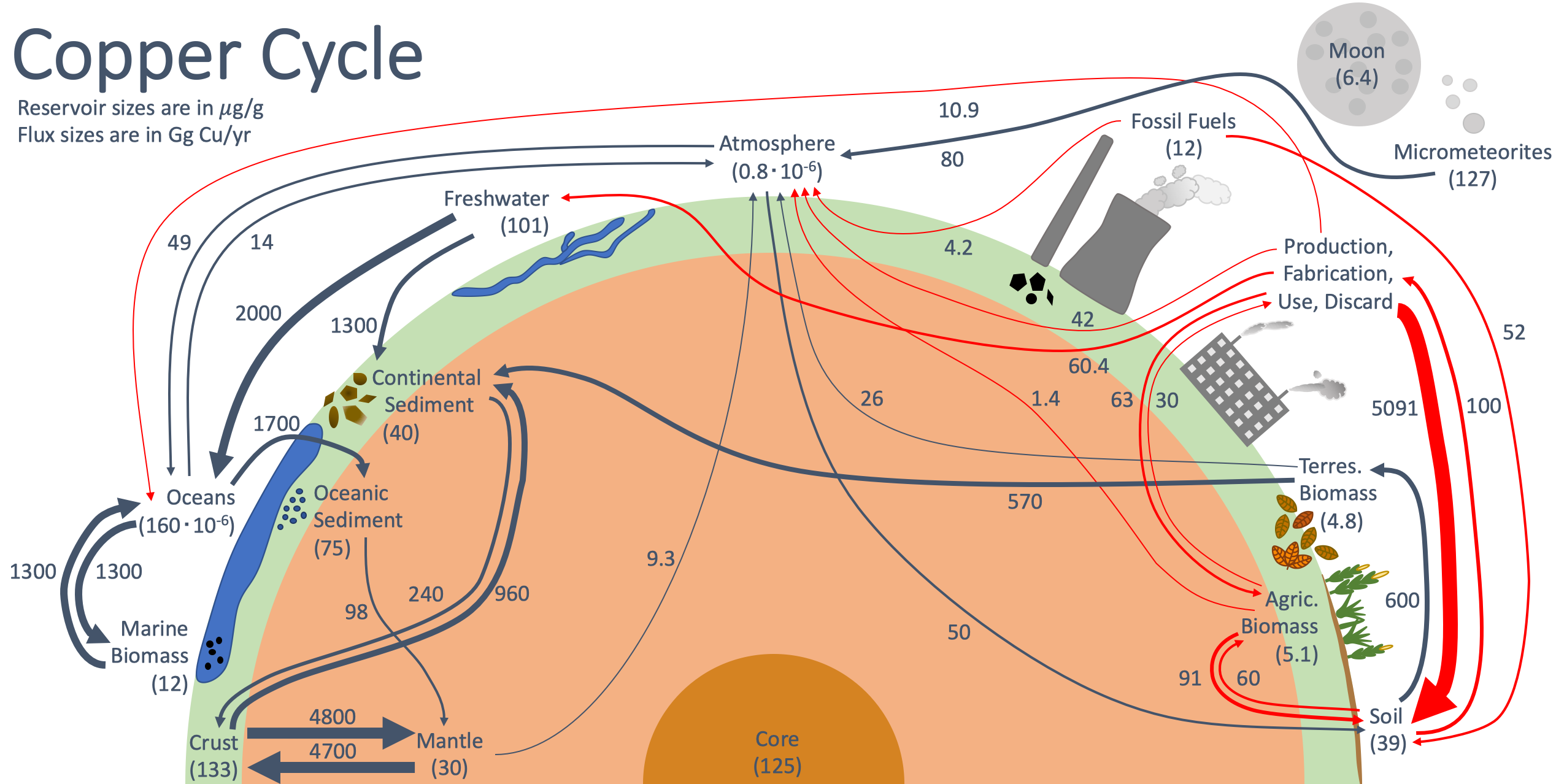
Main global reservoirs and fluxes of the copper cycle

== Copper reservoirs ==
Natural copper reservoirs include the Earth's core, mantle, and crust. Crustal rocks contain average copper abundance of hundred parts per million. Other natural reservoirs are terrestrial biomass, sediments, freshwater, oceans, and the atmosphere. Anthropogenic reservoirs include copper's manufacturing life cycle (production, fabrication, usage, and discard), fossil fuels, and agricultural biomass. In outer space, there is also copper on the moon and in micrometeorites.

== Copper fluxes ==
=== Natural fluxes ===
Copper is exchanged between the mantle and the crust through volcanoes, hydrothermal vents, and subduction zones. Volcanoes and hydrothermal vents degas material from the mantle, which condenses into particulate form. Copper is recycled back to the mantle through subducting ocean crust.

As the Earth's crust weathers, soil and sediment is formed, and some copper is mobilized from freshwater to the ocean. Copper in the soil is taken up by plants and then released back into the soil when the plants decompose. Wildfires or burning of natural biomass releases copper into the atmosphere.

=== Anthropogenic fluxes ===
Copper is present in coal and unrefined crude oil. When fossil fuels are combusted, copper is released into the atmosphere and soils. Copper cycles through agricultural biomass when animals eat plants containing trace amounts of copper. The copper is then returned to the soil when manure is applied as fertilizer. Agricultural burning also releases copper into the atmosphere.

Copper mining contributes significantly to copper emissions into fresh waters. Copper is also introduced into freshwater during metal corrosion, degradation, and abrasion of copper. Scrap copper metal is commonly recycled, but at the end of its manufacturing life cycle, it is discarded to landfills, which can leach significant copper into fresh waters.
