= Manganese cycle =

Biogeochemical cycle

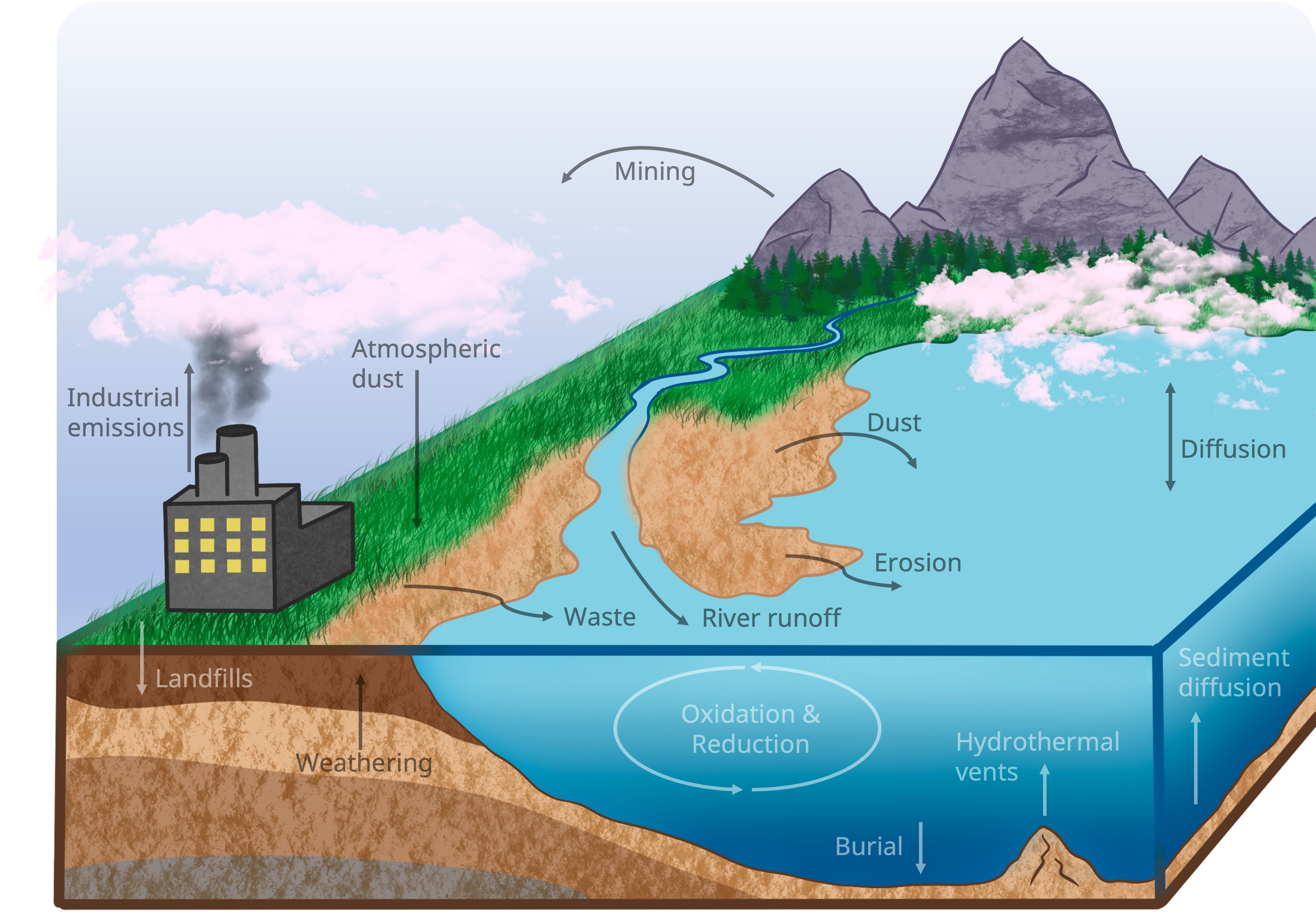
Manganese cycles through the lithosphere, the hydrosphere, and the atmosphere. Arrows show processes and direction of transport.

The manganese cycle is the biogeochemical cycle of manganese through the atmosphere, hydrosphere, biosphere and lithosphere. There are bacteria that oxidise manganese to insoluble oxides, and others that reduce it to Mn^{2+} in order to use it.

Manganese is a heavy metal that comprises about 0.1% of the Earth's crust and a necessary element for biological processes. It is cycled through the Earth in similar ways to iron, but with distinct redox pathways. Human activities have impacted the fluxes of manganese among the different spheres of the Earth.

== Global manganese cycle ==
Manganese is a necessary element for biological functions such as photosynthesis, and some manganese oxidizing bacteria utilize this element in anoxic environments. Movement of manganese (Mn) among the global "spheres" (described below) is mediated by both physical and biological processes. Manganese in the lithosphere enters the hydrosphere from weathering of regolith as well as erosion and dissolution of bedrock in rivers; in solution it then makes its way into the ocean. Once in the ocean, Mn can form minerals and sink to the ocean floor where the solid phase is buried. The global manganese cycle is being altered by anthropogenic influences, such as mining and mineral processing for industrial use, as well as through the burning of fossil fuels.

== Lithosphere ==
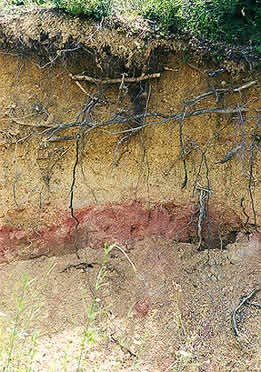
Manganese precipitates in soils in the form of manganese-iron oxide minerals, which promote nutrient and organic matter accumulation due to their high surface area.

Manganese is the tenth most abundant metal in the Earth's crust, making up approximately 0.1% of the total composition, or about 0.019 mol kg^{−1}, which is found mostly in the oceanic crust.

=== Crust ===
Manganese (Mn) commonly precipitates in igneous rocks in the form of early-stage crystalline minerals, which, once exposed to water and/or oxygen, are highly soluble and easily oxidized to form Mn oxides on the surfaces of rocks. Dendritic crystals rich in Mn form when microbes reprecipitate the Mn from the rocks on which they develop onto the surface after utilizing the Mn for their metabolism. For certain cyanobacteria found on desert varnish samples, for example, it has been found that manganese is used as a catalytic antioxidant to facilitate survival in the harsh sunlight and water conditions they face on desert rock surfaces.

=== Soil ===
Manganese is an important soil micronutrient for plant growth, playing an essential role as a catalyst in the oxygen-evolving complex of photosystem II, a photosynthetic pathway. Soil fungi in particular have been found to oxidize the reduced, soluble form of manganese (Mn^{2+}) under anaerobic conditions, and may reprecipitate it as manganese oxides (Mn^{+3} to Mn^{+7}) under aerobic conditions, where the preferred metabolic pathway typically involves the utilization of oxygen. Although not all iron-reducing bacteria have the capability of reducing manganese, there is overlap in the taxa that can perform both metabolisms; these organisms are very common in a range of environmental conditions. Challenges however persist in isolating these microbes in cultures.

Depending on the pH, organic substrate availability, and oxygen concentration, Mn can either behave as an oxidation catalyst or an electron receptor. Though much of the total Mn that is cycled in soil is biologically-mediated, some inorganic reactions also contribute to Mn oxidation or precipitation of Mn oxides. The reduction potential (pe) and pH are two known constraints on the solubility of Mn in soils. As pH increases, Mn speciation becomes less sensitive to variations in pe. In acidic (pH = 5) soils with high reduction potentials (pe > 8), the forms of Mn are mostly reducible, with exchangeable and soluble Mn decreasing dramatically in concentration with increases in pe. Mn is also found in inorganic chelation complexes, where Mn forms coordinate bonds with SO_{4}^{2-}, HCO_{3}^{−}, and Cl^{−} ions. These complexes are important for organic matter stabilization in soils, as they have high surface areas and interact with organic matter through adsorption.

== Hydrosphere ==
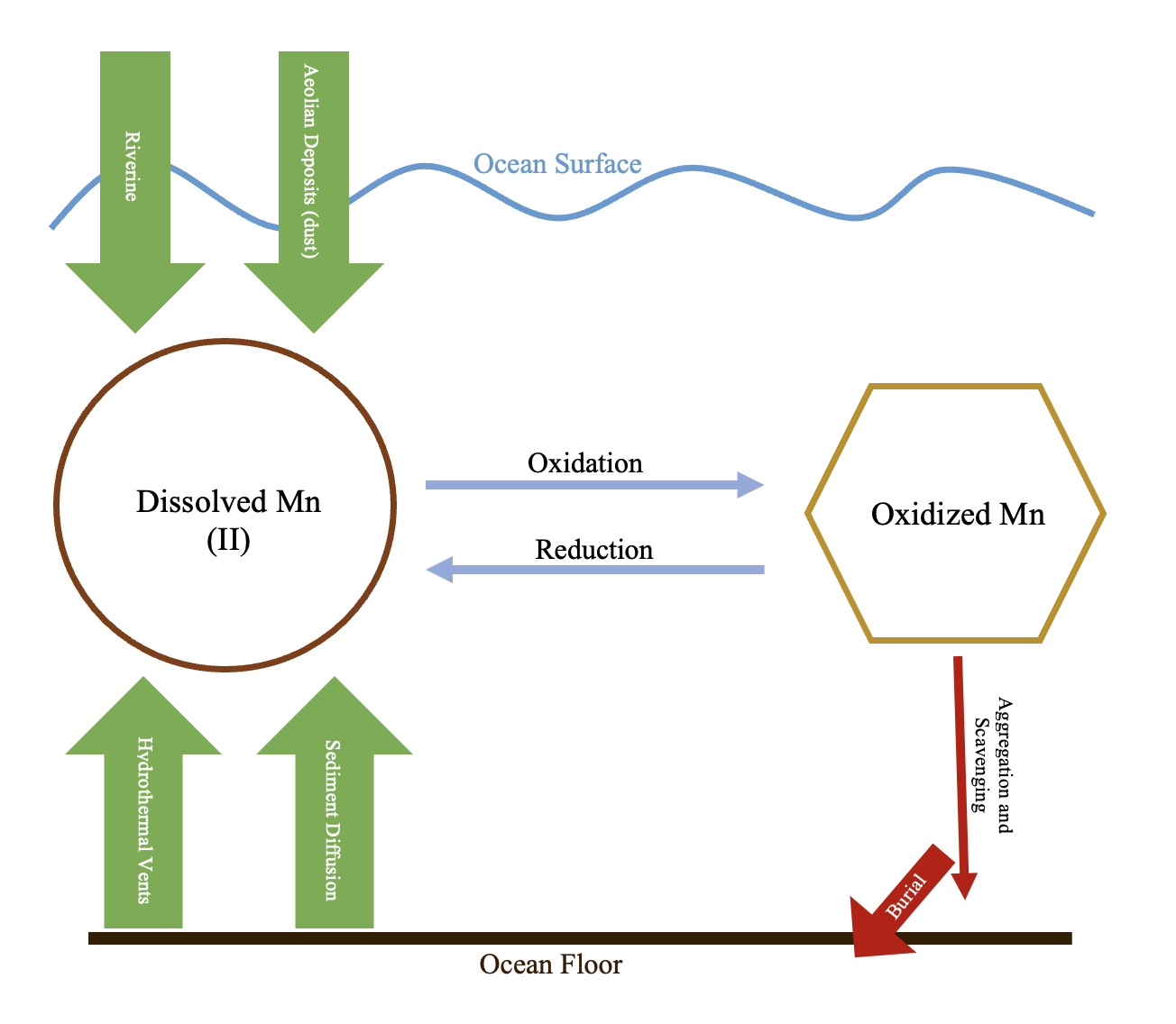
Manganese enters the ocean as dust or runoff in the form of dissolved Mn (II). It leaves the ocean via diffusion. This dissolved Mn is oxidized and reduced by organisms, and then sinks to the ocean floor. As it sinks it undergoes aggregation or scavenging. From the ocean floor, Mn is lost through burial, and is inputted into the ocean cycle by sediment diffusion and hydrothermal vents.

Iron (Fe) and Manganese (Mn) similarities in their respective cycles and are often studied together. Both have similar sources in the hydrosphere, which are hydrothermal vent fluxes, dust inputs, and weathering of rocks. The major removal of Mn from the ocean involves similar processes to Fe as well, with the most abundant removal from the hydrosphere via biological uptake, oxidative precipitation, and scavenging. Microorganisms oxidize the bioavailable Mn(II) to form Mn(IV), an insoluble manganese oxide that aggregates to form particulate matter that can then sink to the ocean floor. Manganese is important in aquatic ecosystems for photosynthesis and other biological functions.

=== Freshwater and estuary ===
Advection from tidal flows re-suspends estuary beds and can unearth manganese. The particulate manganese is dissolved via reduction that forms Mn (II), adding it to the internal cycle of manganese in organisms in the ecosystem. Estuary biogeochemistry is heavily influenced by tidal oscillations, temperature, and pH changes, and thus the manganese input into the internal cycling is variable. Mn in rivers and streams typically has a lower residence time than estuaries, and a large majority of the Mn is soluble Mn (II). In these freshwater ecosystems, the manganese cycling is depended on sediment fluxes that provide an influx of Mn into the system. Oxidation of Mn (II) from sediment drives the redox reactions that fuel the biogeochemical processes with Mn, as well as Mn reducing microbes.

=== Marine ===
In the ocean, different patterns of manganese cycling are seen. In the photic zone, there is a decrease in Mn particulate formation during the daytime, as rates of microbially catalyzed oxidation decrease and photo-dissolution of Mn oxides increases. The GEOTRACES program has led the production of the first global manganese model, in which predictions of global manganese distribution can be made. This global model found strong removal rates of Mn as water moves from the Atlantic Ocean surface to the North Atlantic deep water resulting in Mn depletion in water moving southward along the thermohaline conveyor. Overall, when looking at organism interactions with manganese, it is known that redox reactions play a key role, as well as that Mn has important biological functions, however far less is known about uptake and remineralization processes such as with iron.

== Early Earth ==
Terrestrial manganese has existed since the formation of Earth around 4.6 Ga. The Sun and the Solar System formed during the collapse of a molecular cloud populated with many trace metals, including manganese. The chemical composition of the molecular cloud determined the composition of the many celestial bodies that form within it. Nearby supernova explosions populated the cloud with manganese; the most common manganese-forming supernovae are Type Ia supernovae.

The early Earth contained very little free oxygen (O_{2}) until the Great Oxygenation Event around 2.35 Ga. Without O_{2}, redox cycling of Mn was limited. Instead, soluble Mn(II) was only released into the oceans via silicate weathering on igneous rocks and supplied through hydrothermal vents. The increase in Mn oxidation occurred during the Archean Eon (> 2.5 Ga), whereas the first evidence of manganese redox cycling appears ~ 2.4 Ga, before the Great Oxygenation Event and during the Paleoproterozoic Era.

Although the Great Oxygenation Event raised the abundance of oxygen on Earth, the oxygen levels were still relatively low compared to modern levels. It is believed that many primary producers were anoxygenic phototrophs and took advantage of abundant hydrogen sulfide (H_{2}S) to catalyze photosynthesis. Anoxygenic phototrophy and oxygenic photosynthesis both require electron donors, with all known forms of anoxygenic phototrophy relying on reaction center electron acceptors with reduction potentials around 250-500 mV. Oxygenic photosynthesis requires reduction potentials around 1250 mV. It has been hypothesized that this wide difference in reduction potential indicates an evolutionary missing link in the origin of oxygenic photosynthesis. Mn(II) is the leading candidate for bridging this gap. The water-oxidizing complex, a key component of PSII, begins with the oxidation of Mn(II), which, along with additional evidence, strongly supports the hypothesis that manganese was a necessary step in the evolution of oxygenic photosynthesis.

== Anthropogenic influences ==
While manganese naturally occurs in the environment, the global Mn cycle is influenced through anthropogenic activities. Mn is utilized in many commercial products, such as fireworks, leather, paint, glass, fertilizer, animal feed, and dry cell batteries. However, the effect of Mn pollution from these sources is minor compared to that of mining and mineral processing. The burning of fossil fuels, such as coal and natural gas, further contribute to the anthropogenic cycling of Mn.

=== Mining and mineral processing ===
Anthropogenic influences on the manganese cycle mainly stem from industrial mining and mineral processing, specifically, within the iron and steel industries. Mn is used in iron and steel production to improve hardness, strength, and stiffness, and is the primary component used in low-cost stainless steel and aluminum alloy production. Anthropogenic mining and mineral processing has spread Mn through three methods: wastewater discharge, industrial emissions, and releases in soils.

==== Wastewater discharge ====
Waste from mining and mineral processing facilities is typically separated into liquid and solid forms. Due to insufficient management and poor mining processes, especially in developing countries, liquid waste containing Mn can be discharged into bodies of water through anthropogenic effluents. Domestic wastewater and sewage sludge disposal are the main anthropogenic sources of Mn within aquatic ecosystems. In marine systems, the disposal of mine tailings contributes to aquatic anthropogenic Mn concentrations where high levels can be toxic to marine life.

==== Industrial emissions ====
The main anthropogenic influence of Mn input to the atmosphere is through industrial emissions, and roughly 80% of industrial emissions of Mn is due to steel and iron processing facilities. In the Northern Hemisphere, some of the Mn pollutants released through industrial emissions are transferred to Arctic regions through atmospheric circulation, where particulates settle and accumulate in natural bodies of water.

Such atmospheric pollution of Mn can be hazardous for humans working or living near industrial facilities. Dust and smoke containing manganese dioxide and manganese tetroxide released into the air during mining is a primary cause of manganism in humans.

==== Releases in soils ====
The solid waste disposal of substances containing Mn by industrial sources typically ends up in landfills. Additional Mn deposition in soils can result from particulate settling of Mn released through industrial emissions. An analysis of datasets on the soil chemistry of North America and Europe revealed greater than 50% of Mn in ridge soils near iron or steel processing facilities was attributed to anthropogenic industrial inputs, whether through solid waste disposal or previously airborne particulates depositing in soils.

=== Burning of fossil fuels ===
Anthropogenically sourced Mn from the burning of fossil fuels has been found in the atmosphere, hydrosphere, and lithosphere. Mn is a trace element in fly ash, a residue from the use of coal for power production, which often ends up in the atmosphere, soils, and bodies of water. Methylcyclopentadienyl Mn tricarbonyl (MMT), a gasoline additive containing Mn, also contributes to Mn anthropogenic cycling. Due to the use of MMT as a fuel additive, motor vehicles are a significant source of Mn in the atmosphere, especially in regions of high traffic activity. In some regions, roughly 40% of Mn in the atmosphere was due to exhaust from traffic. Particulate manganese phosphate, manganese sulfate, and manganese oxide are the primary emissions from MMT combustion through its usage in gasoline. A portion of these particulates eventually leave the atmosphere to settle in soils and bodies of water.
