= Zinc cycle =

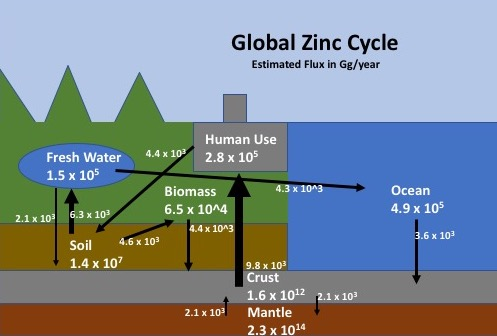
Zinc fluxes between the lithosphere and biosphere, through basins in soil, biomass, water systems, and industry. Estimated fluxes are shown as labeled arrows in Gg/year.

The zinc cycle is a biogeochemical cycle that transports zinc through the lithosphere, hydrosphere, and biosphere.

== Natural Cycle ==
=== Lithosphere ===
Zinc-containing minerals in the Earth's crust exist primarily as sulfides, such as sphalerite and wurtzite, and carbonates such as smithsonite. Zinc minerals enter the terrestrial environment through weathering and human activities. Zinc is used by plants and other organisms, and then enters aquatic systems where it either settles into sediments or eventually enter the oceans.

=== Oceans ===
Zinc is a marine micronutrient that tends to be in higher concentration in the deep ocean and is transformed into organic zinc which enters the food chain by diatom blooms during upwelling events in the Southern Ocean. Zinc settles to the ocean floor and is returned to the mantle from the subduction of marine sediments.

The zinc cycle has historically been characterized by episodic changes in zinc deposits. Major global events such as the formation or breakup of supercontinents and periods of significant volcanic activity tend to create new deposits of zinc in the lithosphere. In between these events, zinc tends to cycle through the biosphere at a lower rate of change.

== Anthropogenic influences ==
The anthropogenic effect on the zinc cycle has been significant. Zinc is mined as a mineral resource used by humans at a rate of 9800 Gg/yr for use in metal alloys including brass and nickel silver, for galvanizing steel, and in zinc compounds such as zinc oxide. Half of zinc waste from industrial use is from tailings and slag; the rest comes from the oxidation of zinc metals and landfill waste. Scientists estimate that 85% of all zinc that has been mined for human use is still in use; therefore, the amount of zinc waste going into landfills is expected to increase.

Zinc is a trace nutrient present in fertilizers, which contribute to 21 Gg/yr in agricultural cycling. Commercial fertilizers contain as much as 36% zinc. Only a small portion of the zinc that enters the agricultural system is removed in crops that are consumed by humans; a significant portion is recycled in manure and compost, and accumulates in the soil.
