= Arsenic cycle =

The arsenic (As) cycle is the biogeochemical cycle of natural and anthropogenic exchanges of arsenic with the environment. The cycle is of interest because arsenic is detrimental to human health. The World Health Organization recognizes that inorganic arsenic is extremely toxic for humans (U.S. EPA maximum of 10 ppb in water) and detrimental to aquatic life. Arsenic toxicity can harm nearly every organ system within the human body, as well as causing lung and skin cancer. While treatment for arsenic toxicity is possible, prevention or water treatment tends to be the safest solution.

== Reservoirs and fluxes ==
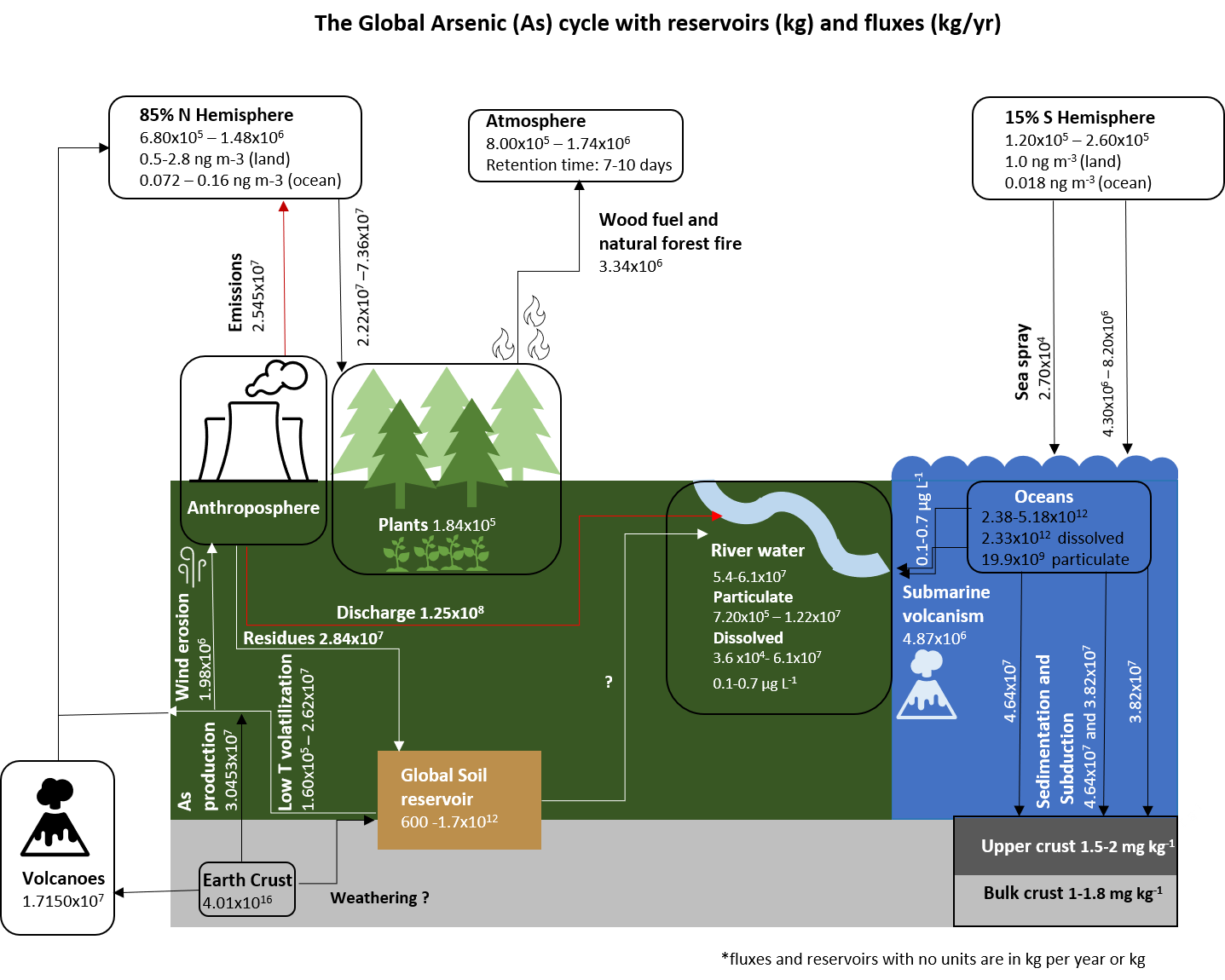
Arsenic biogeochemical cycle with fluxes in kg/yr and reservoirs in kg. Fluxes are depicted with black arrows, while anthropogenic fluxes are red. Fluxes are between the lithosphere, pedosphere, hydrosphere, and atmosphere.

Although many arsenic-containing minerals have been identified, only a few are of economic significance, mainly arsenopyrite (FeAsS) and tennantite. The principal problematic mineral-sourced arsenic comes from smelting of ores that contain traces of arsenic. Sedimentary rocks bearing coal and shale may also contain high As. Major fluxes of As from the lithosphere to the atmosphere are volcanic emissions.

Freshwater and groundwaters commonly contain <1 ppb of As. The concentration of As is pH dependent; acidic conditions mobilize As at pH <5. Oxic seawater contains As(III) as arsenate (average of 1.7 ppb). Major sinks include sedimentation and subduction.

=== Anthropogenic arsenic sources ===
Arsenic is a component of a few man-made materials: wood preservatives, animal feed supplements, and some specialty alloys.

It is also emitted from coal-based power plants and smelting, and refining operations. As is also present in many industrial and agricultural sources such as herbicides, fertilizers, and pesticides. Some As is emitted from steel and glass production, and forest and grassland burning. Major locations that contribute significantly to As pollution are South Asia, West-central Africa, Western Europe, and Latin America.

== Arsenic toxicity ==
The toxicity of As is well known.

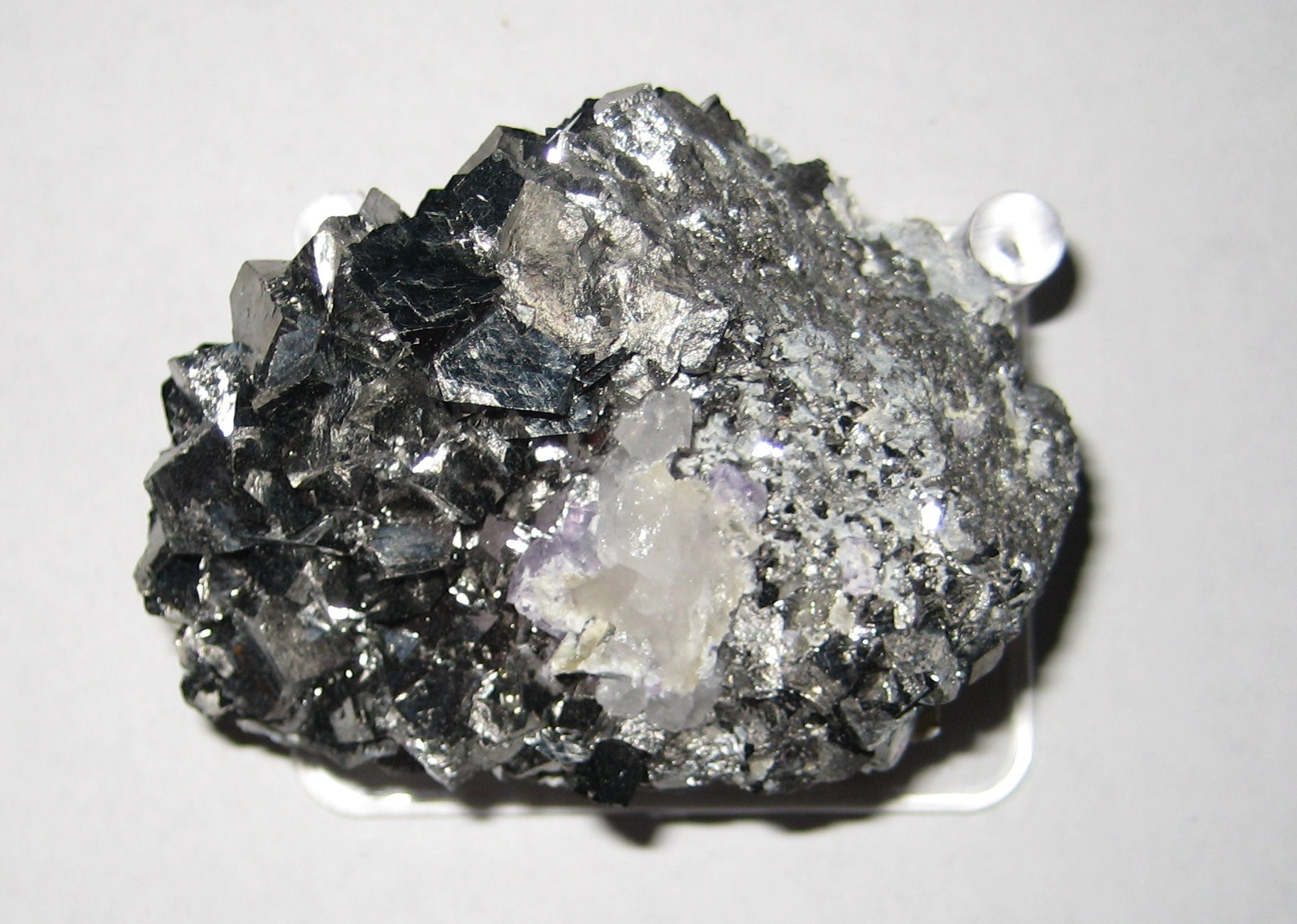
Arsenopyrite (AsFeS) is the most abundant As mineral

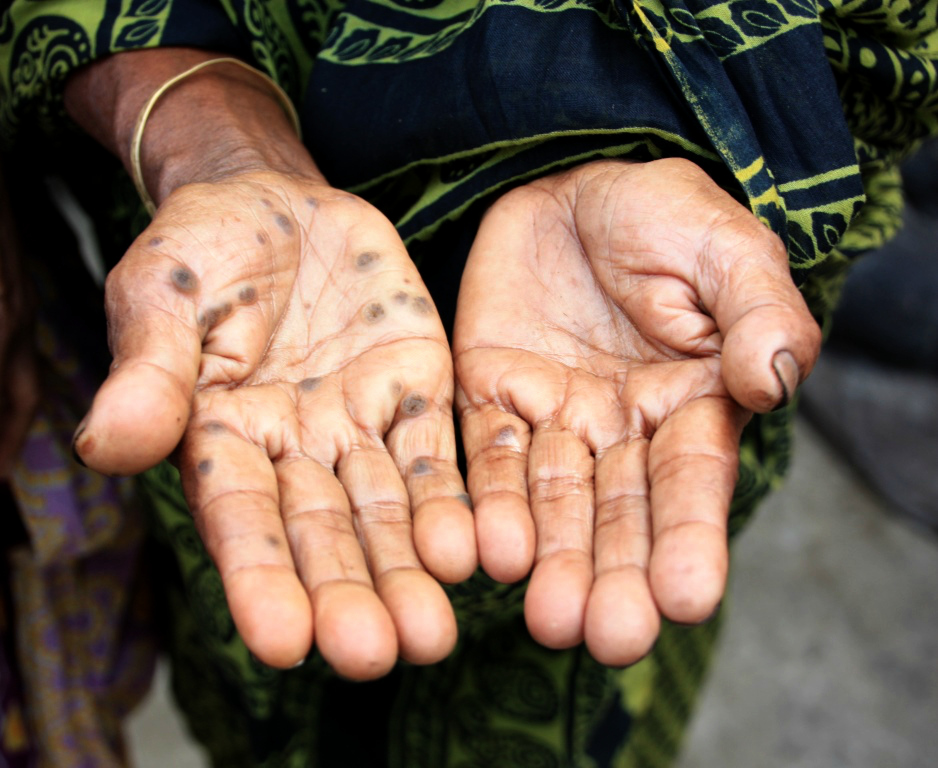
Signs of arsenic poisoning include changes in skin pigmentation. This person experienced As poisoning due to contaminated water.

== See also ==
- Arsenic
- Arsenic poisoning
