= Vanadium cycle =

Exchange of vanadium between continental crust and seawater

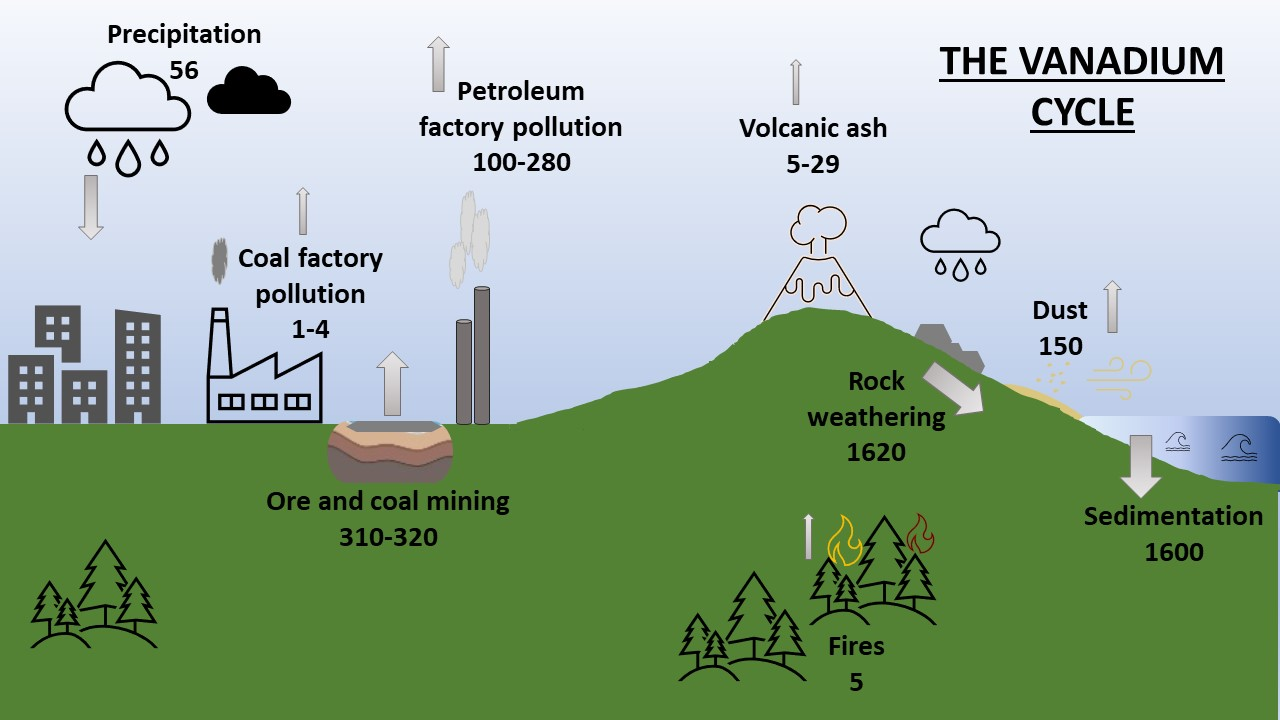
Values are in 10^{9} g/yr. Vanadium is a relatively ample trace metal which enters surfaces through chemical weathering. Vanadium can be released into the atmosphere through volcanic ash, coal and petroleum pollution, or fires. Vanadium enters back into the earth through sedimentation and the cycle begins again. The two largest mechanisms in the vanadium cycle include rock weathering and sedimentation.

The global vanadium cycle is controlled by physical and chemical processes that drive the exchange of vanadium between its two main reservoirs: the upper continental crust and the ocean. Anthropogenic processes such as coal and petroleum production release vanadium to the atmosphere.

== Sources ==
=== Natural sources ===
Vanadium is a trace metal that is relatively abundant in the Earth (~100 part per million in the upper crust). Vanadium is mobilized from minerals through weathering and transported to the ocean. Vanadium can enter the atmosphere through wind erosion and volcanic emissions and will remain there until it is removed by precipitation.

=== Anthropogenic sources ===
Human activity has increased the amount of vanadium emissions to the atmosphere. Vanadium is abundant in fossil fuels because it is incorporated in porphyrins during organic matter degradation. Coal and petroleum factory pollution release significant vanadium to the atmosphere. Vanadium is also mined and using for industrial purposes including for steel reinforcement, electronics, and batteries.

== Sink ==
Vanadium is removed from the ocean by burial marine sediments and incorporation into iron oxides at hydrothermal vents.

== Biological processes ==
Biological processes play a relatively minor role in the global vanadium cycle. Vanadium bromoperoxidase is present in some marine bacteria and algae. Vanadium can also takes the place of molybdenum in alternative nitrogenases.
