= Aluminum cycle =

Biogeochemical cycle

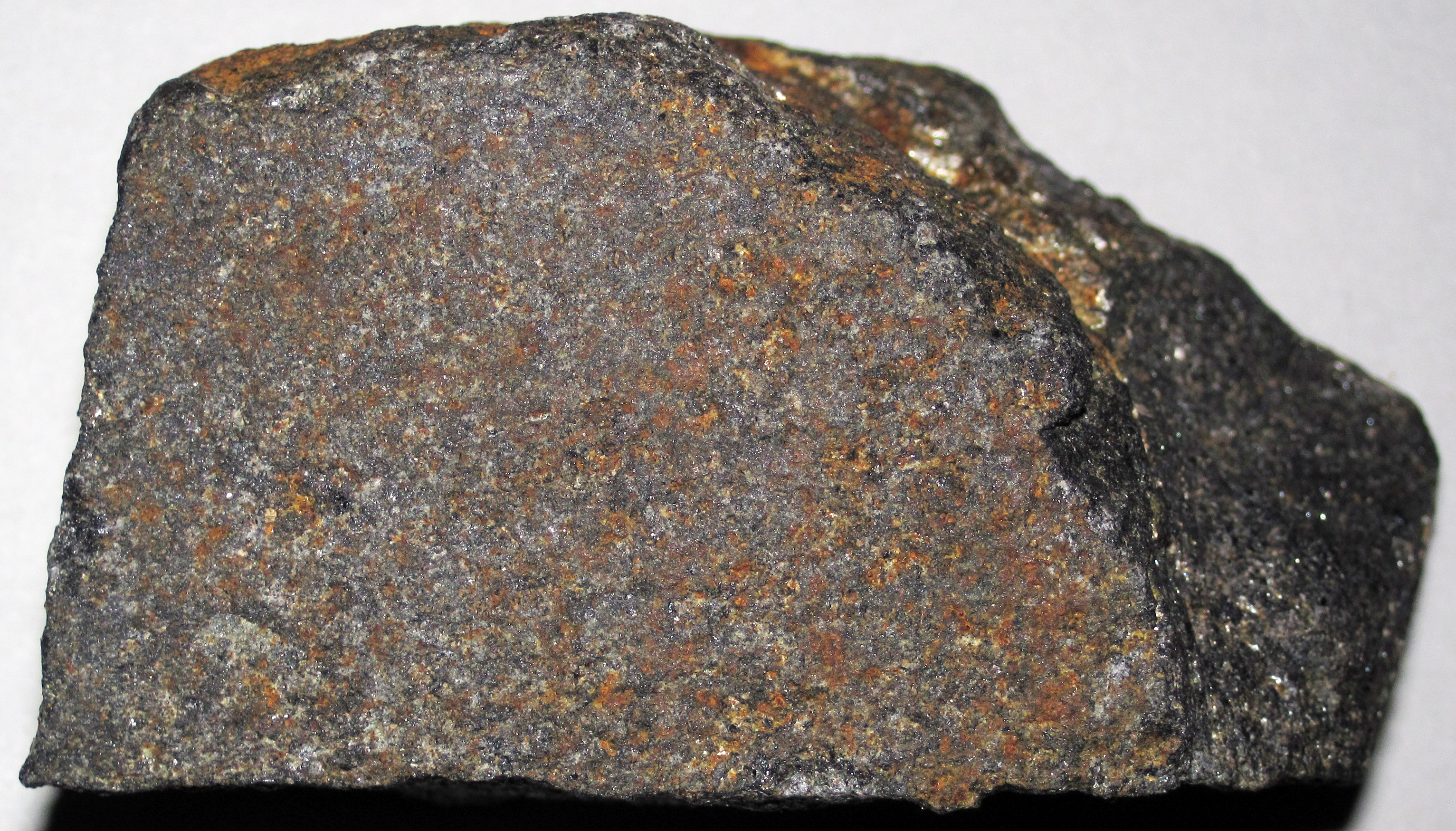
A metamorphic rock called emery that is mostly made of corundum which is an aluminum oxide. This is an example of an aluminum deposit.

Aluminum is the third most abundant element in the lithosphere at 82,000 ppm. It occurs in low levels, 0.9 ppm, in humans. Aluminum is known to be an ecotoxicant and expected to be a health risk to people. Global primary production (GPP) of aluminum was about 52 million tons in 2013 and remains one of the world's most important metals. It is used for infrastructure, vehicles, aviation, energy and more due to its lightweight, ductility, and cheap cost. Aluminum is harvested from gibbsite, boehmite, and diaspore which make up bauxite. The aluminum cycle is the biogeochemical cycle by which aluminum is moved through the environment by natural and anthropogenic processes. The biogeochemical cycle of aluminum is integral with silicon and phosphorus. For example, phosphates store aluminum that has been sedimented and aluminum is found in diatoms (made of silica). Aluminum has been found to prevent growth in organisms by making phosphates less available. The humans/lithosphere ratio (B/L) is very low at 0.000011. This level shows that aluminum is more essential in the lithospheric cycle than in the biotic cycle.

== Natural fluxes ==
=== Lithospheric cycle ===
Aluminum makes up 8% of the Earth’s crust. The majority of aluminum cycling takes place in the lithosphere via sedimentary processes, with 99.999% of aluminum cycled within the lithosphere in the form of primary and secondary minerals as well as colloidal phases. Primary aluminum-rich minerals, such as feldspars, in the Earth's crust are weathered to clay-like materials such as kaolinite. Feldspars are formed when magma cools within Earth’s crust and are weathered away from the parent material. The secondary mineral, kaolinite, forms from carbonic acid weathering. Other secondary minerals include hydroxyaluminosilicates and aluminum hydroxide which are insoluble. They adsorb on mineral and organic surfaces. Clays generally have low solubility and are eventually returned to crust through sedimentation and subduction. Aluminum is then found as an unstable primary mineral. Aluminum goes through several dissolution and precipitation processes when the element is in an aqueous phase, meaning it was dissolved. With further weathering, aluminum is transported as particulates in rivers. Aluminum can also be carried through the atmosphere via dust.

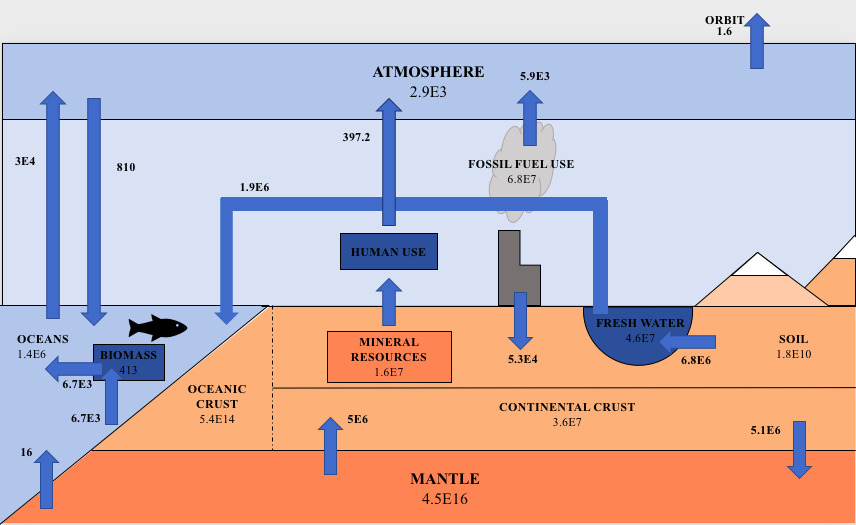
Global aluminum cycle Fluxes are in Gg (gigagrams) Al/yr, and reservoirs are in Gg Al. Most of the aluminum on Earth is located in the mantle and crust of the lithosphere. From various processes, this aluminum is uplifted through the soil and into the biotic cycle. Most notably, humans find mineral deposits of aluminum in the earth and dig it up to use in various products. This process, which includes the production, fabrication, use, and discarding of aluminum, contributes greatly to the cycling of aluminum through our Earth's biogeochemical cycle.

=== Biotic cycle ===
Aluminum enters the biosphere through water and food as soluble aluminum, Al^{3+} or AlF^{2+}. It is then cycled through the food chain. Aluminum has a low abundance in the biosphere but can be found in all organisms. Humans, animals, and plants accumulate aluminum throughout their lives as it cycled throughout the food chain. There is no evidence to support aluminum being essential to humans or in any other forms of life. It causes no harm or good unless over-consumed. The low abundance of aluminum in biology may be due to Al^{3+} being held in the lithosphere and/or organisms have evolved to lose Al^{3+}.

Aluminum can be toxic to plants when the soil is acidic with a pH of 5 or below. Half of the world’s agricultural lands experience this acidity so aluminum is a limiting factor of a crop’s success. Plants can become resistant to Al by methods such as internal detoxification with carboxylate ligands or sequestration of Aluminum complexes.

The Calhoun Experimental Forest where aluminum accumulation in biomass was studied.

In a study on the translocation and transformation of Aluminum in the Calhoun Experimental Forest in South Carolina, an average annual uptake of Al was 2.28 kg/ha/year while the average annual accumulation in biomass off the ground was 0.48 kg/ha/year. Aluminum was found to not leach through the soil so the only method of removal was in the biomass.

== Anthropogenic influence ==
=== Acid rain ===
Human activity has influenced the aluminum cycle through the acidification of the environment. Acid rain increases weathering of the lithosphere through sulfuric acid weathering instead of the usual carbonic acid weathering. This alters the aluminum cycle by reducing the availability of silicic acid and lowering the pH of the environment. The depletion of silicic acid causes the solubility of aluminum to switch from being dependent on relatively stable hydroxyaluminosilicates to much more unstable solubility controls, such as amorphous aluminum hydroxide and organoaluminum complexes. These complexes are more able to move around in the environment which causes an increase in the dissolution of aluminum into the water ways. Aluminum is usually physically weathered and remains in a stable state, acid rain chemically weathers aluminum deposits. This creates a toxic form of aluminum while also increasing the total amount of aluminum being weathered.

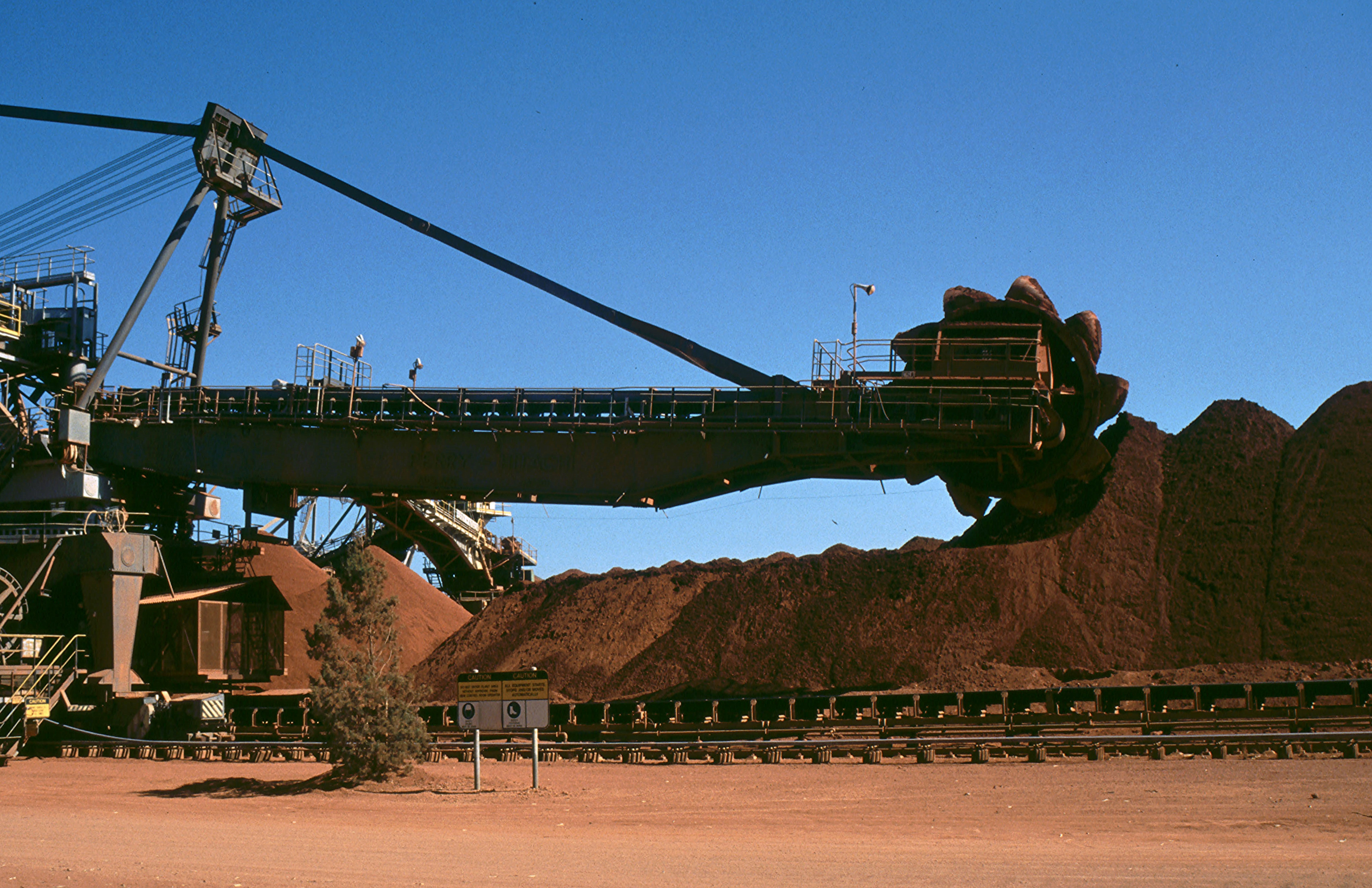
A bauxite mine in Weipa, Australia.

=== Mining and industrial use ===
Mining for aluminum and the subsequent industrial usage disrupts the natural burial processes of the aluminum cycle. By the year 2050 the need for aluminum is expected to increase by 200-300%. Aluminum is mined in the form of bauxite ore. Bauxite is only 40-60% aluminum oxide. The elements that make up the rest of bauxite are also very useful. Globally, 68 million tons of aluminum were mined in 2021. This aluminum is mostly used in vehicle production, construction, and packaging like cans and foil. The two largest bauxite producers are China and Australia. Bauxite is mined with traditional strip mining techniques. This harms the environment by removing top soil, disturbing the ecosystem, and increasing erosion. Aluminum mined from the earth is transported from its original location to all over the world through international trade. It is mainly shipped from the southern hemisphere to the northern hemisphere. This means that most of the environmental impacts from mining are suffered by the southern hemisphere. Aluminum is able to be recycled an infinite number of times.

== Oceanic cycling ==
Aluminum primarily enters oceans by the process of mineral dust deposition. Dust deposition mainly occurs in the Atlantic Ocean, and in the Indian Ocean to a lesser extent, with dust mainly originating from Western Africa and Southern Asia, respectively. From here, some aluminum dust dissolves into the oceans' water columns. Aluminum may also enter or re-enter the cycle from sedimentary sources from oceanic basins.

Recent research suggests that dissolved aluminum is transported by ocean currents through advection. Because of advection, dissolved aluminum is present in a greater area within the ocean's surface. Dissolved aluminum is especially dispersed over the greater Atlantic ocean, first towards Central America and eventually as far as Iceland.

The process of particle scavenging is the main source of dissolved aluminum removal, with dissolved aluminum accumulating on sinking particulates. However, some particulate aluminum is released during sinking, as a result of this scavenging being reversible. The reversibility of this scavenging allows for the distribution of aluminum across depth, with dissolved aluminum becoming more common at greater depths, albeit in lesser concentrations than that of the surface.

Phytoplankton may contribute to the removal of aluminum within the scavenging process. At the ocean's surface, dissolved aluminum is incorporated into phytoplankton, primarily within the cell walls of diatoms. Particulate aluminum—whether adsorbed onto mineral or biotic particulates—eventually sinks to the ocean floor, where it is buried.
