= Carbonates and Evaporites =

- Discipline: Earth Sciences
- Language: English
- Edited by: James W. LaMoreaux

Publication details
- History: 1985-present
- Publisher: Springer (Germany)
- Frequency: Quarterly
- Impact factor: 1.492 (2021)

Standard abbreviations
- ISO 4: Carbonates Evaporites

Indexing
- ISSN: 0891-2556 (print); 1878-5212 (web)

Links
- Journal homepage

Carbonates and Evaporites is an international scientific journal published 4 times a year by Springer and provides a forum for the exchange of concepts, research, and applications on all aspects of carbonate and evaporite geology. This includes the origin and stratigraphy of carbonate and evaporite rocks and issues unique to these rock types: weathering phenomena, notably karst; engineering, environmental issues, mining, mineral extraction, caves, and permeability.

== Editorial Board ==
Editor: J.W. LaMoreaux
