= Charles Elton =

Charles Elton may refer to:

- Charles Elton (lawyer) (1839–1900), English lawyer, politician, writer and antiquarian
- Charles Sutherland Elton (1900–1991), English biologist
- Charles Elton (police), chief of police in Los Angeles, California (1900–1904)
- Charles Abraham Elton (1778–1853), English officer in the British Army and author
- Sir Charles Abraham Grierson Elton, 11th Baronet (born 1953) of the Elton baronets
- Charles Elton (born 1993), New Zealand rugby union player for Otago (National Provincial Championship)
