= Chlorine cycle =

Biogeochemical cycling of chlorine

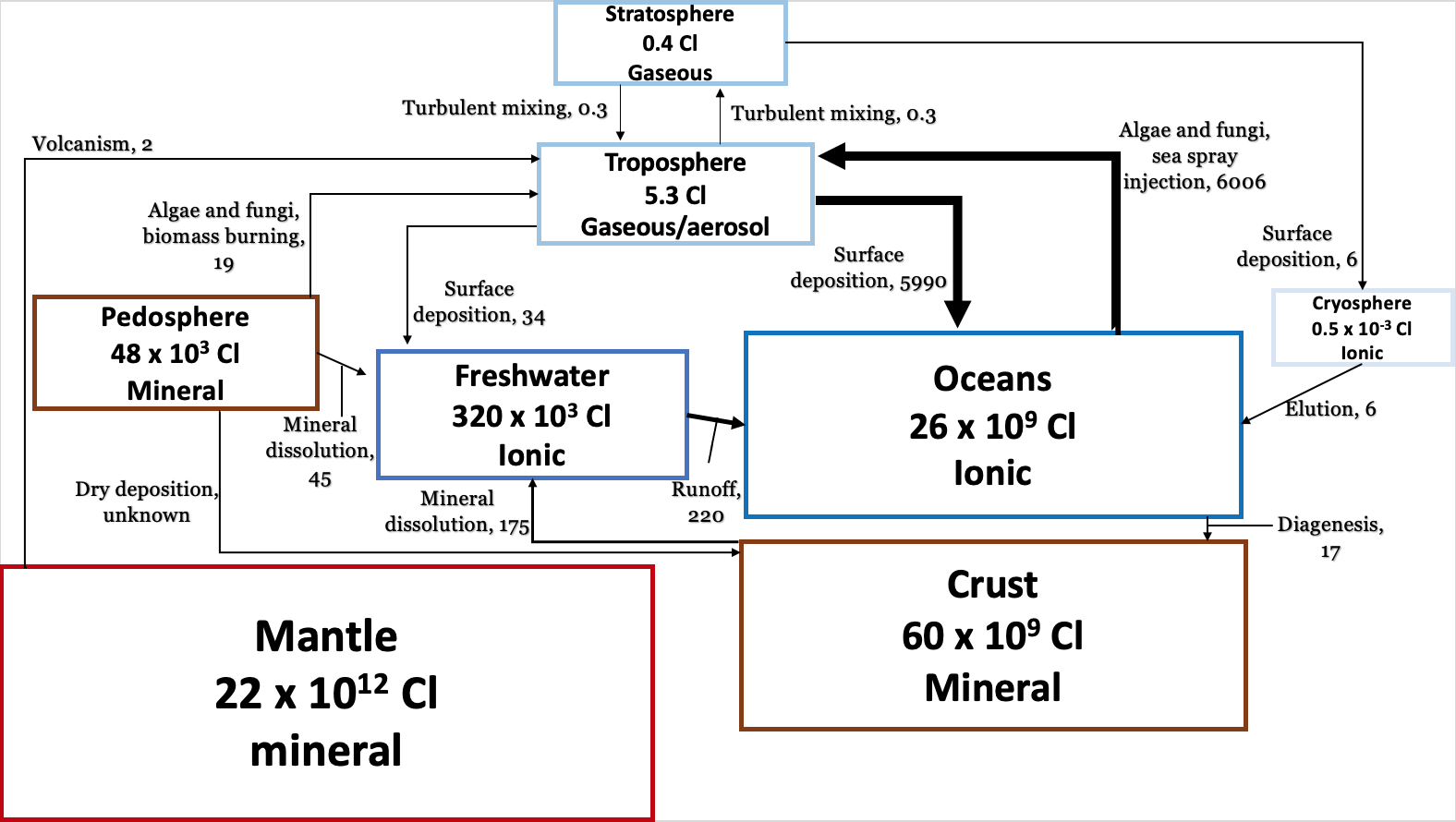
Biogeochemical chlorine cycle: chlorine is cycled through the atmosphere, mantle, crust, pedosphere, cryosphere, and oceans as chloride and organic chlorine. Arrows are labeled in fluxes of chlorine in Tg (teragram) per year. Estimates are also made of natural chlorine contents in Earth's reservoirs and the form they are stored in. The mantle constitutes the largest reservoir of chlorine at 22 × 10^{12} teragrams. Chlorine is cycled through the pedosphere via biotic and abiotic processes that lead to this reservoir acting as a sink.

The chlorine cycle (Cl) is the biogeochemical cycling of chlorine through the atmosphere, hydrosphere, biosphere, and lithosphere. Chlorine is most commonly found as inorganic chloride ions, or a number of chlorinated organic forms. Over 5,000 biologically produced chlorinated organics have been identified.

The cycling of chlorine into the atmosphere and creation of chlorine compounds by anthropogenic sources has major impacts on climate change and depletion of the ozone layer. Chlorine plays essential roles in many biological processes, including numerous roles in the human body. It also acts as an essential co-factor in enzymes involved in plant photosynthesis.

== Troposphere ==
Chlorine plays a large role in atmospheric cycling and climate, including, but not limited to chlorofluorocarbons (CFCs). The major flux of chlorine into the troposphere comes from sea salt aerosol spray. Both organic and inorganic chlorine is transferred into the troposphere from the oceans. Biomass combustion is another source of both organic and inorganic forms of chlorine to the troposphere from the terrestrial reservoir. Typically, organic chlorine forms are highly un-reactive and will be transferred to the stratosphere from the troposphere. The major flux of chlorine from the troposphere is via surface deposition into water systems.

== Hydrosphere ==
Oceans are the largest source of chlorine in the Earth's hydrosphere. In the hydrosphere, chlorine exists primarily as chloride due to the high solubility of the Cl^{−} ion. The majority of chlorine fluxes are within the hydrosphere due to chloride ions' solubility and reactivity within water systems. The cryosphere is able to retain some chlorine deposited by rainfall and snow, but the majority is eluted into oceans.

== Lithosphere ==
The largest reservoir of chlorine resides in the lithosphere, where 2.2×10^{22} kg of global chlorine is found in Earth's mantle. Volcanic eruptions will sporadically release high levels of chlorine as HCl into the troposphere, but the majority of the terrestrial chlorine flux comes from seawater sources mixing with the mantle.

Organically bound chlorine is as abundant as chloride ions in terrestrial soil systems, or the pedosphere. Discovery of multiple Cl-mediating genes in microorganisms and plants indicate that numerous biotic processes use chloride and produce organic chlorinated compounds, as well as many abiotic processes. These chlorinated compounds can then be volatilized or leached out of soils, which makes the overall soil environment a global sink of chlorine. Multiple anaerobic prokaryotes have been found to contain genes and show activity for chlorinated organic volatilization

== Biological processes ==
Chlorine's ability to completely dissociate in water is also why it is an essential electrolyte in many biological processes. Chlorine, along with phosphorus, is the sixth most common element in organic matter. Cells utilize chloride to balance pH and maintain turgor pressure at equilibrium. The high electrical conductivity of Cl^{−} ions are essential for neuron signalling in the brain and regulate many other essential functions in biology

== Anthropogenic chlorinated compounds ==
The depleting effects of chlorofluorocarbons (CFCs) on ozone over Antarctica has been studied extensively since the 1980s. The low reactivity of CFCs allow it to reach the upper stratosphere, where it interacts with UV-C radiation and forms highly reactive chloride ions that interact with methane. These highly reactive chlorine ions will also interact with volatile organic compounds to form other ozone depleting acids.

Chlorine-36 is the radioactive isotope produced in many nuclear facilities as byproduct waste. Its half-life of 3.01×10^{5} years, mobility in the pedosphere, and ability to be taken up by organisms has made it an isotope of high concern among researchers. The high solubility and low reactiveness of ^{36}Cl^{−} is also has made it a useful application for research of biogeochemical cycling of chlorine, as most research uses it as an isotope tracer
