= Hydrosphere =

Liquid water on a planet

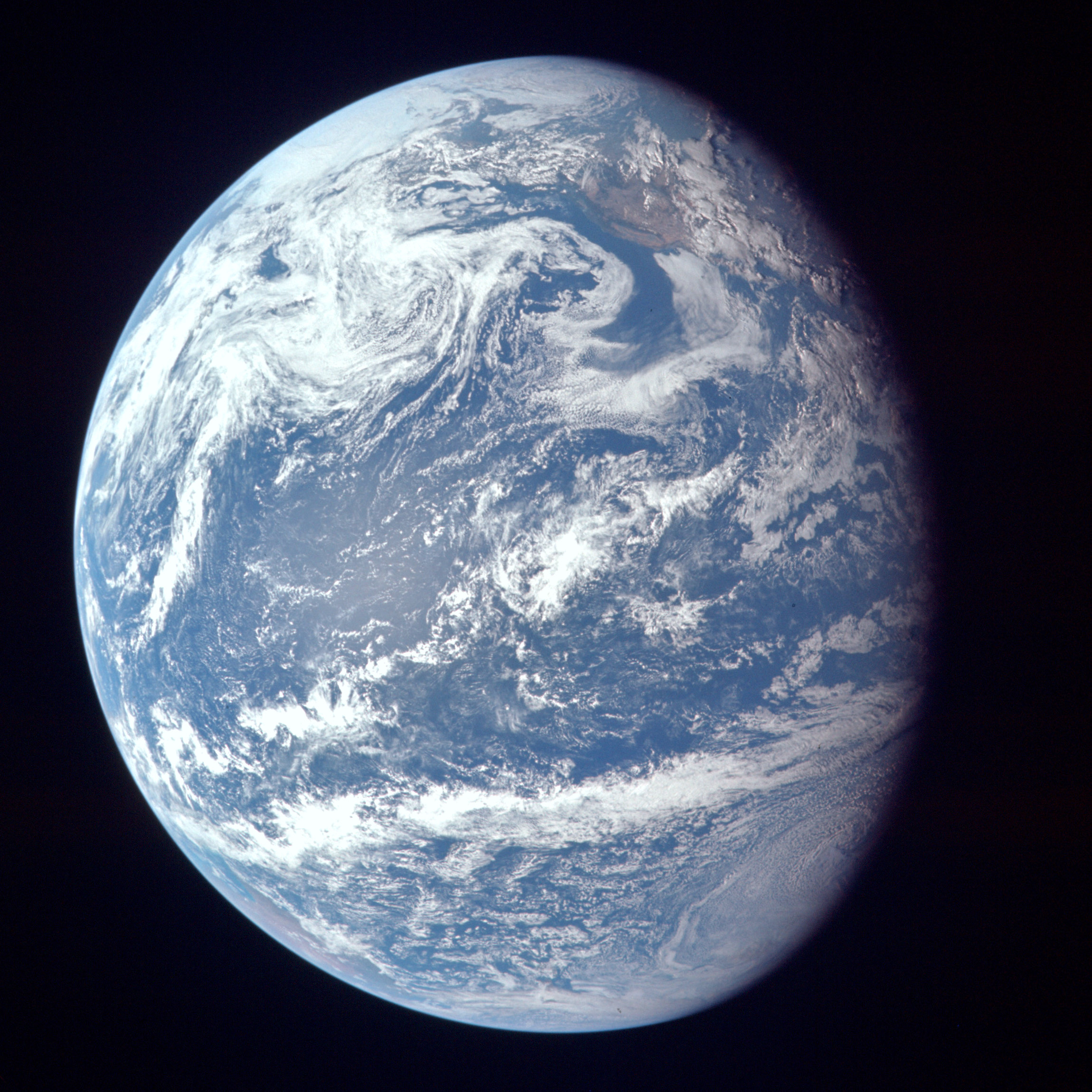
Earth's Pacific Ocean, as captured by the crew of Apollo 11 in 1969

The hydrosphere (from Ancient Greek ὕδωρ (húdōr) 'water' and σφαῖρα (sphaîra) 'sphere') is the combined body of water found on, under, and above the surface of a planet, minor planet, or natural satellite. Although Earth's hydrosphere has been around for about 4 billion years, it continues to change in shape. This is caused by seafloor spreading and continental drift, which rearranges the land and ocean.

It has been estimated that there are 1.386 billion cubic kilometres (333 million cubic miles) of water on Earth. This includes water in gaseous, liquid and frozen forms as soil moisture, groundwater and permafrost in the Earth's crust (to a depth of 2 km); oceans and seas, lakes, rivers and streams, wetlands, glaciers, ice and snow cover on Earth's surface; vapour, droplets and crystals in the air; and part of living plants, animals and unicellular organisms of the biosphere. Saltwater accounts for 97.5% of this amount, whereas fresh water accounts for only 2.5%. Of this fresh water, 68.9% is in the form of ice and permanent snow cover in the Arctic, the Antarctic and mountain glaciers; 30.8% is in the form of fresh groundwater; and only 0.3% of the fresh water on Earth is in easily accessible lakes, reservoirs and river systems.

The total mass of Earth's hydrosphere is about 1.4 × 10^{18} tonnes, which is about 0.023% of Earth's total mass. At any given time, about 2 × 10^{13} tonnes of this is in the form of water vapor in the Earth's atmosphere (for practical purposes, 1 cubic metre of water weighs 1 tonne). Approximately 71% of Earth's surface, an area of some 361 million square kilometres (139.5 million square miles), is covered by ocean. The average salinity of Earth's oceans is about 35 grams of salt per kilogram of sea water (3.5%).

== History ==
According to Merriam Webster, the word hydrosphere was brought into English in 1887, translating the German term hydrosphäre, introduced by Eduard Suess.

== Water cycle ==
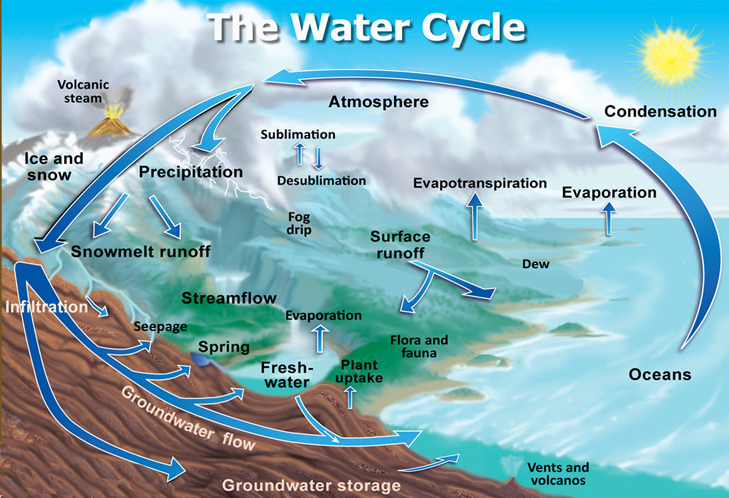

The water cycle refers to the transfer of water from one state or reservoir to another. Reservoirs include atmospheric moisture (snow, rain and clouds), streams, oceans, rivers, lakes, groundwater, subterranean aquifers, polar ice caps and saturated soil. Solar energy, in the form of heat and light (insolation), and gravity cause the transfer from one state to another over periods from hours to thousands of years. Most evaporation comes from the oceans and is returned to the earth as snow or rain.Sublimation refers to evaporation from snow and ice. Transpiration refers to the expiration of water through the minute pores or stomata of trees. Evapotranspiration is the term used by hydrologists in reference to the three processes together, transpiration, sublimation and evaporation.

Marq de Villiers has described the hydrosphere as a closed system in which water exists. The hydrosphere is intricate, complex, interdependent, all-pervading, stable, and "seems purpose-built for regulating life." De Villiers claimed that, "On earth, the total amount of water has almost certainly not changed since geological times: what we had then we still have. Water can be polluted, abused, and misused but it is neither created nor destroyed, it only migrates. There is no evidence that water vapor escapes into space."

Every year the turnover of water on Earth involves 577,000 km^{3} of water. This is water that evaporates from the oceanic surface (502,800 km^{3}) and from land (74,200 km^{3}). The same amount of water falls as atmospheric precipitation, 458,000 km^{3} on the ocean and 119,000 km^{3} on land. The difference between precipitation and evaporation from the land surface (119,000 − 74,200 = 44,800 km^{3}/year) represents the total runoff of the Earth's rivers (42,700 km^{3}/year) and direct groundwater runoff to the ocean (2100 km^{3}/year). These are the principal sources of fresh water to support life necessities and man's economic activities.

Water is a basic necessity of life. Since two thirds of the Earth is covered by water, the Earth is also called the blue planet and the watery planet. (Note: According to the planetary geologist, Ronald Greeley, "Water is very common in the outer solar system." Europa holds more water than earth's oceans.) The hydrosphere plays an important role in the existence of the atmosphere in its present form. Oceans are important in this regard. When the Earth was formed it had only a very thin atmosphere rich in hydrogen and helium similar to the present atmosphere of Mercury. Later the gases hydrogen and helium were expelled from the atmosphere. The gases and water vapor released as the Earth cooled became its present atmosphere. Other gases and water vapor released by volcanoes also entered the atmosphere. As the Earth cooled the water vapor in the atmosphere condensed and fell as rain. The atmosphere cooled further as atmospheric carbon dioxide dissolved into the rain water. In turn, this further caused water vapor to condense and fall as rain. This rain water filled the depressions on the Earth's surface and formed the oceans. It is estimated that this occurred about 4000 million years ago. The first life forms began in the oceans. These organisms did not breathe oxygen. Later, when cyanobacteria evolved, the process of conversion of carbon dioxide into food and oxygen began. As a result, Earth's atmosphere has a distinctly different composition from that of other planets and allowed for life to evolve on Earth.

Human activity has had an impact on the water cycle. Infrastructure, like dams, have a clear, direct impact on the water cycle by blocking and redirecting water pathways. Human caused pollution has changed the biogeochemical cycles of some water systems, and climate change has significantly altered weather patterns. Water withdrawals have exponentially increased because of agriculture, state and domestic use, and infrastructure.

== Recharging reservoirs ==
According to Igor A. Shiklomanov, it takes 2500 years for the complete recharge and replenishment of oceanic waters, 10,000 years for permafrost and ice, 1500 years for deep groundwater and mountainous glaciers, 17 years in lakes, and 16 days in rivers.

== Specific fresh water availability ==
"Specific water availability is the residual (after use) per capita quantity of fresh water." Fresh water resources are unevenly distributed in terms of space and time and can go from floods to water shortages within months in the same area. In 1998, 76% of the total population had a specific water availability of less than 5.0 thousand m^{3} per year per capita. Already by 1998, 35% of the global population suffered "very low or catastrophically low water supplies," and Shiklomanov predicted that the situation would deteriorate in the twenty-first century with "most of the Earth's population living under the conditions of low or catastrophically low water supply" by 2025. Only 2.5% of the water in the hydrosphere is fresh water and only 0.25% of that water is accessible for our use.

== Human impact ==
The activities of modern humans have drastic effects on the hydrosphere. For instance, water diversion, human development, and pollution all affect the hydrosphere and natural processes within. Humans are withdrawing water from aquifers and diverting rivers at an unprecedented rate. The Ogallala Aquifer is used for agriculture in the United States; if the aquifer goes dry, more than $20 billion worth of food and fiber will vanish from the world's markets. The aquifer is being depleted so much faster than it is replenished that, eventually, the aquifer will run dry. Additionally, only one third of rivers are free-flowing due to the extensive use of dams, levees, hydropower, and habitat degradation. Excessive water use has also caused intermittent streams to become more dry, which is dangerous because they are extremely important for water purification and habitat. Other ways humans impact the hydrosphere include eutrophication, acid rain, and ocean acidification. Humans also rely on the health of the hydrosphere. It is used for water supply, navigation, fishing, agriculture, energy, and recreation.

== See also ==
- Aquatic ecosystem
- Biosphere
- Climate system
- Cryosphere
- Lithosphere
- World ocean
- Pedosphere
- Water cycle
- Water vapor § Extraterrestrial
- Extraterrestrial liquid water
- List of largest lakes and seas in the Solar System
- Ocean world
