= Biogeochemistry =

Study of chemical cycles of the earth related to biological activity

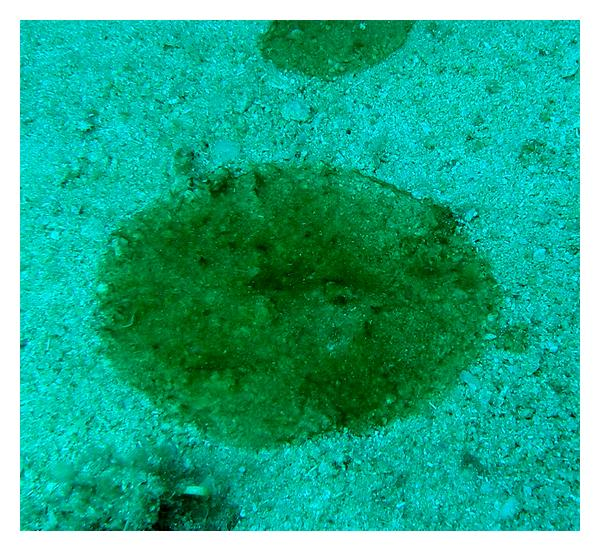
Cyanobacterial mat dominated by Anabaena sp. (heterocystous) in the Mayotte lagoon at 14 m depth. These cyanobacteria fix nitrogen and influence redox conditions, contributing to biogeochemical cycling in marine environments.

Biogeochemistry is the scientific discipline that involves the study of the chemical, physical, geological, and biological processes and reactions that govern the composition of the natural environment (including the biosphere, the cryosphere, the hydrosphere, the pedosphere, the atmosphere, and the lithosphere). In particular, biogeochemistry is the study of biogeochemical cycles, the cycles of chemical elements such as carbon and nitrogen, and their interactions with and incorporation into living things transported through earth scale biological systems in space and time. The field focuses on chemical cycles which are either driven by or influence biological activity. Particular emphasis is placed on the study of carbon, nitrogen, oxygen, sulfur, iron, and phosphorus cycles. Biogeochemistry is a systems science closely related to systems ecology.

== History ==
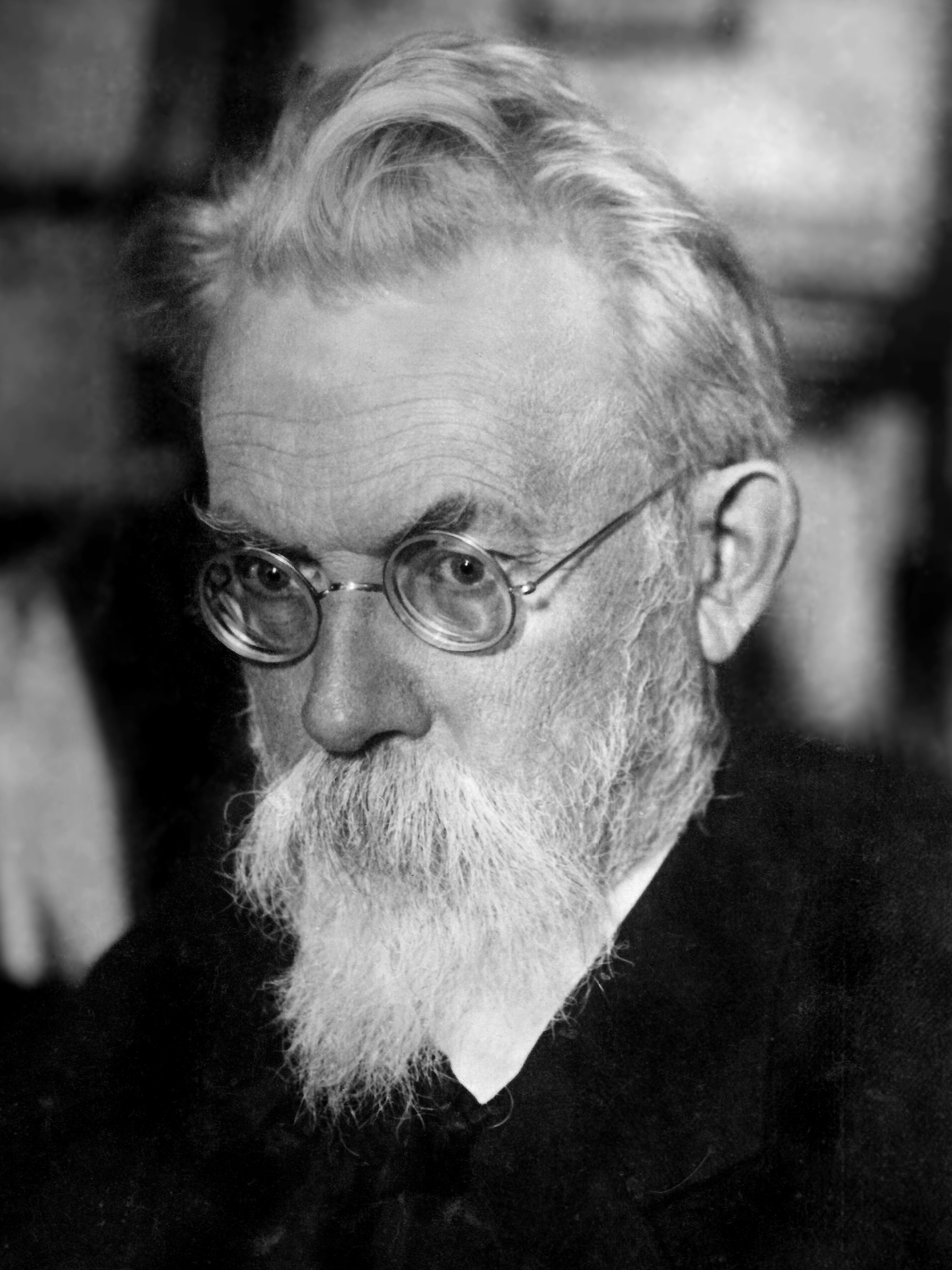
Vladimir Vernadsky, founder of biogeochemistry

=== Early Greek ===
Early Greeks established the core idea of biogeochemistry that nature consists of cycles.

=== 18th-19th centuries ===
Agricultural interest in 18th-century soil chemistry led to better understanding of nutrients and their connection to biochemical processes. This relationship between the cycles of organic life and their chemical products was further expanded upon by Dumas and Boussingault in a 1844 paper that is considered an important milestone in the development of biogeochemistry. Jean-Baptiste Lamarck first used the term biosphere in 1802, and others continued to develop the concept throughout the 19th century. Early climate research by scientists like Charles Lyell, John Tyndall, and Joseph Fourier began to link glaciation, weathering, and climate.

=== 20th century ===
The founder of modern biogeochemistry was Vladimir Vernadsky, a Russian and Ukrainian scientist whose 1926 book The Biosphere, in the tradition of Mendeleev, formulated a physics of the Earth as a living whole. Vernadsky distinguished three spheres, where a sphere was a concept similar to the concept of a phase-space. He observed that each sphere had its own laws of evolution, and that the higher spheres modified and dominated the lower:

1. Abiotic sphere – all the non-living energy and material processes
2. Biosphere – the life processes that live within the abiotic sphere
3. Nöesis or noosphere – the sphere of human cognitive process

Human activities (e.g., agriculture and industry) modify the biosphere and abiotic sphere. In the contemporary environment, the amount of influence humans have on the other two spheres is comparable to a geological force (see Anthropocene).

The American limnologist and geochemist G. Evelyn Hutchinson is credited with outlining the broad scope and principles of this new field. More recently, the basic elements of the discipline of biogeochemistry were restated and popularized by the British scientist and writer, James Lovelock, under the label of the Gaia Hypothesis. Lovelock emphasized a concept that life processes regulate the Earth through feedback mechanisms to keep it habitable. The research of Manfred Schidlowski was concerned with the biochemistry of the Early Earth.

== Biogeochemical cycles ==
Biogeochemical cycles are the pathways by which chemical substances cycle (are turned over or moved through) the biotic and the abiotic compartments of Earth. The biotic compartment is the biosphere and the abiotic compartments are the atmosphere, hydrosphere and lithosphere. There are biogeochemical cycles for chemical elements, such as for calcium, carbon, hydrogen, mercury, nitrogen, oxygen, phosphorus, selenium, iron and sulfur, as well as molecular cycles, such as for water and silica. There are also macroscopic cycles, such as the rock cycle, and human-induced cycles for synthetic compounds such as polychlorinated biphenyls (PCBs). In some cycles there are reservoirs where a substance can remain or be sequestered for a long period of time.

== Research ==
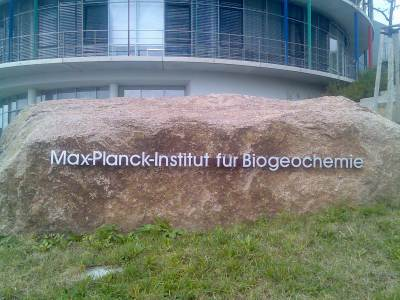
Max-Planck-Institut für Biogeochemie, Jena

Biogeochemistry research groups exist in many universities around the world. Since this is a highly interdisciplinary field, these are situated within a wide range of host disciplines including: atmospheric sciences, biology, ecology, geomicrobiology, environmental chemistry, geology, oceanography and soil science. These are often bracketed into larger disciplines such as earth science and environmental science.

Many researchers investigate the biogeochemical cycles of chemical elements such as carbon, oxygen, nitrogen, phosphorus and sulfur, as well as their stable isotopes. The cycles of trace elements, such as the trace metals and the radionuclides, are also studied. This research has obvious applications in the exploration of ore deposits and oil, and in the remediation of environmental pollution.

Some important research fields for biogeochemistry include:

- modelling of natural systems
- soil and water acidification recovery processes
- eutrophication of surface waters
- carbon sequestration
- environmental remediation
- global change
- climate change
- biogeochemical prospecting for ore deposits
- soil chemistry
- chemical oceanography

== Evolutionary Biogeochemistry ==
Evolutionary biogeochemistry is a branch of modern biogeochemistry that applies the study of biogeochemical cycles to the geologic history of the Earth. This field investigates the origin of biogeochemical cycles and how they have changed throughout the planet's history, specifically in relation to the evolution of life.

== See also ==
- Acid rain
- Atlantic Data Base for Exchange Processes at the Deep Sea Floor
- Carbon sink
- Ecosystem model
- Edaphology
- Environmental engineering science
- Geochemistry
- Geophysiology
- GEOTRACES
- Hydrogen isotope biogeochemistry
- IMBER
- Marine biogeochemical cycles
- Pedology
- Physical impacts of climate change

== Representative books and publications ==
- Vladimir I. Vernadsky, 2007, Essays on Geochemistry and the Biosphere, tr. Olga Barash, Santa Fe, NM, Synergetic Press, ISBN 0-907791-36-0 (originally published in Russian in 1924)
- Oparin, A. J. 1949. Die Entstehung des Lebens auf der Erde. Volk und Wissen Verlag, Berlin, Leipzig.
- Degens, E. T. 1989. Perspectives on Biogeochemistry. Springer, Heidelberg. ISBN 0-387-50191-6
- Ittekkot, V., Kempe, S., Michaelis, W., Spitzy, A. (eds.) 1990. Facets of Modern Biogeochemistry, Festschrift for E. T. Degens. Springer, New York, Berlin Heidelberg. ISBN 0-387-50145-2
- Reitner, J. and Thiel, V. (eds.) 2011. Encyclopedia of Geobiology, Springer, Berling, Heidelberg. ISBN 978-1-4020-9211-4
- Jastrow, R. and Rampino, M. 2008. Origins of Life in the Universe. University Press, Cambridge. ISBN 978-0-521-82576-4
- Schlesinger, W. H. 1997. Biogeochemistry: An Analysis of Global Change, 2nd edition. Academic Press, San Diego, Calif. ISBN 0-12-625155-X.
- Schlesinger, W. H., 2005. Biogeochemistry. Vol. 8 in: Treatise on Geochemistry. Elsevier Science. ISBN 0-08-044642-6
- Vladimir N. Bashkin, 2002, Modern Biogeochemistry. Kluwer, ISBN 1-4020-0992-5.
- Samuel S. Butcher et al. (Eds.), 1992, Global Biogeochemical Cycles. Academic, ISBN 0-12-147685-5.
- Susan M. Libes, 1992, Introduction to Marine Biogeochemistry. Wiley, ISBN 0-471-50946-9.
- Dmitrii Malyuga, 1995, Biogeochemical Methods of Prospecting. Springer, ISBN 978-0-306-10682-8.
- Global Biogeochemical Cycles. A journal published by the American Geophysical Union.
- Cullen, Jay T.; McAlister, Jason (2017). "Chapter 2. Biogeochemistry of Lead. Its Release to the Environment and Chemical Speciation". In Astrid, S.; Helmut, S.; Sigel, R. K. O. (eds.). Lead: Its Effects on Environment and Health. Metal Ions in Life Sciences. Vol. 17. de Gruyter. doi:10.1515/9783110434330-002. PMID 28731295.
- Woolman, T. A., & John, C. Y., 2013, An Analysis of the Use of Predictive Modeling with Business Intelligence Systems for Exploration of Precious Metals Using Biogeochemical Data. International Journal of Business Intelligence Research (IJBIR), 4(2), 39–53.v Archived 2017-12-31 at the Wayback Machine.
- Biogeochemistry. A journal published by Springer.
