= Biogeochemical cycle =

Chemical transfer pathway between Earth's biological and non-biological parts

A biogeochemical cycle is the movement of matter within and between ecosystems

A biogeochemical cycle, or more generally a cycle of matter, is the movement and transformation of chemical elements and compounds between living organisms, the atmosphere, and the Earth's crust. Major biogeochemical cycles include the carbon cycle, the nitrogen cycle and the water cycle. In each cycle, the chemical element or molecule is transformed and cycled by living organisms and through various geological forms and reservoirs, including the atmosphere, the soil and the oceans. It can be thought of as the pathway by which a chemical substance cycles (is turned over or moves through) the biotic compartment and the abiotic compartments of Earth. The biotic compartment is the biosphere and the abiotic compartments are the atmosphere, lithosphere and hydrosphere.

For example, in the carbon cycle, atmospheric carbon dioxide is absorbed by plants through photosynthesis, which converts it into organic compounds that are used by organisms for energy and growth. Carbon is then released back into the atmosphere through respiration and decomposition. Additionally, carbon is stored in fossil fuels and is released into the atmosphere through human activities such as burning fossil fuels. In the nitrogen cycle, atmospheric nitrogen gas is converted by plants into usable forms such as ammonia and nitrates through the process of nitrogen fixation. These compounds can be used by other organisms, and nitrogen is returned to the atmosphere through denitrification and other processes. In the water cycle, the universal solvent water evaporates from land and oceans to form clouds in the atmosphere, and then precipitates back to different parts of the planet. Precipitation can seep into the ground and become part of groundwater systems used by plants and other organisms, or can runoff the surface to form lakes and rivers. Subterranean water can then seep into the ocean along with river discharges, rich with dissolved and particulate organic matter and other nutrients.

There are biogeochemical cycles for many other elements, such as for oxygen, hydrogen, phosphorus, calcium, iron, sulfur, mercury and selenium. There are also cycles for molecules, such as water and silica. In addition there are macroscopic cycles such as the rock cycle, and human-induced cycles for synthetic compounds such as for polychlorinated biphenyls (PCBs). In some cycles there are geological reservoirs where substances can remain or be sequestered for long periods of time.

Biogeochemical cycles involve the interaction of biological, geological, and chemical processes. Biological processes include the influence of microorganisms, which are critical drivers of biogeochemical cycling. Microorganisms have the ability to carry out wide ranges of metabolic processes essential for the cycling of nutrients (macronutrients and micronutrients) and chemicals throughout global ecosystems. Without microorganisms many of these processes would not occur, with significant impact on the functioning of land and ocean ecosystems and the planet's biogeochemical cycles as a whole. Changes to cycles can impact human health. The cycles are interconnected and play important roles regulating climate, supporting the growth of plants, phytoplankton and other organisms, and maintaining the health of ecosystems generally. Human activities such as burning fossil fuels and using large amounts of fertilizer can disrupt cycles, contributing to climate change, pollution, and other environmental problems.

== Overview ==
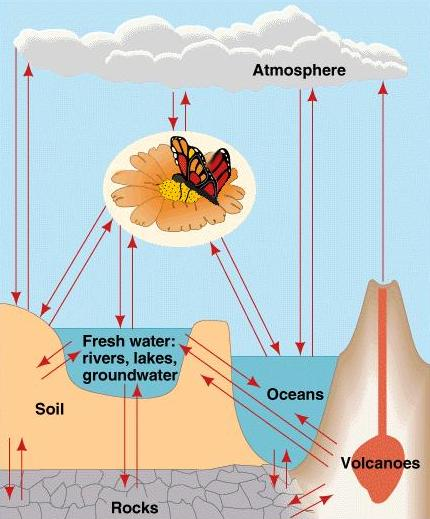
Generalized biogeochemical cycle

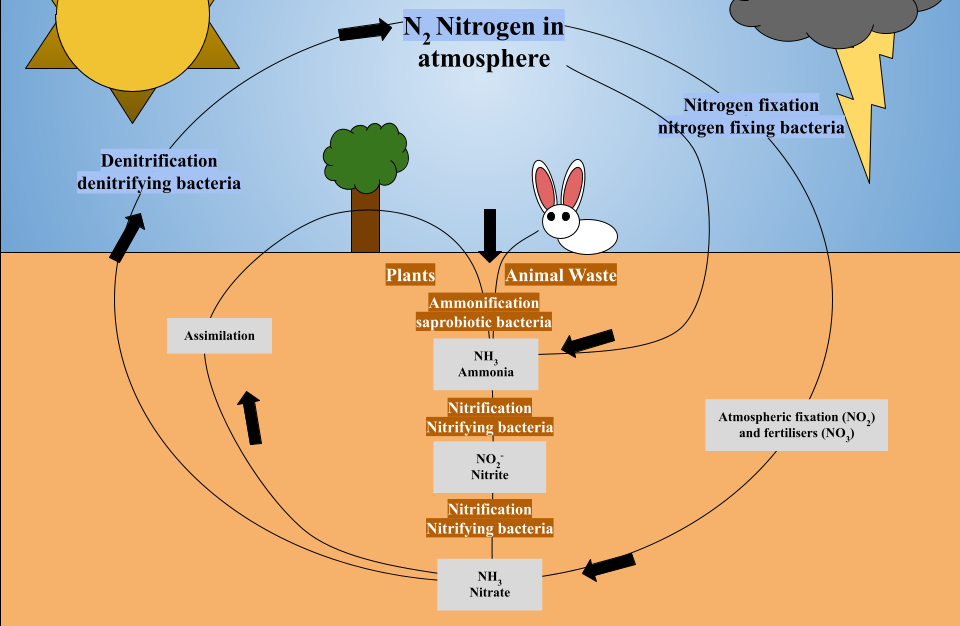
Simplified version of the nitrogen cycle

Energy flows directionally through ecosystems, entering as sunlight (or inorganic molecules for chemoautotrophs) and leaving as heat during the many transfers between trophic levels. However, the matter that makes up living organisms is conserved and recycled. The six most common elements associated with organic molecules — carbon, nitrogen, hydrogen, oxygen, phosphorus, and sulfur — take a variety of chemical forms and may exist for long periods in the atmosphere, on land, in water, or beneath the Earth's surface. Geologic processes, such as weathering, erosion, water drainage, and the subduction of the continental plates, all play a role in this recycling of materials. Because geology and chemistry have major roles in the study of this process, the recycling of inorganic matter between living organisms and their environment is called a biogeochemical cycle.

The six aforementioned elements are used by organisms in a variety of ways. Hydrogen and oxygen are found in water and organic molecules, both of which are essential to life. Carbon is found in all organic molecules, whereas nitrogen is an important component of nucleic acids and proteins. Phosphorus is used to make nucleic acids and the phospholipids that comprise biological membranes. Sulfur is critical to the three-dimensional shape of proteins. The cycling of these elements is interconnected. For example, the movement of water is critical for leaching sulfur and phosphorus into rivers which can then flow into oceans. Minerals cycle through the biosphere between the biotic and abiotic components and from one organism to another.

Ecological systems (ecosystems) have many biogeochemical cycles operating as a part of the system, for example, the water cycle, the carbon cycle, the nitrogen cycle, etc. All chemical elements occurring in organisms are part of biogeochemical cycles. In addition to being a part of living organisms, these chemical elements also cycle through abiotic factors of ecosystems such as water (hydrosphere), land (lithosphere), and/or the air (atmosphere).

The living factors of the planet can be referred to collectively as the biosphere. All the nutrients — such as carbon, nitrogen, oxygen, phosphorus, and sulfur — used in ecosystems by living organisms are a part of a closed system; therefore, these chemicals are recycled instead of being lost and replenished constantly such as in an open system.

The major parts of the biosphere are connected by the flow of chemical elements and compounds in biogeochemical cycles. In many of these cycles, the biota plays an important role. Matter from the Earth's interior is released by volcanoes. The atmosphere exchanges some compounds and elements rapidly with the biota and oceans. Exchanges of materials between rocks, soils, and the oceans are generally slower by comparison.

The flow of energy in an ecosystem is an open system; the Sun constantly gives the planet energy in the form of light while it is eventually used and lost in the form of heat throughout the trophic levels of a food web. Carbon is used to make carbohydrates, fats, and proteins, the major sources of food energy. These compounds are oxidized to release carbon dioxide, which can be captured by plants to make organic compounds. The chemical reaction is powered by the light energy of sunshine.

Sunlight is required to combine carbon with hydrogen and oxygen into an energy source, but ecosystems in the deep sea, where no sunlight can penetrate, obtain energy from sulfur. Hydrogen sulfide near hydrothermal vents can be utilized by organisms such as the giant tube worm. In the sulfur cycle, sulfur can be forever recycled as a source of energy. Energy can be released through the oxidation and reduction of sulfur compounds (e.g., oxidizing elemental sulfur to sulfite and then to sulfate).

Examples of major biogeochemical processes

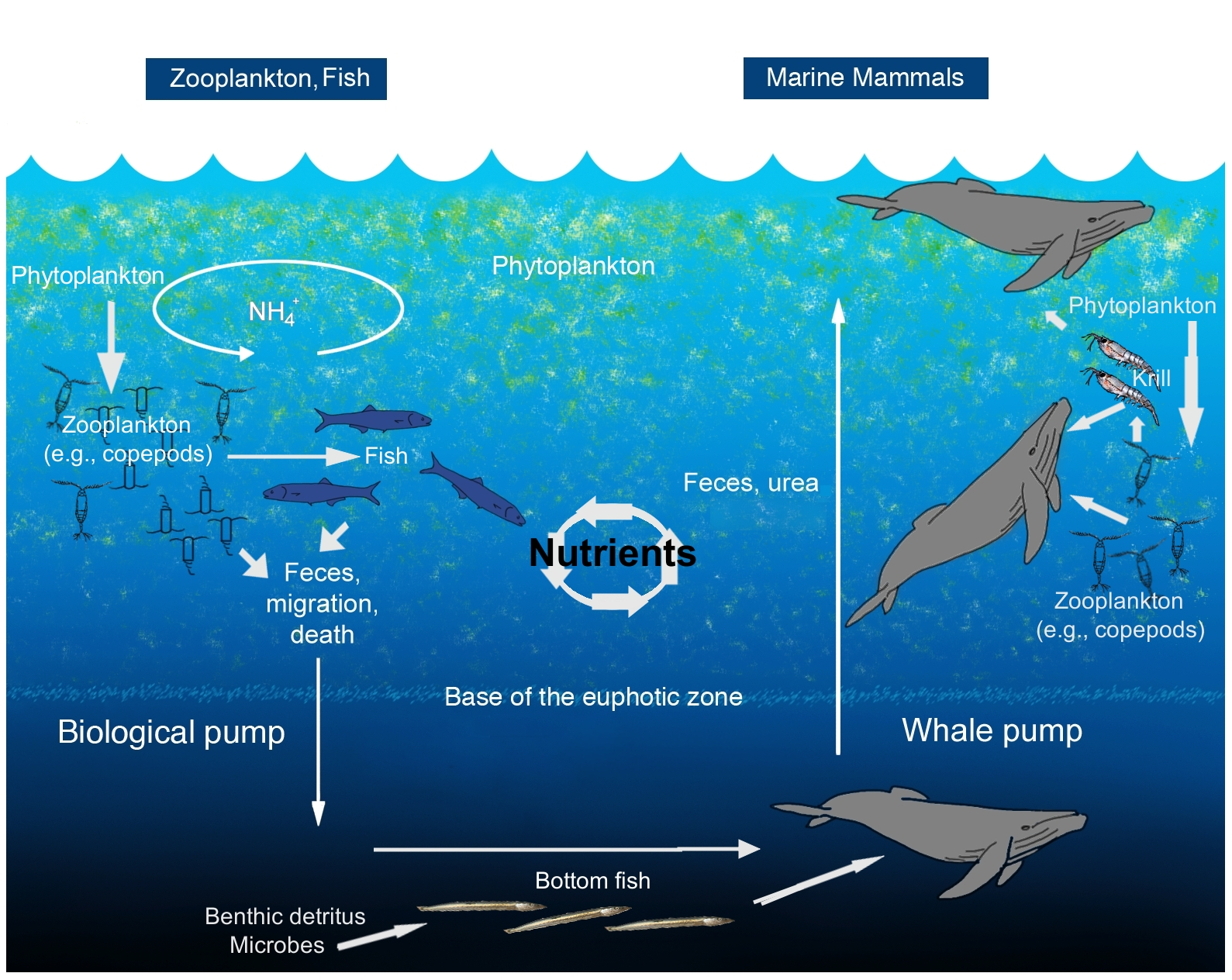
The oceanic whale pump showing how whales cycle nutrients through the ocean water column

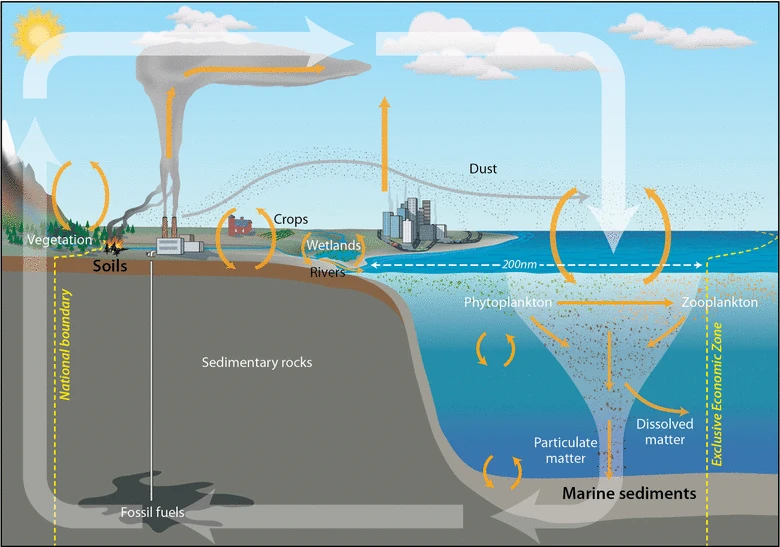
The implications of shifts in the global carbon cycle due to human activity are concerning scientists.

Although the Earth constantly receives energy from the Sun, its chemical composition is essentially fixed, as the additional matter is only occasionally added by meteorites. Because this chemical composition is not replenished like energy, all processes that depend on these chemicals must be recycled. These cycles include both the living biosphere and the nonliving lithosphere, atmosphere, and hydrosphere.

Biogeochemical cycles can be contrasted with geochemical cycles. The latter deals only with crustal and subcrustal reservoirs even though some process from both overlap.

== Compartments ==
Biogeochemical cycles operate by moving substances, which may also undergo chemical rearrangements, through pathways in the biotic compartment and the abiotic compartments of Earth. The biotic compartment is the biosphere and the abiotic compartments are the atmosphere, lithosphere and hydrosphere.

=== Biotic compartment ===
==== Biosphere ====
Microorganisms drive much of the biogeochemical cycling in the earth system.

=== Abiotic compartments ===
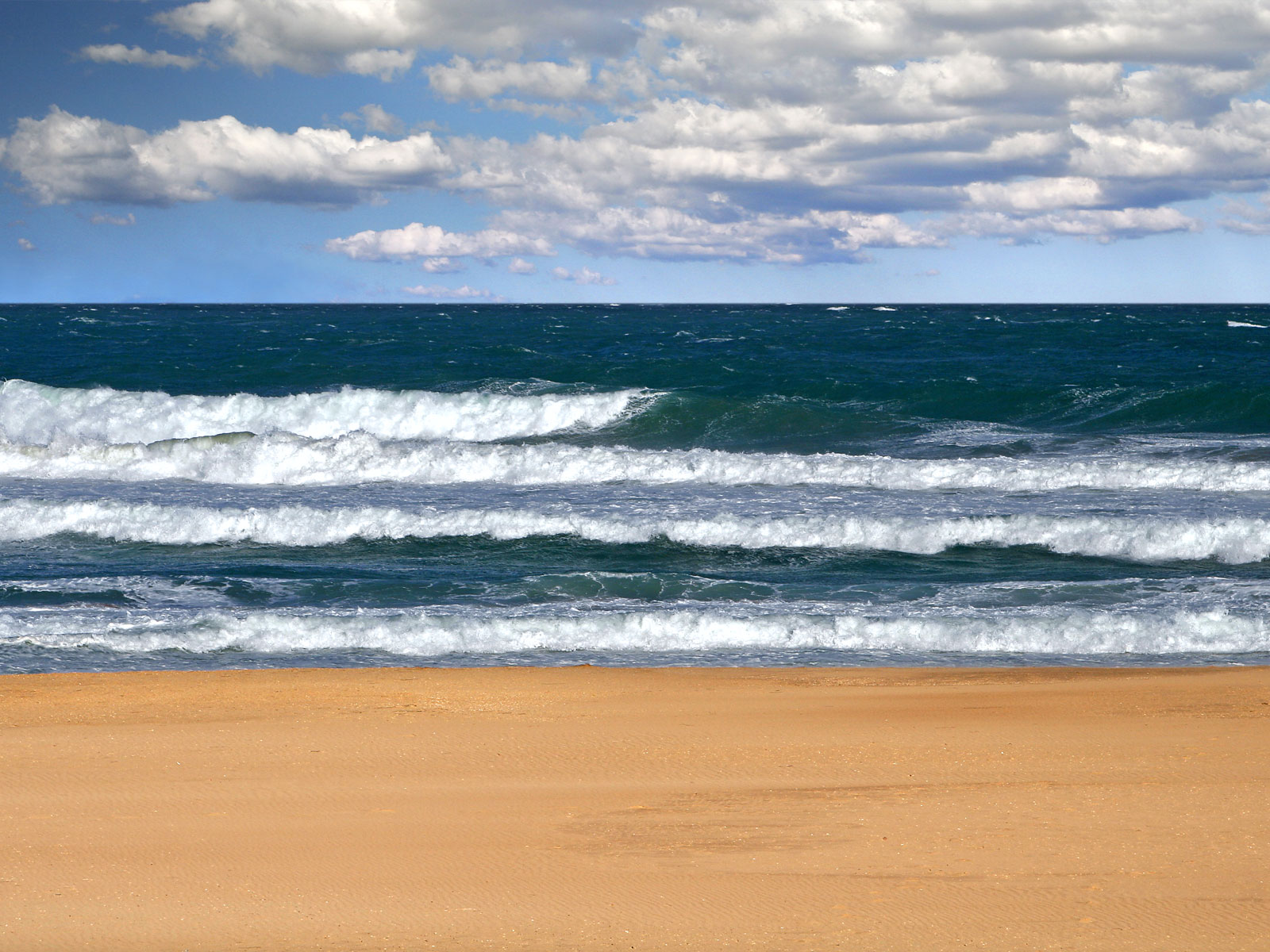
Beach scene simultaneously showing the three abiotic compartments: the atmosphere (air), hydrosphere (ocean) and lithosphere (ground)

==== Hydrosphere ====
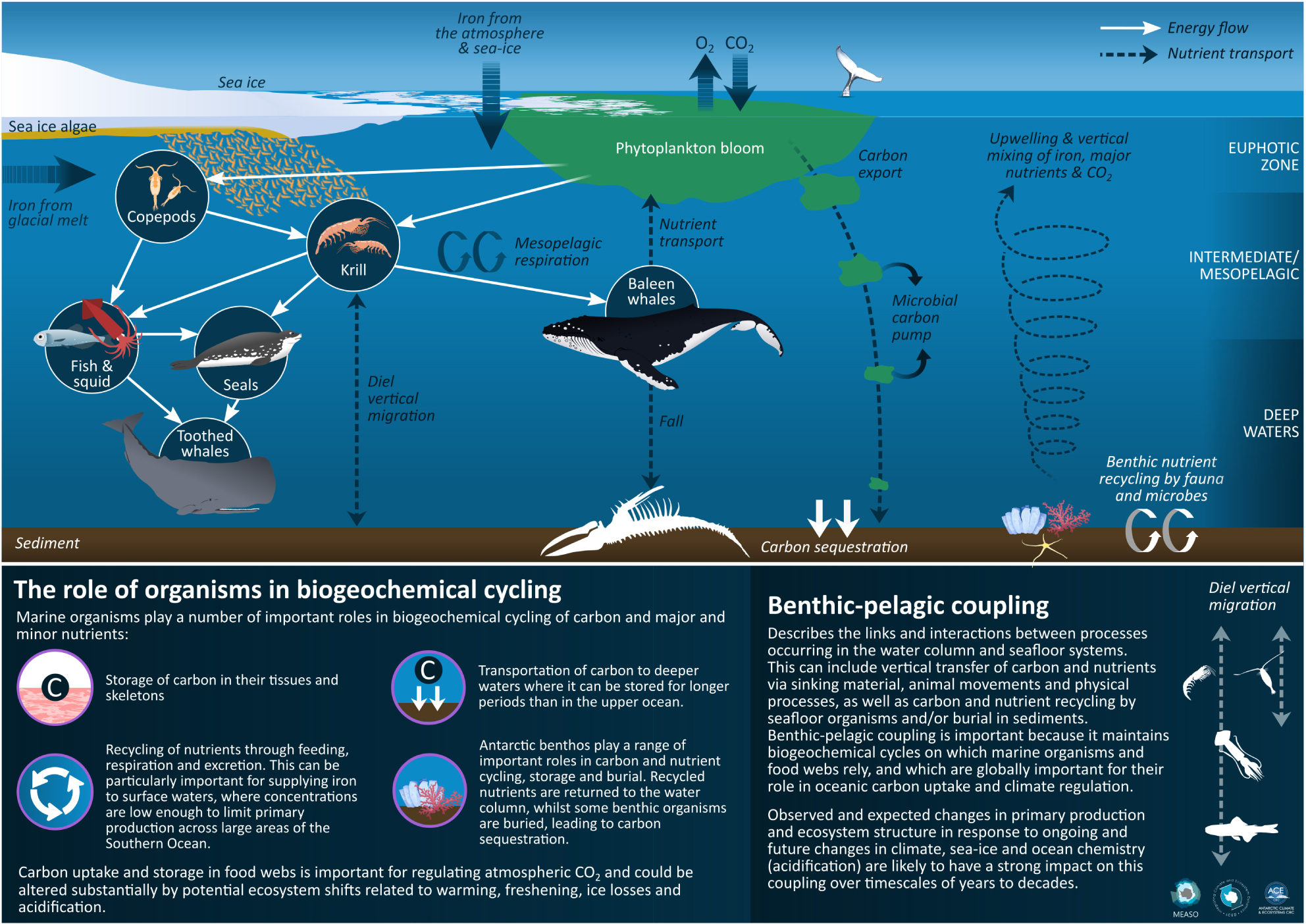
Some roles of marine organisms in biogeochemical cycling in the Southern Ocean

The global ocean covers more than 70% of the Earth's surface and is remarkably heterogeneous. Marine productive areas, and coastal ecosystems comprise a minor fraction of the ocean in terms of surface area, yet have an enormous impact on global biogeochemical cycles carried out by microbial communities, which represent 90% of the ocean's biomass. Work in recent years has largely focused on cycling of carbon and macronutrients such as nitrogen, phosphorus, and silicate: other important elements such as sulfur or trace elements have been less studied, reflecting associated technical and logistical issues. Increasingly, these marine areas, and the taxa that form their ecosystems, are subject to significant anthropogenic pressure, impacting marine life and recycling of energy and nutrients. A key example is that of cultural eutrophication, where agricultural runoff leads to nitrogen and phosphorus enrichment of coastal ecosystems, greatly increasing productivity resulting in algal blooms, deoxygenation of the water column and seabed, and increased greenhouse gas emissions, with direct local and global impacts on nitrogen and carbon cycles. However, the runoff of organic matter from the mainland to coastal ecosystems is just one of a series of pressing threats stressing microbial communities due to global change. Climate change has also resulted in changes in the cryosphere, as glaciers and permafrost melt, resulting in intensified marine stratification, while shifts of the redox-state in different biomes are rapidly reshaping microbial assemblages at an unprecedented rate.

Global change is, therefore, affecting key processes including primary productivity, CO_{2} and N_{2} fixation, organic matter respiration/remineralization, and the sinking and burial deposition of fixed CO_{2}. In addition to this, oceans are experiencing an acidification process, with a change of ~0.1 pH units between the pre-industrial period and today, affecting carbonate/bicarbonate buffer chemistry. In turn, acidification has been reported to impact planktonic communities, principally through effects on calcifying taxa. There is also evidence for shifts in the production of key intermediary volatile products, some of which have marked greenhouse effects (e.g., N_{2}O and CH_{4}, reviewed by Breitburg in 2018, due to the increase in global temperature, ocean stratification and deoxygenation, driving as much as 25 to 50% of nitrogen loss from the ocean to the atmosphere in the so-called oxygen minimum zones or anoxic marine zones, driven by microbial processes. Other products, that are typically toxic for the marine nekton, including reduced sulfur species such as H_{2}S, have a negative impact for marine resources like fisheries and coastal aquaculture. While global change has accelerated, there has been a parallel increase in awareness of the complexity of marine ecosystems, and especially the fundamental role of microbes as drivers of ecosystem functioning.

== Reservoirs ==
The chemicals are sometimes held for long periods of time in one place. This place is called a reservoir, which, for example, includes such things as coal deposits that are storing carbon for a long period of time. When chemicals are held for only short periods of time, they are being held in exchange pools. Examples of exchange pools include plants and animals.

Plants and animals utilize carbon to produce carbohydrates, fats, and proteins, which can then be used to build their internal structures or to obtain energy. Plants and animals temporarily use carbon in their systems and then release it back into the air or surrounding medium. Generally, reservoirs are abiotic factors whereas exchange pools are biotic factors. Carbon is held for a relatively short time in plants and animals in comparison to coal deposits. The amount of time that a chemical is held in one place is called its residence time or turnover time (also called the renewal time or exit age).

== Box models ==
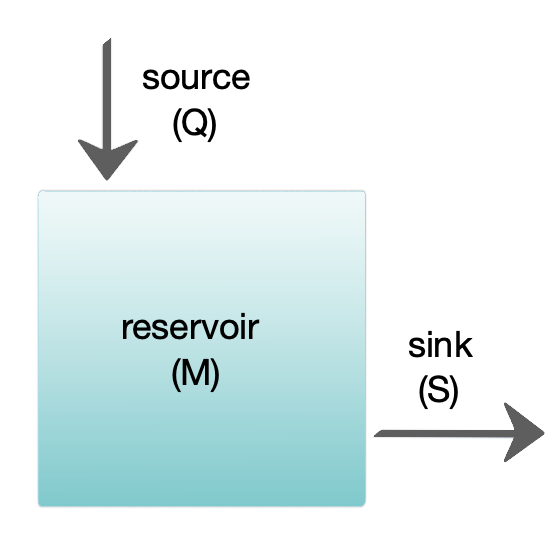
Basic one-box model

Box models are widely used to model biogeochemical systems. Box models are simplified versions of complex systems, reducing them to boxes (or storage reservoirs) for chemical materials, linked by material fluxes (flows). Simple box models have a small number of boxes with properties, such as volume, that do not change with time. The boxes are assumed to behave as if they were mixed homogeneously. These models are often used to derive analytical formulas describing the dynamics and steady-state abundance of the chemical species involved.

The diagram at the right shows a basic one-box model. The reservoir contains the amount of material M under consideration, as defined by chemical, physical or biological properties. The source Q is the flux of material into the reservoir, and the sink S is the flux of material out of the reservoir. The budget is the check and balance of the sources and sinks affecting material turnover in a reservoir. The reservoir is in a steady state if Q = S, that is, if the sources balance the sinks and there is no change over time.

The residence or turnover time is the average time material spends resident in the reservoir. If the reservoir is in a steady state, this is the same as the time it takes to fill or drain the reservoir. Thus, if τ is the turnover time, then τ = M/S. The equation describing the rate of change of content in a reservoir is

$$\frac{dM}{dt} = Q - S = Q - \frac{M}{\tau}.$$

When two or more reservoirs are connected, the material can be regarded as cycling between the reservoirs, and there can be predictable patterns to the cyclic flow. More complex multibox models are usually solved using numerical techniques.

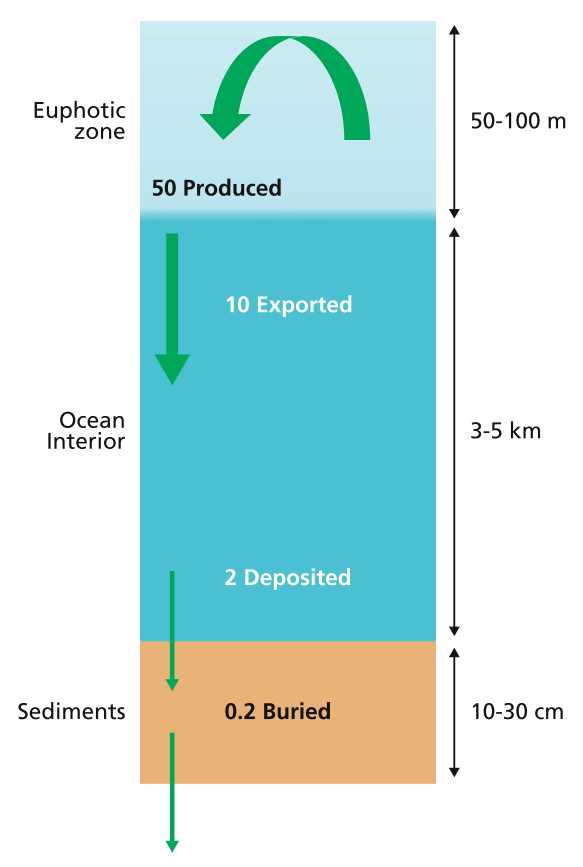
Simple three box model. Simplified budget of ocean carbon flows

Measurement units

Global biogeochemical box models usually measure:

- reservoir masses in petagrams (Pg)
- flow fluxes in petagrams per year (Pg yr^{−1})

The diagram on the left shows a simplified budget of ocean carbon flows. It is composed of three simple interconnected box models, one for the euphotic zone, one for the ocean interior or dark ocean, and one for ocean sediments. In the euphotic zone, net phytoplankton production is about 50 Pg C each year. About 10 Pg is exported to the ocean interior while the other 40 Pg is respired. Organic carbon degradation occurs as particles (marine snow) settle through the ocean interior. Only 2 Pg eventually arrives at the seafloor, while the other 8 Pg is respired in the dark ocean. In sediments, the time scale available for degradation increases by orders of magnitude with the result that 90% of the organic carbon delivered is degraded and only 0.2 Pg C yr^{−1} is eventually buried and transferred from the biosphere to the geosphere.

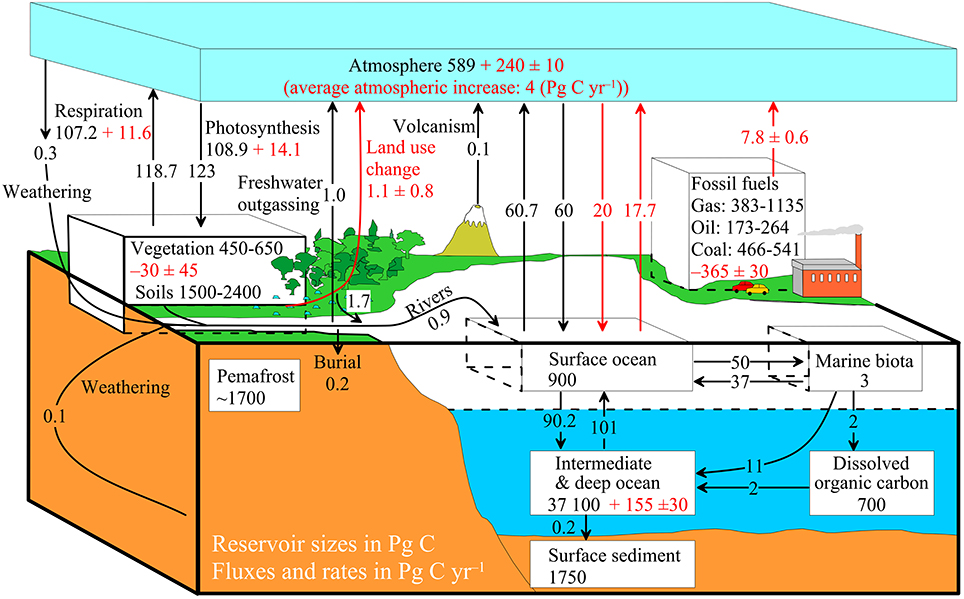
More complex model with many interacting boxes. Export and burial rates of terrestrial organic carbon in the ocean

The diagram on the right shows a more complex model with many interacting boxes. Reservoir masses here represents carbon stocks, measured in Pg C. Carbon exchange fluxes, measured in Pg C yr^{−1}, occur between the atmosphere and its two major sinks, the land and the ocean. The black numbers and arrows indicate the reservoir mass and exchange fluxes estimated for the year 1750, just before the Industrial Revolution. The red arrows (and associated numbers) indicate the annual flux changes due to anthropogenic activities, averaged over the 2000–2009 time period. They represent how the carbon cycle has changed since 1750. Red numbers in the reservoirs represent the cumulative changes in anthropogenic carbon since the start of the Industrial Period, 1750–2011.

== Fast and slow cycles ==
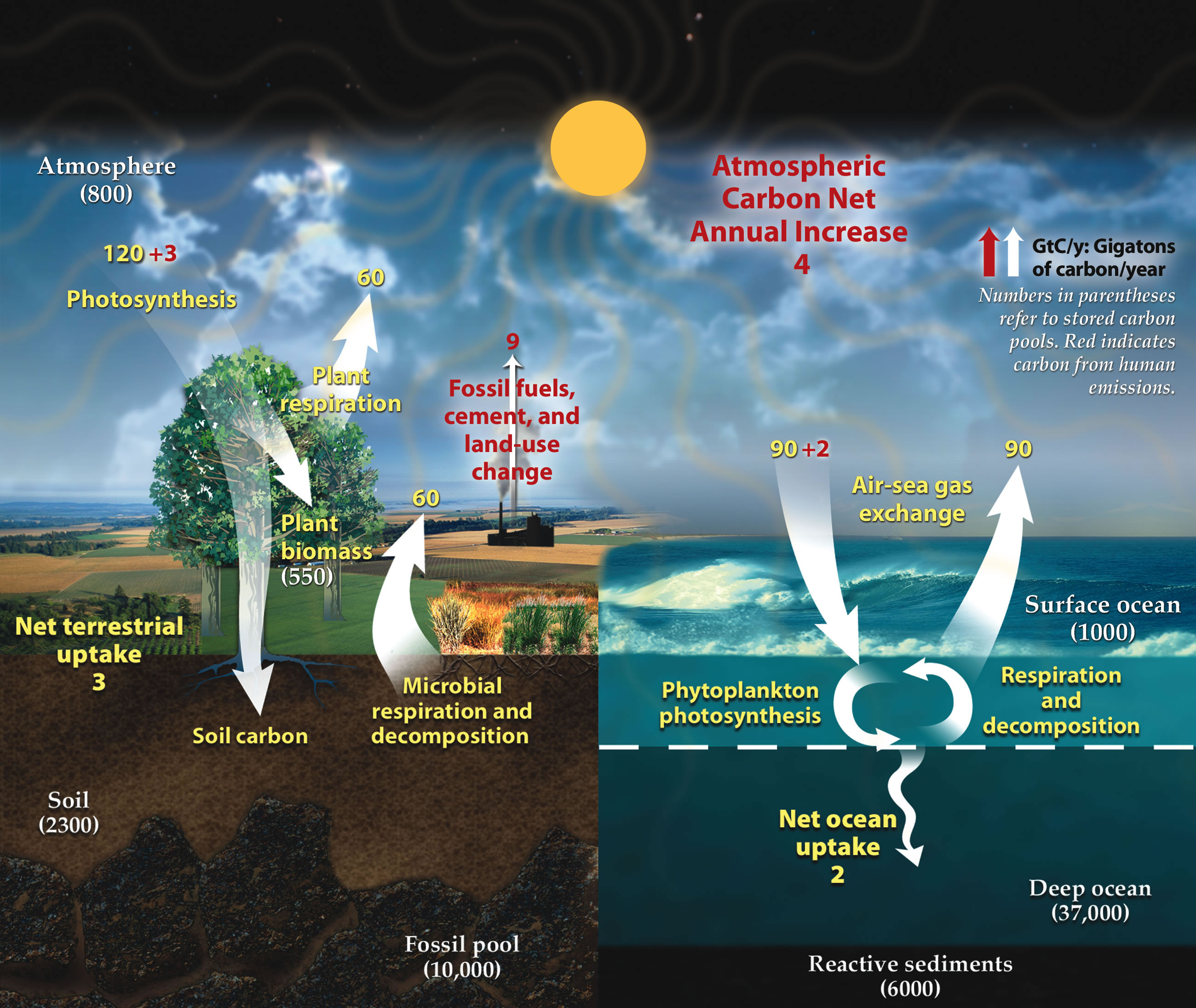
The fast cycle operates through the biosphere, including exchanges between land, atmosphere, and oceans. The yellow numbers are natural fluxes of carbon in billions of tons (gigatons) per year. Red are human contributions and white are stored carbon.

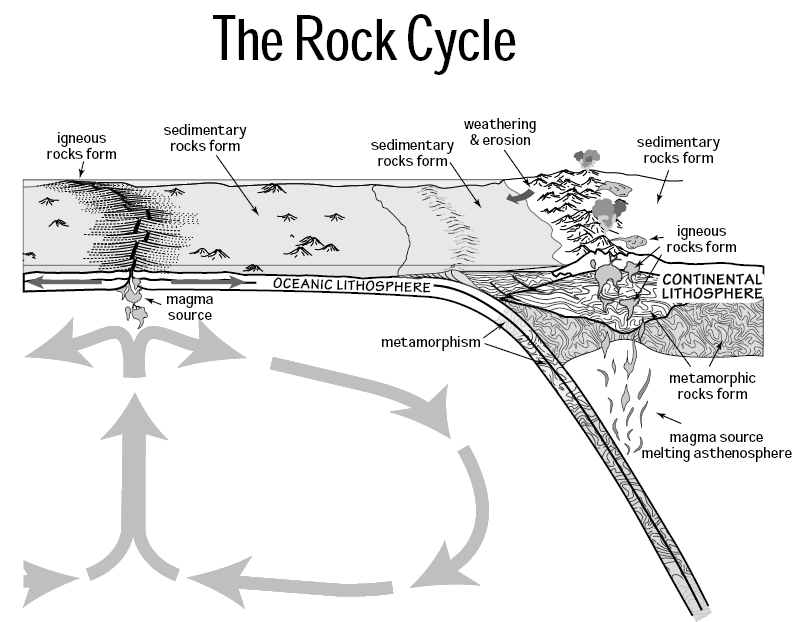
The slow cycle operates in the lithosphere through rocks, including volcanic and tectonic activity.

There are fast and slow biogeochemical cycles. Fast cycle operate in the biosphere and slow cycles operate in the lithosphere in rocks. Fast or biological cycles can complete within years, moving substances from atmosphere to biosphere, then back to the atmosphere. Slow or geological cycles can take millions of years to complete, moving substances through the Earth's crust between rocks, soil, ocean and atmosphere.

As an example, the fast carbon cycle is illustrated in the diagram on the right. This cycle involves relatively short-term biogeochemical processes between the environment and living organisms in the biosphere. It includes movements of carbon between the atmosphere and terrestrial and marine ecosystems, as well as soils and seafloor sediments. The fast cycle includes annual cycles involving photosynthesis and decadal cycles involving vegetative growth and decomposition. The reactions of the fast carbon cycle to human activities will determine many of the more immediate impacts of climate change.

The slow cycle is illustrated in the other diagram. It involves medium to long-term geochemical processes belonging to the rock cycle. The exchange between the ocean and atmosphere can take centuries, and the weathering of rocks can take millions of years. Carbon in the ocean precipitates to the ocean floor where it can form sedimentary rock and be subducted into the Earth's mantle. Mountain building processes result in the return of this geologic carbon to the Earth's surface. There the rocks are weathered and carbon is returned to the atmosphere by degassing and to the ocean by rivers. Other geologic carbon returns to the ocean through the hydrothermal emission of calcium ions. In a given year between 10 and 100 million tonnes of carbon moves around this slow cycle. This includes volcanoes returning geologic carbon directly to the atmosphere in the form of carbon dioxide. However, this is less than one percent of the carbon dioxide put into the atmosphere by burning fossil fuels.

== Deep cycles ==
The terrestrial subsurface is the largest reservoir of carbon on earth, containing 14–135 Pg of carbon and 2–19% of all biomass. Microorganisms drive organic and inorganic compound transformations in this environment and thereby control biogeochemical cycles. Current knowledge of the microbial ecology of the subsurface is primarily based on 16S ribosomal RNA (rRNA) gene sequences. Recent estimates show that <8% of 16S rRNA sequences in public databases derive from subsurface organisms and only a small fraction of those are represented by genomes or isolates. Thus, there is remarkably little reliable information about microbial metabolism in the subsurface. Further, little is known about how organisms in subsurface ecosystems are metabolically interconnected. Some cultivation-based studies of syntrophic consortia and small-scale metagenomic analyses of natural communities suggest that organisms are linked via metabolic handoffs: the transfer of redox reaction products of one organism to another. However, no complex environments have been dissected completely enough to resolve the metabolic interaction networks that underpin them. This restricts the ability of biogeochemical models to capture key aspects of the carbon and other nutrient cycles. New approaches such as genome-resolved metagenomics, an approach that can yield a comprehensive set of draft and even complete genomes for organisms without the requirement for laboratory isolation have the potential to provide this critical level of understanding of biogeochemical processes.

== Some examples ==
Some of the more well-known biogeochemical cycles are shown below:

Carbon cycle

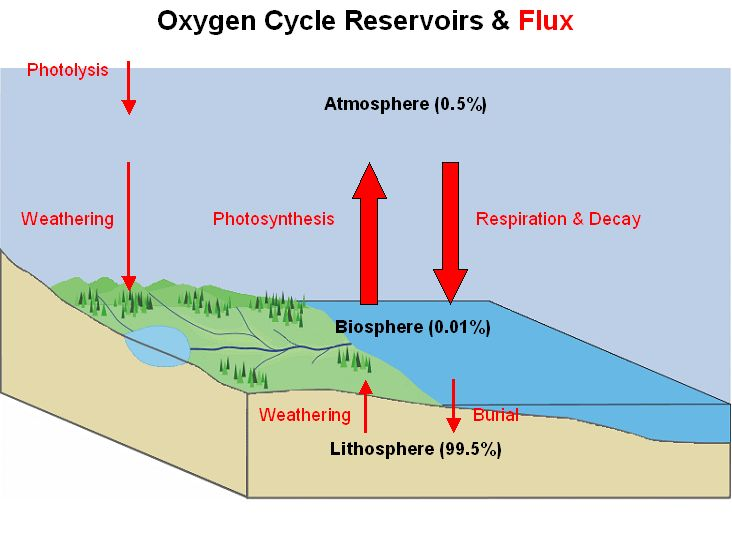
Oxygen cycle

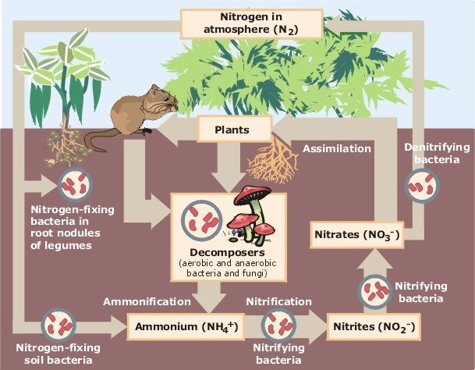
Nitrogen cycle

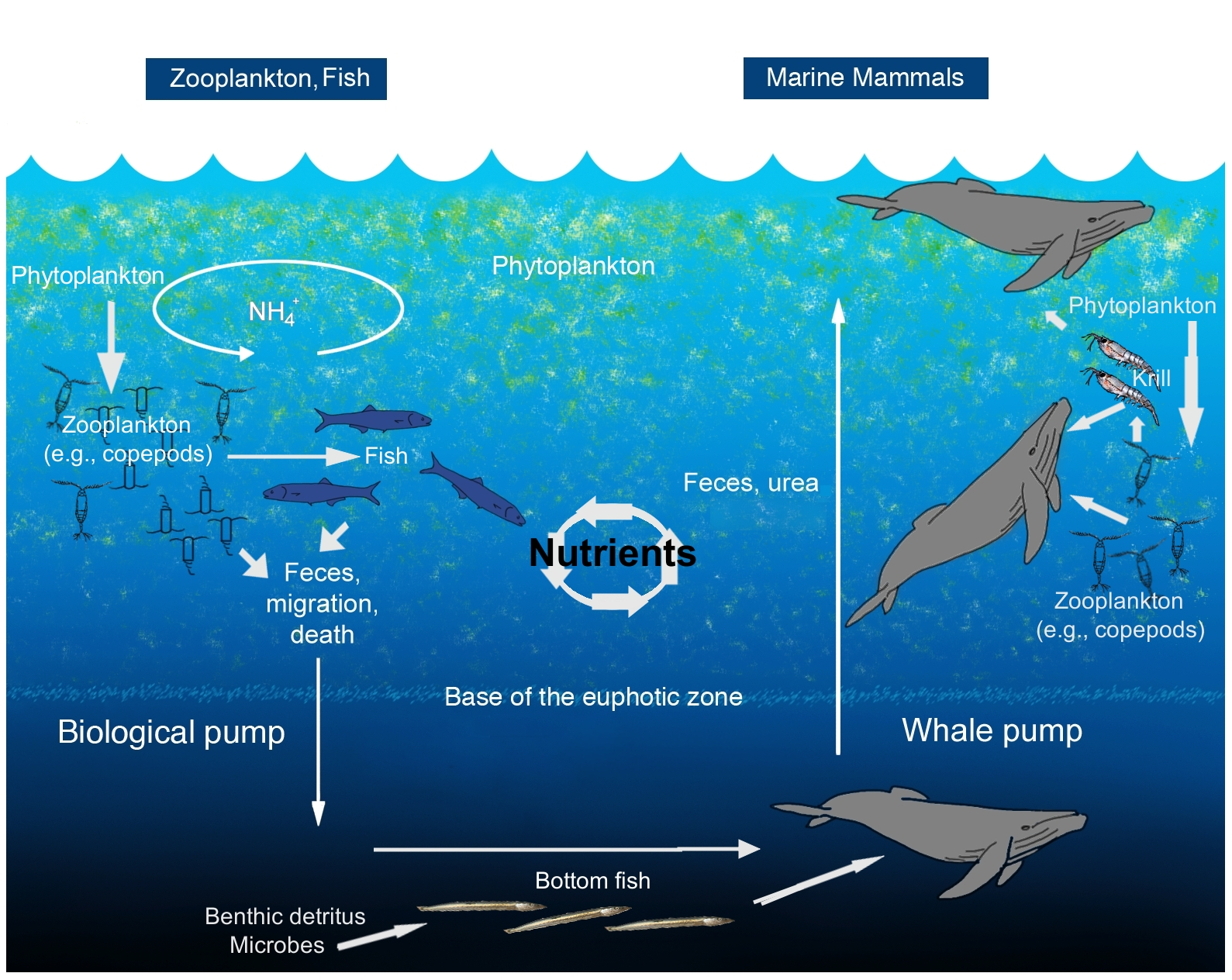
Nutrient cycle

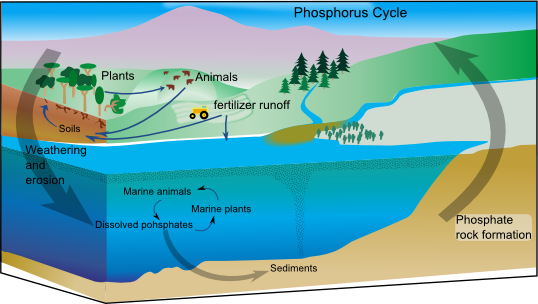
Phosphorus cycle

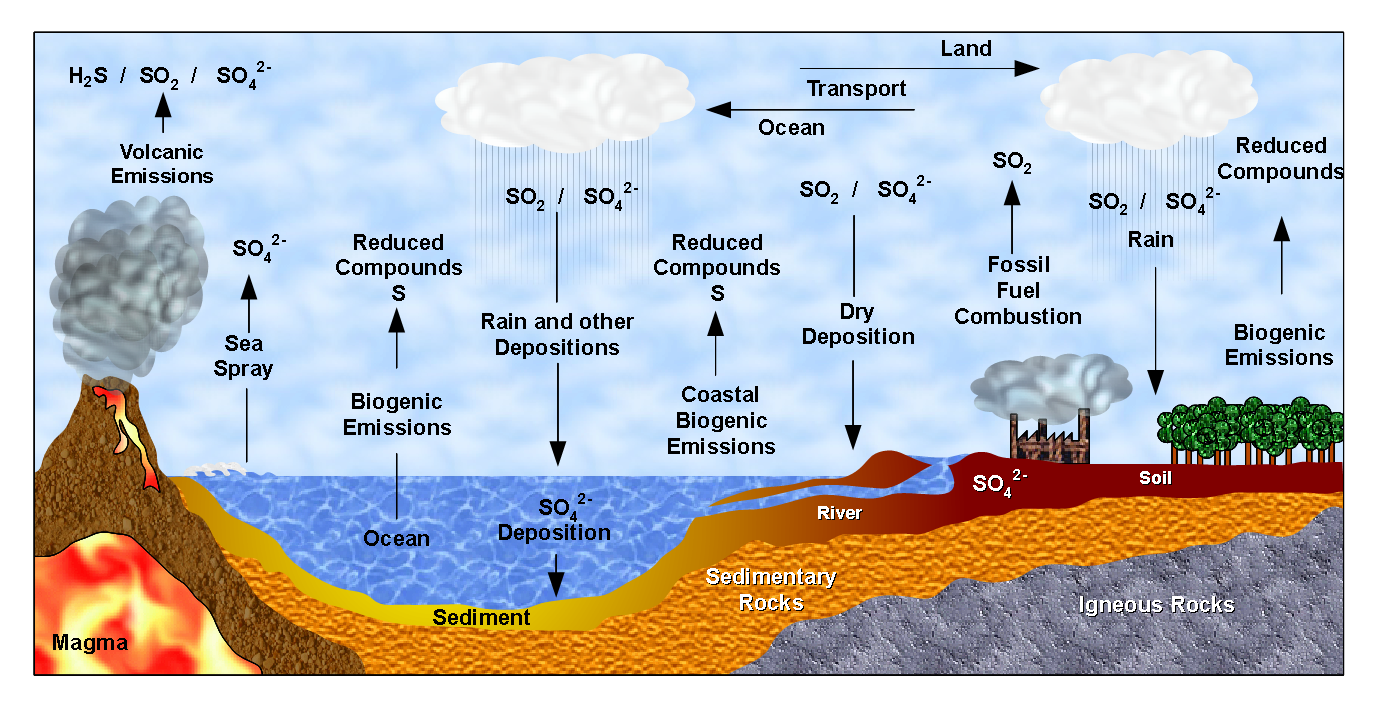
Sulfur cycle

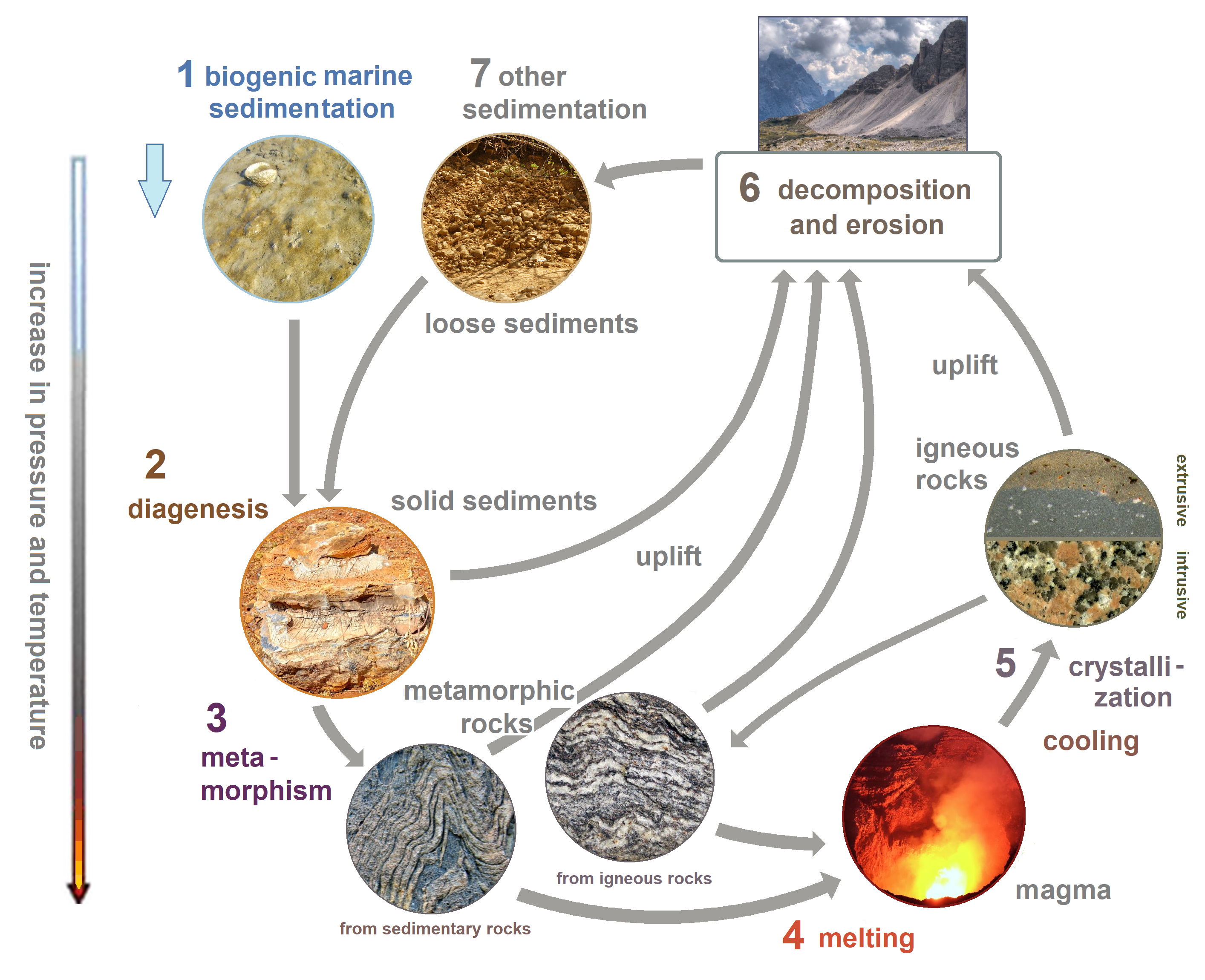
Rock cycle

Water cycle

Many biogeochemical cycles are currently being studied for the first time. Climate change and human impacts are drastically changing the speed, intensity, and balance of these relatively unknown cycles, which include:

- the mercury cycle, and
- the human-caused cycle of PCBs.
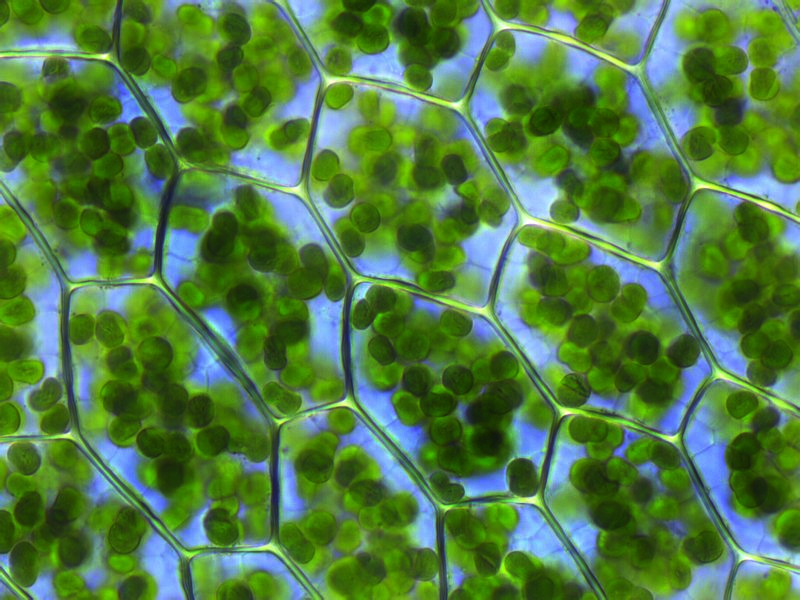
Chloroplasts conduct photosynthesis in plant cells and other eukaryotic organisms.

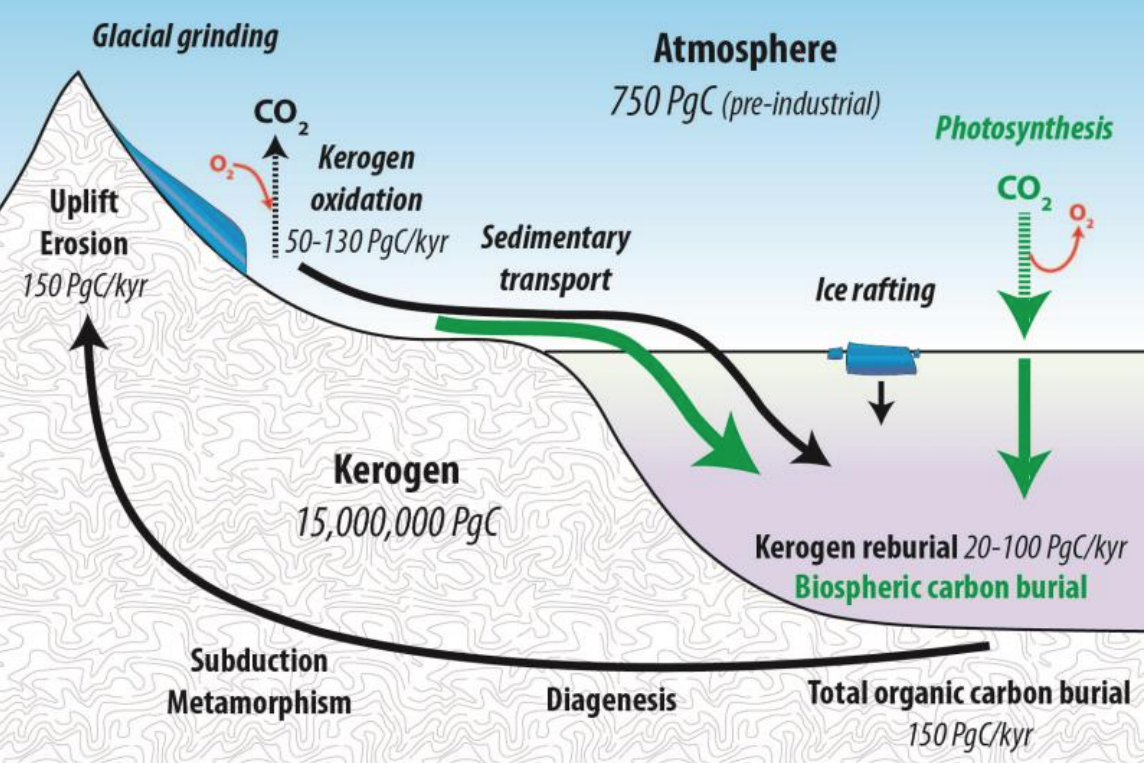
Kerogen cycle

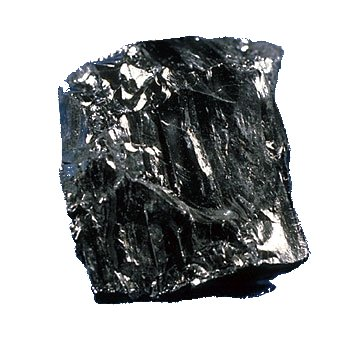
Coal is a reservoir of carbon.

Biogeochemical cycles always involve active equilibrium states: a balance in the cycling of the element between compartments. However, overall balance may involve compartments distributed on a global scale.

As biogeochemical cycles describe the movements of substances on the entire globe, the study of these is inherently multidisciplinary. The carbon cycle may be related to research in ecology and atmospheric sciences. Biochemical dynamics would also be related to the fields of geology and pedology.

== See also ==
- Carbonate–silicate cycle – Geochemical transformation of silicate rocks
- Ecological recycling – Set of processes exchanging nutrients between parts of a system
- Great Acceleration – Proposed geologic epoch
- Hydrogen cycle – Hydrogen exchange between the living and non-living world
- Redox gradient – Variation of the redox potential with distance (or depth)
