= Mercury cycle =

Biogeochemical cycle

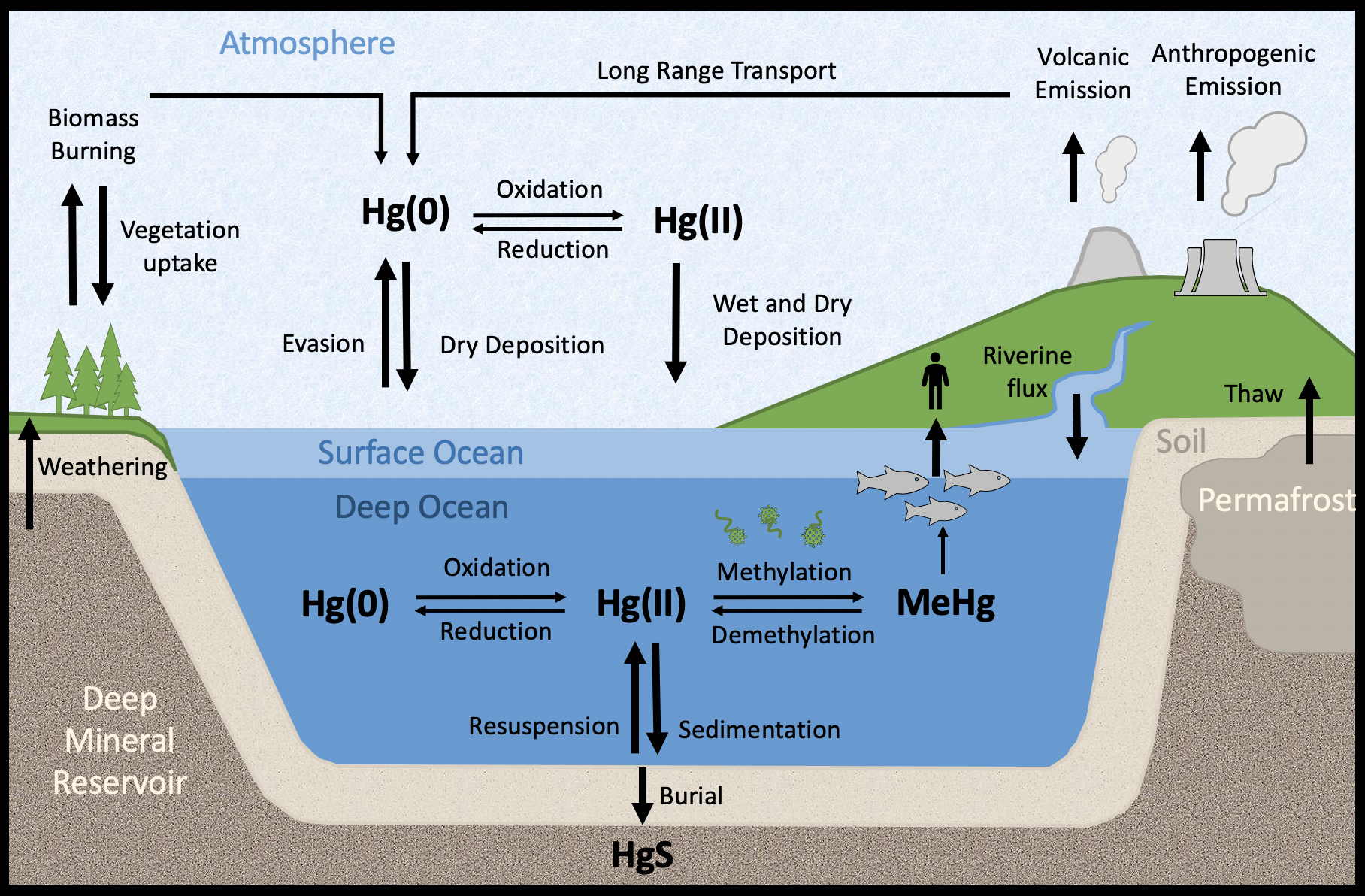
Physical mercury cycle

The mercury cycle is a biogeochemical cycle influenced by natural and anthropogenic processes that transform mercury through multiple chemical forms and environments.

Mercury is present in the Earth's crust and in various forms on the Earth's surface. It can be elemental, inorganic, or organic. Mercury exists in three oxidation states: 0 (elemental mercury), I (mercurous mercury), and II (mercuric mercury).

Mercury emissions to the atmosphere can be primary sources, which release mercury from the lithosphere, or secondary sources, which exchange mercury between surface reservoirs. Annually, over 5000 metric tons of mercury is released to the atmosphere by primary emissions and secondary re-emissions.

== Sources of mercury ==
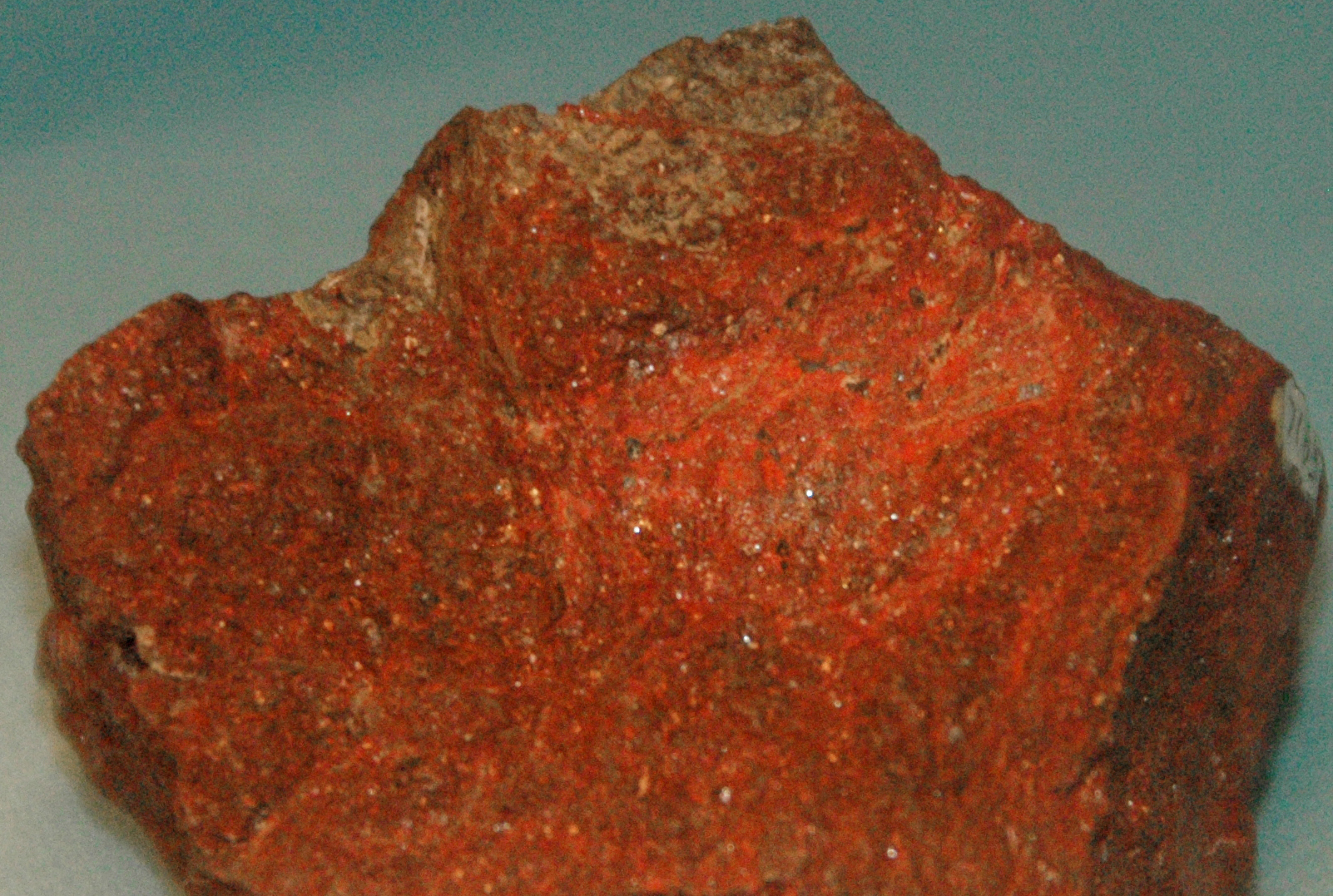
Sample of the mercury sulfide ore, cinnabar

=== Primary sources ===
Primary sources of mercury emissions can be natural or anthropogenic. There are only a few significant mercury ores, most notably the mercury sulfide mineral, cinnabar. Organic-rich sedimentary rocks can also contain elevated mercury. Weathering of minerals and geothermal activity release mercury to the environment. Active volcanoes are another significant primary source of natural mercury. Anthropogenic primary sources of mercury include gold mining, burning coal, and production of non-iron metals, such as copper or lead.

=== Secondary sources ===
Secondary natural sources, which re-emit previously deposited mercury, include vegetation, evasion from oceans and lakes, and biomass burning, including forest fires. Primary anthropogenic emissions are leading to increased sizes of mercury in surface reservoirs.

== Processes ==
Mercury is transported and distributed by atmospheric circulation, which moves elemental mercury from the land to the ocean. Elemental mercury in the atmosphere is returned to the Earth's surface by several routes. A major sink of elemental mercury (Hg(0)) in the atmosphere is through dry deposition. Some of elemental mercury, on the other hand, is photooxidized to gaseous mercury(II), and is returned to the Earth's surface by both dry and wet deposition. Because photooxidation is very slow, elemental mercury can circulate over the entire globe before being oxidized and deposited. Wet and dry deposition is responsible for 90% of the mercury of surface waters, including open ocean.

A fraction of deposited mercury instantaneously re-volatilize back to the atmosphere.

Inorganic mercury can be converted by bacteria and archaea into methylmercury ([CH_{3}Hg]^{+}), which bioaccumulates in marine species such as tuna and swordfish and biomagnifies further up the food chain.

Certain xenophyophores have been found to have abnormally high concentrations of mercury within their bodies.

== See also ==
- Mercury (element)
- Mercury in fish
- Minamata Convention on Mercury
- Mercury poisoning
- COLEX process (isotopic separation)
