= Rock cycle =

Transitional concept of geologic time

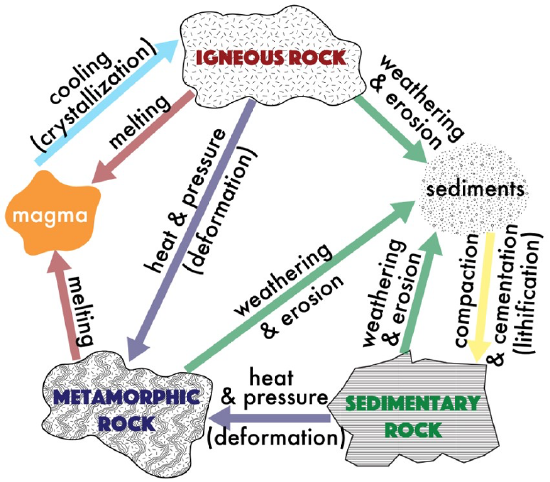
Diagram of the rock cycle

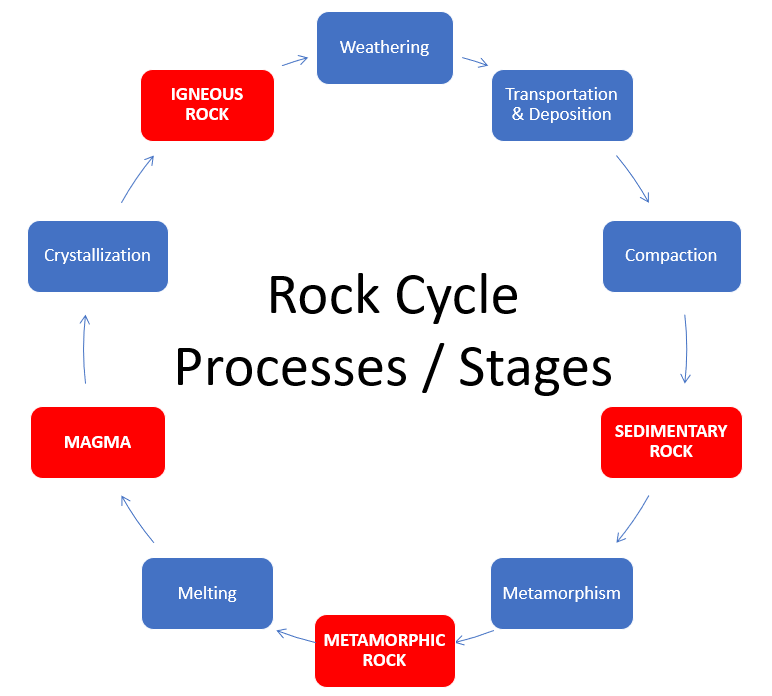
Rock Cycle Processes / Stages

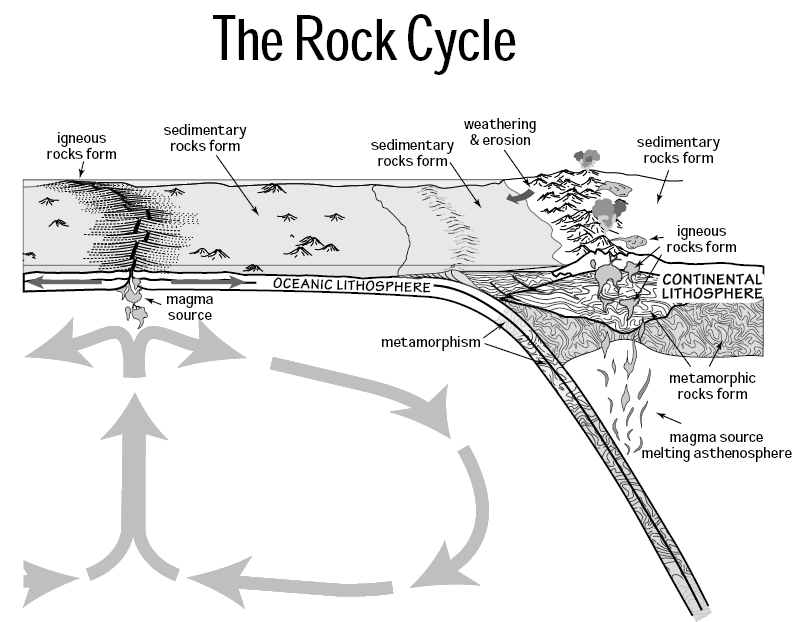
The rock cycle and plate tectonics

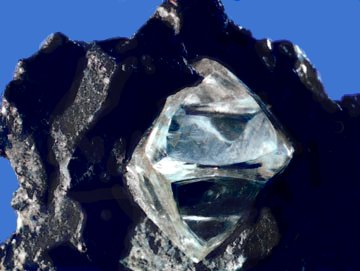
This diamond is a mineral from within an igneous or metamorphic rock that formed at high temperature and pressure

The rock cycle is a basic concept in geology that describes transitions through geologic time among the three main rock types: sedimentary, metamorphic, and igneous. Each rock type is altered when it is forced out of its equilibrium conditions. For example, an igneous rock such as basalt may break down and dissolve when exposed to the atmosphere, or melt as it is subducted under a continent. Due to the driving forces of the rock cycle, plate tectonics and the water cycle, rocks do not remain in equilibrium and change as they encounter new environments. The rock cycle explains how the three rock types are related to each other, and how processes change from one type to another over time. This cyclical aspect makes rock change a geologic cycle and, on planets containing life, a biogeochemical cycle.

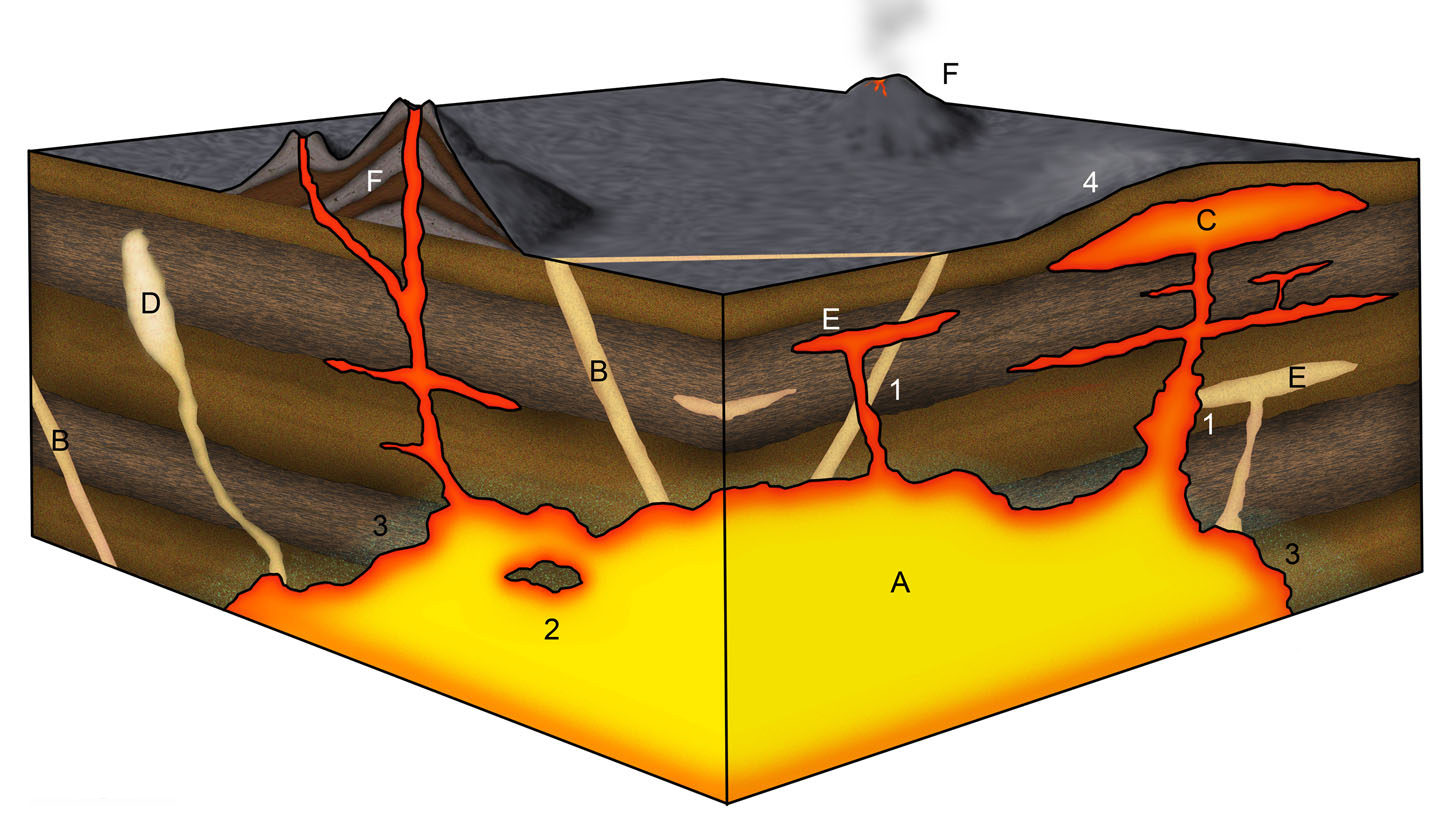
Structures of Igneous Rock. Legend: A = magma chamber (batholith); B = dyke/dike; C = laccolith; D = pegmatite; E = sill; F = stratovolcano; processes: 1 = newer intrusion cutting through older one; 2 = xenolith or roof pendant; 3 = contact metamorphism; 4 = uplift due to laccolith emplacement.

== Transition to sedimentary rock ==
Rocks exposed to the atmosphere are variably unstable and subject to the processes of weathering and erosion. Weathering and erosion break the original rock down into smaller fragments and carry away dissolved material. The transportation and deposition of these fragments occurs through natural agents. This fragmented material accumulates and is buried by additional material, undergoing compaction. While an individual grain of sand is still a member of the class of rock it was formed from, a rock made up of such grains fused together is sedimentary. Sedimentary rocks can be formed from the lithification of these buried smaller fragments (clastic sedimentary rock), the accumulation and lithification of material generated by living organisms (biogenic sedimentary rock - fossils), or lithification of chemically precipitated material from a mineral bearing solution due to evaporation (precipitate sedimentary rock). Clastic rocks can be formed from fragments broken apart from larger rocks of any type, due to processes such as erosion or from organic material, like plant remains. Biogenic and precipitate rocks form from the deposition of minerals from chemicals dissolved from all other rock types.

== Transition to metamorphic rock ==
Rocks exposed to high temperatures and pressures can be changed physically or chemically to form a metamorphic rock, through the process of metamorphism. Regional metamorphism refers to the effects on large masses of rocks over a wide area, typically associated with mountain building events within orogenic belts. These rocks commonly exhibit distinct bands of differing mineralogy and colors, called foliation. Another main type of metamorphism is caused when a body of rock comes into contact with an igneous intrusion that heats up this surrounding country rock. This contact metamorphism results in a rock that is altered and re-crystallized by the extreme heat of the magma and/or by the addition of fluids from the magma that add chemicals to the surrounding rock (metasomatism). Any pre-existing type of rock can be modified by the processes of metamorphism.

== Transition to igneous rock ==
When rocks are pushed deep under the Earth's surface, they undergo rock melting into magma. If the conditions no longer exist for the magma to stay in its liquid state, it cools and undergoes crystallization to solidify into an igneous rock. A rock that cools within the Earth is called intrusive or plutonic and cools very slowly, producing a coarse-grained texture such as the rock granite. As a result of volcanic activity, magma (which is called lava when it reaches Earth's surface) may cool very rapidly on the Earth's surface exposed to the atmosphere and are called extrusive or volcanic rocks. These rocks are fine-grained and sometimes cool so rapidly that no crystals can form and result in a natural glass, such as obsidian, however the most common fine-grained rock would be known as basalt. Any of the three main types of rocks (igneous, sedimentary, and metamorphic rocks) can melt into magma and cool into igneous rocks.

=== Secondary changes ===
Epigenetic change (secondary processes occurring at low temperatures and low pressures) may be arranged under a number of headings, each of which is typical of a group of rocks or rock-forming minerals, though usually more than one of these alterations is in progress in the same rock. Silicification, the replacement of the minerals by crystalline or crypto-crystalline silica, is most common in felsic rocks, such as rhyolite, but is also found in serpentine, etc. Kaolinization is the decomposition of the feldspars, which are the most common minerals in igneous rocks, into kaolin (along with quartz and other clay minerals); it is best shown by granites and syenites. Serpentinization is the alteration of olivine to serpentine (with magnetite); it is typical of peridotites, but occurs in most of the mafic rocks. In uralitization, secondary hornblende replaces augite; chloritization is the alteration of augite (biotite or hornblende) to chlorite, and is seen in many diabases, diorites and greenstones. Epidotization occurs also in rocks of this group, and consists in the development of epidote from biotite, hornblende, augite or plagioclase feldspar.

== Forces that drive the rock cycle ==
=== Plate tectonics ===
In 1967, J. Tuzo Wilson published an article in Nature describing the repeated opening and closing of ocean basins, in particular focusing on the current Atlantic Ocean area. This concept, a part of the plate tectonics revolution, became known as the Wilson cycle. The Wilson cycle has had profound effects on the modern interpretation of the rock cycle as plate tectonics became recognized as the driving force for the rock cycle.

==== Spreading ridges ====
At the mid-ocean divergent boundaries new magma is produced by mantle upwelling and a shallow melting zone. This juvenile basaltic magma is an early phase of the igneous portion of the cycle. As the tectonic plates on either side of the ridge move apart the new rock is carried away from the ridge, the interaction of heated circulating seawater through fractures starts the retrograde metamorphism of the new rock.

==== Subduction zones ====
The new basaltic oceanic crust eventually meets a subduction zone as it moves away from the spreading ridge. As this crust is pulled back into the mantle, the increasing pressure and temperature conditions cause a restructuring of the mineralogy of the rock, this metamorphism alters the rock to form eclogite. As the slab of basaltic crust and some included sediments are dragged deeper, water and other more volatile materials are driven off and rise into the overlying wedge of rock above the subduction zone, which is at a lower pressure. The lower pressure, high temperature, and now volatile rich material in this wedge melts and the resulting buoyant magma rises through the overlying rock to produce island arc or continental margin volcanism. This volcanism includes more silicic lavas the further from the edge of the island arc or continental margin, indicating a deeper source and a more differentiated magma.

At times some of the metamorphosed downgoing slab may be thrust up or obducted onto the continental margin. These blocks of mantle peridotite and the metamorphic eclogites are exposed as ophiolite complexes.

The newly erupted volcanic material is subject to rapid erosion depending on the climate conditions. These sediments accumulate within the basins on either side of an island arc. As the sediments become more deeply buried lithification begins and sedimentary rock results.

==== Continental collision ====
On the closing phase of the classic Wilson cycle, two continental or smaller terranes meet at a convergent zone. As the two masses of continental crust meet, neither can be subducted as they are both low density silicic rock. As the two masses meet, tremendous compressional forces distort and modify the rocks involved. The result is regional metamorphism within the interior of the ensuing orogeny or mountain building event. As the two masses are compressed, folded and faulted into a mountain range by the continental collision the whole suite of pre-existing igneous, volcanic, sedimentary and earlier metamorphic rock units are subjected to this new metamorphic event.

==== Accelerated erosion ====
The high mountain ranges produced by continental collisions are immediately subjected to the forces of erosion. Erosion wears down the mountains and massive piles of sediment are developed in adjacent ocean margins, shallow seas, and as continental deposits. As these sediment piles are buried deeper they become lithified into sedimentary rock. The metamorphic, igneous, and sedimentary rocks of the mountains become the new piles of sediments in the adjoining basins and eventually become sedimentary rock.

==== An evolving process ====
The plate tectonics rock cycle is an evolutionary process. Magma generation, both in the spreading ridge environment and within the wedge above a subduction zone, favors the eruption of the more silicic and volatile rich fraction of the crustal or upper mantle material. This lower density material tends to stay within the crust and not be subducted back into the mantle. The magmatic aspects of plate tectonics tends to gradual segregation within or between the mantle and crust. As magma forms, the initial melt is composed of the more silicic phases that have a lower melting point. This leads to partial melting and further segregation of the lithosphere. In addition the silicic continental crust is relatively buoyant and is not usually subducted back into the mantle. So over time the continental masses grow larger and larger.

=== The role of water ===
The presence of abundant water on Earth plays a fundamental role in driving the rock cycle. Most prominently, water mediates the processes of weathering and erosion, whereby precipitation, acidic soil water, and groundwater dissolve minerals and mechanically break down rocks, particularly igneous and metamorphic lithologies that are unstable under near-surface conditions. Dissolved ions and solid fragments are transported by rivers and other surface flows and ultimately deposited in marine and continental basins, where burial and lithification convert sediments into sedimentary rock.

In addition, water exerts a critical influence on metamorphic processes, especially within newly formed oceanic crust. Circulation of seawater through fractures in basaltic rocks, often enhanced by elevated temperatures, drives hydrothermal alteration reactions such as serpentinization, contributing to the progressive transformation and weakening of oceanic lithosphere.

Furthermore, water and other volatile components play a decisive role in magma generation above subduction zones. Fluids released from the subducting slab lower the melting temperature of the overlying mantle wedge, promoting partial melting. In this context, the release of carbon dioxide from subducted marine limestone links the rock cycle to the carbon cycle, underscoring its role as part of a broader biogeochemical cycle.

== Beyond Earth: The cosmic rock cycle ==
The rock cycle has been a cornerstone of geological education and research. For centuries, geologists have conceptualized the rock cycle as a closed system of transformation confined to Earth. This perspective today appears outdated, tending toward a "geological geocentrism" that limits the understanding of how rocky matter evolves in the universe. Meteorite studies, space exploration, and astronomical observations reveal that the rock cycle is not an exclusively Earth-centered phenomenon but a large-scale process linking the geological evolution of planetary bodies to the interstellar dust produced by stellar death.

The limitations of the traditional rock cycle stem from two interconnected problems that have become increasingly evident as planetary science has matured. First, classical geological thought has remained Earth-centric, treating our planet as the archetypal lithogenic workshop rather than as one of the myriad environments in which rocks form and transform. This perspective, while historically understandable, has crystallized into conceptual frameworks that fail to account for the processes observed throughout the Solar System and beyond. Second, disciplinary fragmentation isolates geologists, planetary scientists, and astrophysicists into parallel communities that use different languages and tools, even though they are studying related phenomena. This fragmentation extends to education, where students learn a rock cycle that excludes most of the lithogenic processes operating throughout the cosmos, representing a missed opportunity to develop the integrative thinking necessary for contemporary geosciences. Reframing the rock cycle at cosmic scales addresses these challenges by establishing a unified theoretical framework that connects micro- and macroscale observations, links geology with astrophysics and planetary science, and affirms the epistemic dignity of the rock cycle as a tool for interdisciplinary understanding.

The cosmic rock cycle originates in interstellar space, where dynamic processes shape the raw materials of planetary systems. Stellar winds, cosmic rays, and supernova explosions modify molecular clouds by selectively removing low-density gas and concentrating matter in denser regions. These dynamics influence the formation of planetary systems and are functionally analogous to terrestrial processes of selective erosion, transport, and deposition. Mineralogical evidence of this interstellar inheritance lies in presolar grains, microscopic crystals of silicon carbide, diamond, and graphite whose age predates the formation of the Sun and points to their origin in astrophysical processes predating the Solar System. These minerals represent the link between stellar death and planetary formation, since when stars die, the dust that constitutes the initial material becomes available for new molecular clouds and subsequently stellar systems, determining a cycling of material between successive generations of stars.

Within protoplanetary disks, the dust and gas of the molecular cloud undergo processes of heating and vaporization. In this turbulent and dynamic environment, a new cycle of rock formation and destruction begins as aggregates of refractory minerals, known as calcium–aluminium-rich inclusions (CAIs) and chondrules, form. These tiny objects undergo processes of fragmentation, remelting, and recrystallization while free-floating in space.

The asteroid rock cycle begins with the accretion of chondritic rocks. Primitive asteroids are subsequently subjected to a cyclic history of collisional destruction, brecciation, and reaccretion. In volatile-rich asteroids, this process includes aqueous alteration: liquid water circulated within their interiors, transforming anhydrous silicates into hydrated clays and other secondary minerals, as documented in carbonaceous chondrite meteorites, cometary samples, and materials returned from Bennu and Ryugu.

Hypervelocity collisions induce shock metamorphism, a process uncommon on Earth but extremely frequent in the Solar System. As asteroids increase in size, internal heat can lead to thermal metamorphism within these bodies, sometimes developing an "onion shell" structure. This heat may become intense enough to cause internal melting, as observed, for example, on asteroid 4 Vesta. Unlike melting on Earth, which involves volcanism and tectonics, melting on asteroids can also occur through impacts.

A form of erosion completely absent from classical diagrams is space weathering, prevalent on all planetary surfaces lacking an atmosphere, which continuously alters airless bodies through exposure to cosmic rays, solar wind irradiation, and micrometeoroid bombardment.

Material exchange between geological contexts renders the rock cycle open rather than closed within a planetary environment. Earth continuously receives approximately 52 million kilograms of interplanetary dust particles annually in the modern era, a modest modern contribution but evidence that planetary bodies have always exchanged material with their cosmic environment. During the Late Heavy Bombardment, this influx was substantially more significant. Impact processes, far more frequent during the early stages of planetary evolution, generate shock metamorphism over progressive intensity scales, creating melt veins and transforming target rocks through pressures and temperatures unavailable in terrestrial environments. Hypervelocity collisions also eject material into space, launching rocks from parent bodies that travel for extended periods before being captured by another world's gravity. When meteorites arrive on a planetary surface, they undergo subsequent chemical alteration and physical modification, integrating extraterrestrial material into the host world's rock cycle.

The driving mechanisms of the rock cycle can be expanded beyond plate tectonics and terrestrial volcanism. Tidal heating, generated by gravitational interactions between moons and their primaries, provides sufficient energy to induce rock melting and sustain volcanic activity on bodies such as Jupiter's moon Io. Tectonics can also operate through non-Earthlike mechanisms. Mercury's lobate scarps and the Moon's wrinkle ridges record planetary-scale deformation driven by interior cooling.

Cryovolcanism and cryotectonics, observed on Europa, Enceladus, and Titan, reshape icy surfaces through the eruption of volatile-rich materials. On Saturn's moon Titan, a methane-based hydrosphere actively shapes the landscape through precipitation, rivers, and lakes, driven by complex photochemical, meteorological, and hydrogeochemical processes.

Finally, impacts or gravitational interactions can produce interstellar object or eject rogue planets from their original systems, transferring geological material across vast distances. Such objects could potentially collide with planets in other stellar systems, entering new rock cycles.

== See also ==
- Cyclic sediments – Type of layers in sedimentary rocks
- Migmatite – Mixture of metamorphic rock and igneous rock
