= Calcium cycle =

Transfer of calcium between dissolved and solid phases

The calcium cycle is a transfer of calcium between dissolved and solid phases. There is a continuous supply of calcium ions into waterways from rocks, organisms, and soils. Calcium ions are consumed and removed from aqueous environments as they react to form insoluble structures such as calcium carbonate and calcium silicate, which can deposit to form sediments or the exoskeletons of organisms. Calcium ions can also be utilized biologically, as calcium is essential to biological functions such as the production of bones and teeth or cellular function. The calcium cycle is a common thread between terrestrial, marine, geological, and biological processes. Calcium moves through these different media as it cycles throughout the Earth. The marine calcium cycle is affected by changing atmospheric carbon dioxide due to ocean acidification.

== Calcium weathering and inputs to seawater ==
Calcium is stored in geologic reservoirs, most commonly in the form of calcium carbonate or as calcium silicate. Calcium-containing rocks include calcite, dolomite, phosphate, and gypsum. Rocks slowly dissolve by physical and chemical processes, carrying calcium ions into rivers and oceans. Calcium ions (Ca^{2+}) and magnesium ions (Mg^{2+}) have the same charge (+2) and similar sizes, so they react similarly and are able to substitute for each other in some minerals, such as carbonates. Ca^{2+}-containing minerals are often more easily weathered than Mg^{2+} minerals, so Ca^{2+} is often more enriched in waterways than Mg^{2+}. Rivers containing more dissolved Ca^{2+} are generally considered more alkaline. Calcium is one of the most common elements found in seawater. Inputs of dissolved calcium (Ca^{2+}) to the ocean include the weathering of calcium sulfate, calcium silicate, and calcium carbonate, basalt-seawater reaction, and dolomitization.

== Biogenic calcium carbonate and the biological pump ==
Biogenic calcium carbonate is formed when marine organisms, such as coccolithophores, corals, pteropods, and other mollusks transform calcium ions and bicarbonate into shells and exoskeletons of calcite or aragonite, both forms of calcium carbonate. This is the dominant sink for dissolved calcium in the ocean. Dead organisms sink to the bottom of the ocean, depositing layers of shell which over time cement to form limestone. This is the origin of both marine and terrestrial limestone.

Calcium precipitates into calcium carbonate according to the following equation:

Ca^{2+} + 2HCO_{3}^{−} → CO_{2}+ H_{2}O + CaCO_{3}

The relationship between dissolved calcium and calcium carbonate is affected greatly by the levels of carbon dioxide (CO_{2}) in the atmosphere.

Increased carbon dioxide leads to more bicarbonate in the ocean according to the following equation:

CO_{2} + CO_{3}^{2−} + H_{2}O → 2HCO_{3}^{−}

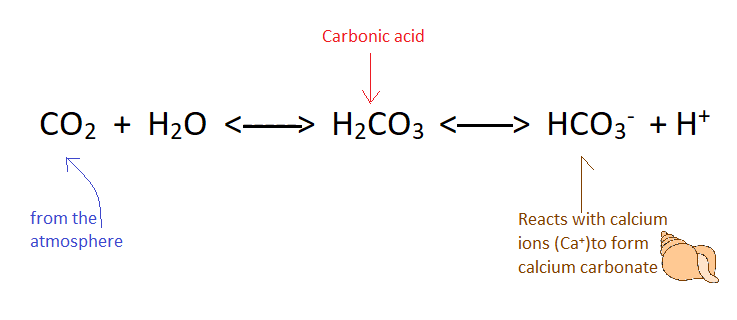
Equilibrium of carbonic acid in the oceans

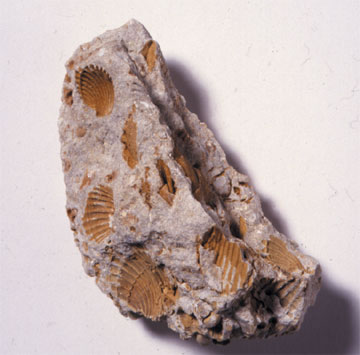
Deposition of calcifying organisms/shells on the ocean floor

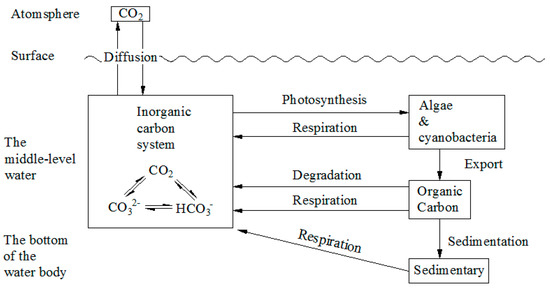
The carbonate cycle in the water environment

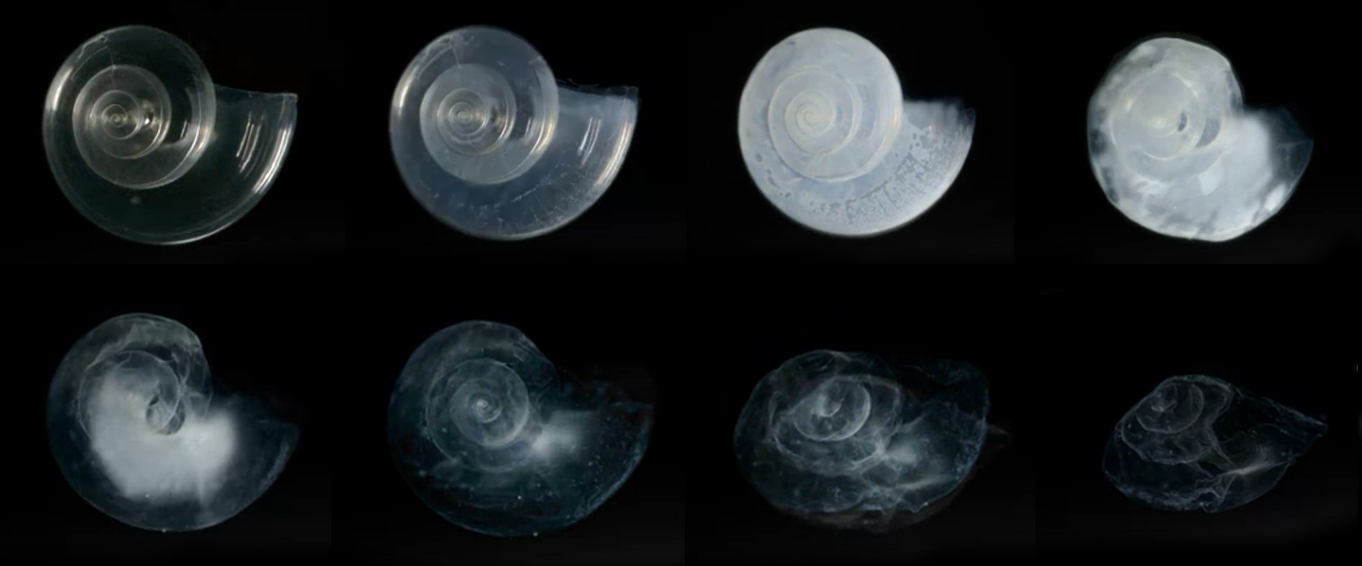
Effects of an acidic ocean (with pH projected for the year 2100) on a pteropod shell made of calcite - the shell progressively dissolves in the lower pH as calcium is drawn out of the shell

With ocean acidification, inputs of carbon dioxide promote the dissolution of calcium carbonate and harm marine organisms dependent on their protective calcite or aragonite shells. The solubility of calcium carbonate increases with pressure and carbon dioxide and decreases with temperature. Thus, calcium carbonate is more soluble in deep waters than surface waters due to higher pressure and lower temperature. As a result, precipitation of calcium carbonate is more common in shallower oceans. The depth at which the rate of calcite dissolution equals the rate of calcite precipitation is known as calcite compensation depth.

=== Changes in global climate and the calcium cycle ===
Ocean acidity due to carbon dioxide has already increased by 25% since the industrial revolution. As carbon dioxide emissions continually increase and accumulate, this will negatively affect the lives of many marine ecosystems. The calcium carbonate used to form many marine organisms' exoskeletons will begin to break down, leaving these animals vulnerable and unable to live in their habitats. This ultimately has a flow on effect to predators, further affecting the function of many food webs globally.

== Changes in calcium concentrations over geologic time ==
Calcium stable isotopes have been used to study inputs and outputs of dissolved calcium in marine environments. For example, one study found that calcium levels have decreased between 25 and 50 percent over a 40 million year timespan, suggesting that dissolved Ca^{2+}outputs have exceeded its inputs. The isotope Calcium-44 can help to indicate variations in calcium carbonate over long timespans and help explain variants in global temperature. Declines in the isotope Calcium-44 usually correlate with periods of cooling, as dissolution of calcium carbonate typically signifies a decrease in temperature. Thus, Calcium isotopes correlate with Earth's climate over long periods of time.

== Human/animal use of calcium ==
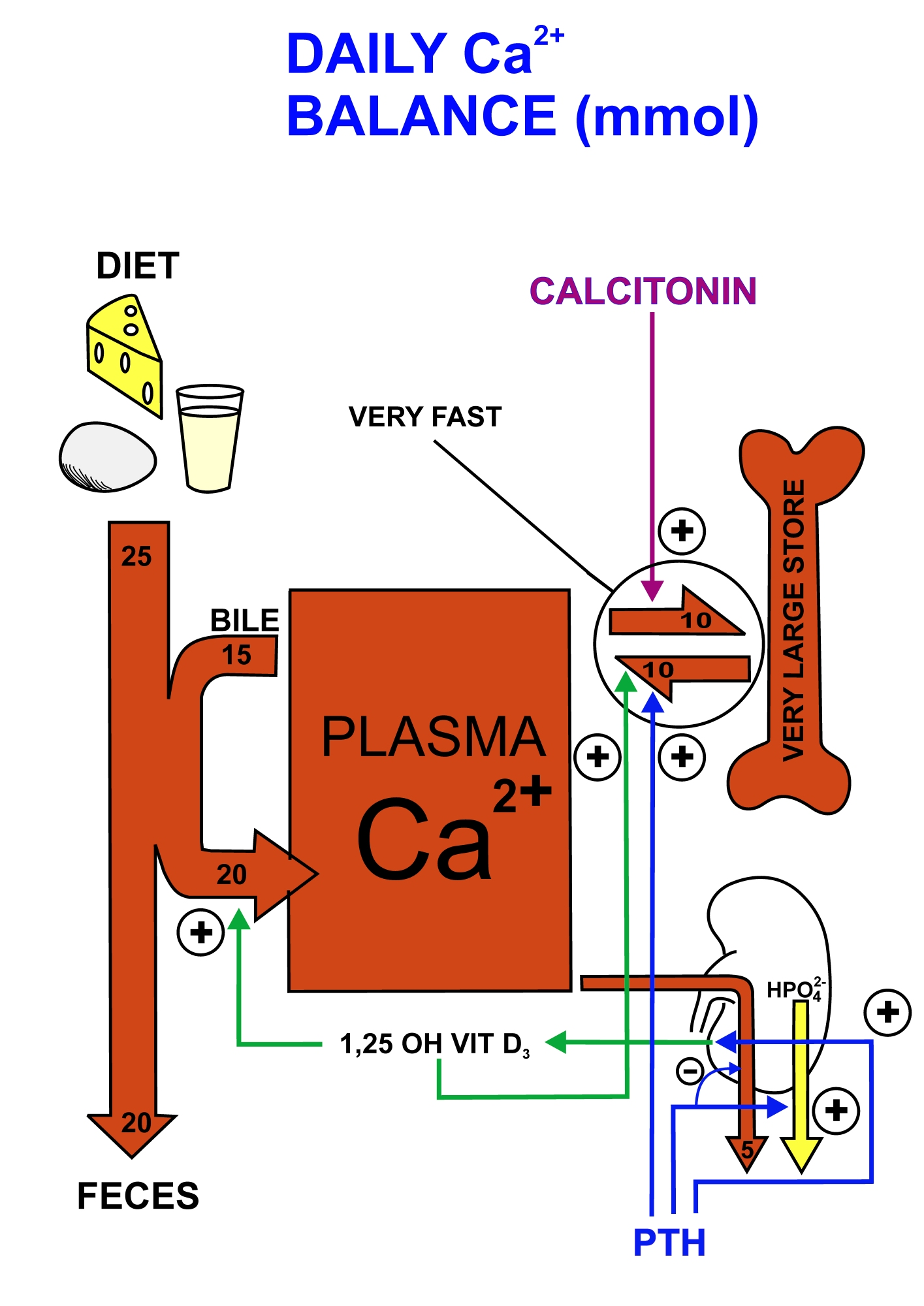
bodily homeostasis of calcium

Being an essential element, calcium is obtained through dietary sources, the majority of which comes from dairy products. The most significant mechanisms controlling calcium use within the body are intestinal absorption, renal filtration, renal reabsorption and bone turnover, which are controlled predominantly by hormones and their corresponding receptors in the gut, kidneys and bones respectively. This allows for calcium use throughout the body, namely in bone growth, cellular signalling, blood clotting, muscle contraction and neuron function.

Calcium is one of the essential components of bone, contributing to its strength and structure in addition to being the main site at which it is stored within the body. Within the muscles, its primary use is to enable contractions. Muscle cells draw calcium from the blood, allowing it to bind with troponin, a component of the muscle fibre that signals for a contraction by moving actin and myosin. After a contraction, calcium dissipates and the filaments move back to a resting state before the release of more calcium for the next contraction. Furthermore, calcium plays a significant role in allowing nerve impulses to be transmitted between neurons. The release of calcium ions from voltage gated ion channels signals for the release of neurotransmitters into the synapse. This allows for the depolarisation of a neuron, thus transmitting the signal to the next neuron where this process is once again repeated. Without the presence of calcium ions, the release of neurotransmitters would not occur, preventing signals from being sent and hindering body processes.

Negative feedback mechanisms are implemented in order to control calcium levels. When low calcium levels are detected in the body, the parathyroid releases parathyroid hormone (PTH) which travels through the bloodstream to the bones and kidneys. In the bones, the presence of PTH stimulates osteoclasts. These cells break down bone to release calcium into the bloodstream where it can be used by the rest of the body in the above processes. In the kidneys, PTH stimulates re-absorption of calcium so it in not lost from the body through urine and returned to the bloodstream instead. Lastly, PTH acts on the intestines by indirectly promoting enzymes that activate vitamin D, a signal for the intestines to absorb more calcium, further increasing blood calcium levels. This will continue until the body releases too much calcium into the bloodstream. Excess calcium then promotes the release of calcitonin from the thyroid gland, effectively reversing the process of PTH. Osteoclast activity is stopped and osteoblasts take over, utilising the excess calcium in the bloodstream to form new bone. Calcium re-absorption in the kidney is prevented, allowing the excretion of excess calcium through the urine. Through these hormonal mechanisms, calcium homeostasis is maintained within the body.

== Calcium in plants and soil ==
movement of calcium from the soil into the roots, through the xylem to the leaves of a plant

Calcium is an essential component of soil. When deposited in the form of lime, it cannot be used by plants. To combat this, carbon dioxide produced by plants reacts with water in the environment to produce carbonic acid. Carbonic acid is then able to dissolve limestone, enabling the release of calcium ions. This reaction is more readily available with smaller particles of limestone than it is with large pieces of rock due to the increased surface area. When lime is leached into soil, calcium levels inevitably increase, both stabilising pH and enabling calcium to mix with water to form Ca^{2+} ions, thus making it soluble and accessible to plants to be absorbed and utilised by the root system. The calcium ions travel up the xylem of the plant alongside water to reach the leaves. The plant can utilise this calcium in the form of calcium pectate to stabilise cell walls and provide rigidity. Calcium is also used by plant enzymes to signal growth and coordinate life-promoting processes. Additionally, the release of calcium ions enables microorganisms to access phosphorus and other micro nutrients with greater ease, improving the soil ecosystem drastically thus indirectly promoting plant growth and nutrition.

Inevitable plant and animal death results in the return of calcium contained within the organism back into the soil to be utilised by other plants. Decomposing organisms break them down, returning the calcium back into the soil and enabling the cycling of calcium to continue. Additionally, these animals and plants are eaten by other animals, similarly continuing the cycle. It is however important to note the modern introduction of calcium into the soil by humans (through fertilisers and other horticultural products) has resulted in a higher concentration of calcium contained within soil.

== Industrial uses of calcium and its impact on the calcium cycle ==
The naturally occurring calcium cycle has been altered by human intervention. Calcium is predominantly extracted from limestone deposits to be utilised by many industrial processes. Purification of iron ore and aluminium, replacing asbestos brake linings and some coatings for electric cables, are some of these major uses of calcium. Furthermore, calcium is used within the household to maintain alkaline pH of swimming pools, counteracting acidic disinfectants and in the food production industry to produce bicarbonate soda, some wines and dough.

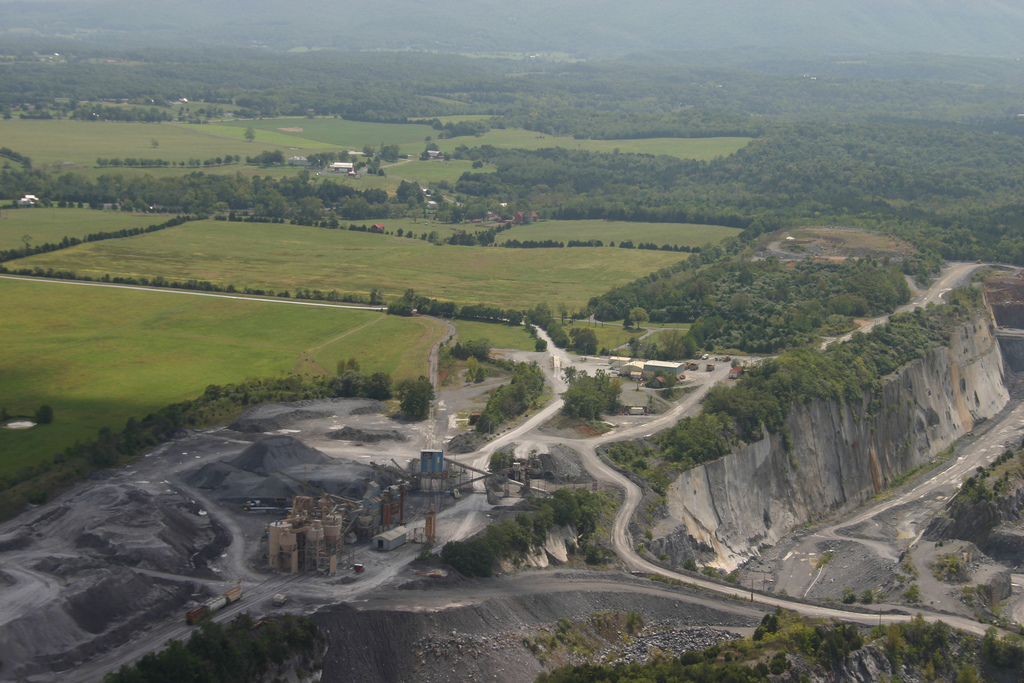
Aerial view of limestone mines at Cedar Creek

With its widespread uses, a large volume of calcium must be obtained from mines and quarries to supply the high demand. As more limestone and water is removed from mines, underground stores of rock are often weakened making the ground more susceptible to sink holes. Sinkholes and mining both affect the presence of groundwater, potentially leading to a lower water table or altered pathways of flowing water. This may affect local ecosystems or farmland as the water supply is restricted. Additionally, the water that is released from mining areas will have higher concentrations of dissolved calcium. This can either be released into oceans or absorbed by the soil. Whilst not always detrimental, it alters the natural calcium cycle which may have flow-on effects for ecosystems. Furthermore, water being pumped from mines increases the danger of downstream flooding whilst simultaneously decreasing the volume on water in upstream reservoirs such as marshes, ponds of wetlands It is however important to note than limestone mining is comparatively less damaging than other mining process, with potential to restore the environment after the mine is no longer in use

== The importance of the calcium cycle and future predictions ==
The calcium cycle links ionic and non ionic calcium together in both marine and terrestrial environments and is essential for the functioning of all living organisms. In animals, calcium enables neurons to transmit signals by opening voltage gated channels that allow neurotransmitters to reach the next cell, bone formation and development and kidney function, whilst being maintained by hormones that ensure calcium homeostasis is reached. In plants, calcium promotes enzyme activity and ensures cell wall function, providing stability to plants. It also enables crustaceans to form shells and corals to exist, as calcium provides structure, rigidity and strength to structures when complexed (combined) to other atoms. Without its presence in the environment, many life-preserving processes would not exist. In the modern context, calcium also enables many industrial processes to occur, promoting further technological developments.

With its close relation to the carbon cycle and the effects of greenhouse gasses, both calcium and carbon cycles are predicted to change in the coming years. Tracking calcium isotopes enables the prediction of environmental changes, with many sources suggesting increasing temperatures in both the atmosphere and marine environment. As a result, this will drastically alter the breakdown of rock, the pH of oceans and waterways and thus calcium sedimentation, hosting an array of implications on the calcium cycle.

Due to the complex interactions of calcium with many facets of life, the effects of altered environmental conditions are unlikely to be known until they occur. Predictions can however be tentatively made, based upon evidence-based research. Increasing carbon dioxide levels and decreasing ocean pH will alter calcium solubility, preventing corals and shelled organisms from developing their calcium-based exoskeletons, thus making them vulnerable or unable to survive.
