= Selenium cycle =

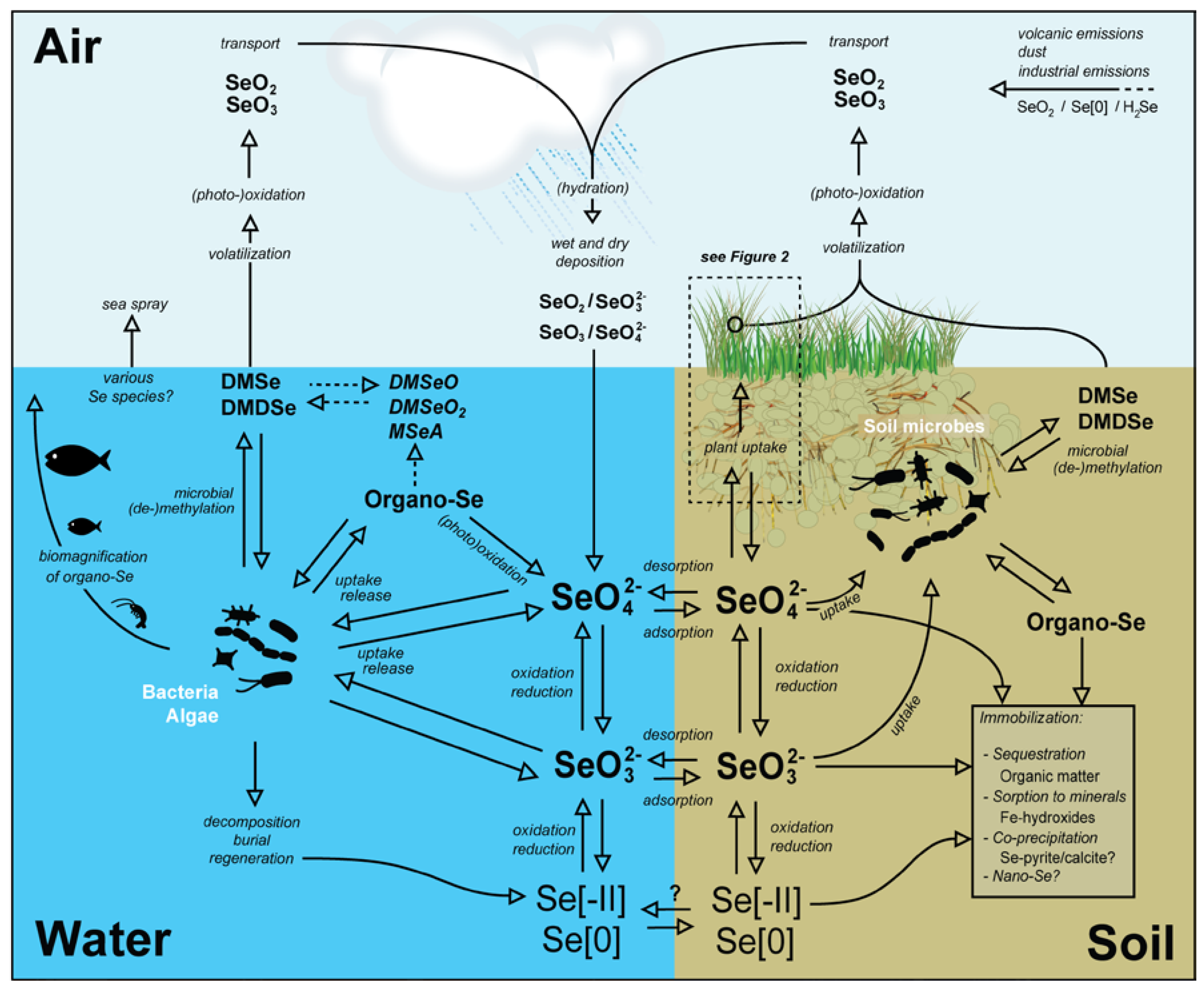
Selenium pathways and transformations Overview of selenium species, pathways and transformations in soil, water, atmosphere and their interfaces. Abiotic and biotic fluxes and transformations are indicated in italics at the corresponding arrows. Potential immobilization processes in soils are listed in the frame-inset.

The selenium cycle is a biological cycle of selenium similar to the cycles of carbon, nitrogen, and sulfur. Within the cycle, there are organisms which reduce the most oxidized form of the element and different organisms complete the cycle by oxidizing the reduced element to the initial state.

In the selenium cycle it has been found that bacteria, fungi, and plants, especially species of Astragalus, metabolize the most oxidized forms of selenium, selenate or selenite, to selenide. It is also thought that microorganisms may be able to oxidize selenium of valence zero to selenium of valence +6.

Evidence for a selenium cycle is found through the study of selenium accumulator plants. These plants are found in semi-arid, seleniferous soils. The plants biosynthesize forms of organic selenium compounds and release the compounds into the soil when they decay. If the compounds were not oxidized, then an increase in organic selenium would be seen, but selenium in these areas is mainly inorganic.

== Aquatic ecosystems ==
There are three fates of dissolved selenium in an aquatic ecosystem: 1. it can be absorbed or ingested by organisms; 2. it can bind with suspended solids or sediments; or 3. it can remain in free solution. Over time, most of the selenium is taken in by organisms or bound to other solids. As the suspended material settles, the selenium accumulates in the top layer of sediment. Due to the dynamic flow in an aquatic ecosystem, selenium is usually only in the sediments temporarily before being cycled back into the system.

=== Immobilization processes ===
Selenium can be removed from the ecosystem and bound in sediment through natural processes of chemical and microbial reduction of the selenate form to the selenite form. The reduction is followed by adsorption to clay, reaction with iron species, and coprecipitation or settling. After selenium is in the sediment, other chemical and microbial reduction may occur, causing insoluble organic, mineral, elemental, or adsorbed selenium. Some organic forms may be released into the atmosphere from volatilization by chemical or microbial activity in the water and sediment or by direct release from plants. Immobilization processes effectively remove selenium from the ecosystem, especially in slow-moving or still-water areas.

=== Mobilization processes ===
Selenium is made available to the food chain through four oxidation and methylation processes. The first process is oxidation and methylation of inorganic and organic selenium by plant roots and microorganisms. The second process is biological mixing and associated oxidation of sediments from the burrowing of benthic invertebrates and feeding of fish and wildlife. The third process is represented by physical movement and chemical oxidation from water circulation and mixing, such as current, wind, precipitation, and upwelling. The fourth process is from oxidation by plant photosynthesis.
