= Intraplate volcanism =

Volcanism away from plate margins

Intraplate volcanism is volcanism that takes place away from the margins of tectonic plates. Most volcanic activity takes place on plate margins, and there is broad consensus among geologists that this activity is explained well by the theory of plate tectonics. However, the origins of volcanic activity within plates remains controversial.

== Mechanisms ==
Mechanisms that have been proposed to explain intraplate volcanism include mantle plumes; non-rigid motion within tectonic plates (the plate model); and impact events. It is likely that different mechanisms accounts for different cases of intraplate volcanism.

=== Plume model ===
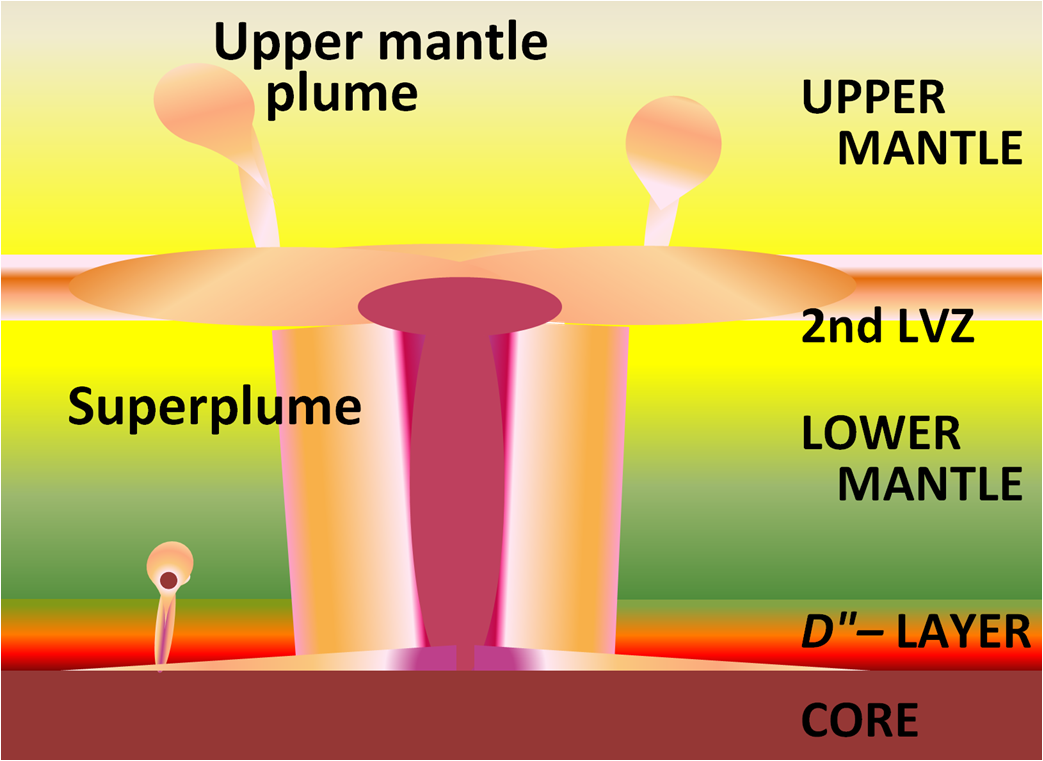
A superplume generated by cooling processes in the mantle (LVZ=low-velocity zone)

A mantle plume is a proposed mechanism of convection of abnormally hot rock within the Earth's mantle. Because the plume head partly melts on reaching shallow depths, a plume is often invoked as the cause of volcanic hotspots, such as Hawaii or Iceland, and large igneous provinces such as the Deccan Traps and Siberian Traps. Some such volcanic regions lie far from tectonic plate boundaries, while others represent unusually large-volume volcanism near plate boundaries.

The hypothesis of mantle plumes has required progressive hypothesis-elaboration leading to variant propositions such as mini-plumes and pulsing plumes.

==== Concepts ====
Mantle plumes were first proposed by J. Tuzo Wilson in 1963 and further developed by W. Jason Morgan in 1971. A mantle plume is posited to exist where hot rock nucleates at the core-mantle boundary and rises through the Earth's mantle becoming a diapir in the Earth's crust. In particular, the concept that mantle plumes are fixed relative to one another, and anchored at the core-mantle boundary, would provide a natural explanation for the time-progressive chains of older volcanoes seen extending out from some such hot spots, such as the Hawaiian–Emperor seamount chain. However, paleomagnetic data show that mantle plumes can be associated with Large Low Shear Velocity Provinces (LLSVPs) and do move.

Two largely independent convective processes are proposed:

- the broad convective flow associated with plate tectonics, driven primarily by the sinking of cold plates of lithosphere back into the mantle asthenosphere
- the mantle plume, driven by heat exchange across the core-mantle boundary carrying heat upward in a narrow, rising column, and postulated to be independent of plate motions.

The plume hypothesis was studied using laboratory experiments conducted in small fluid-filled tanks in the early 1970s. Thermal or compositional fluid-dynamical plumes produced in that way were presented as models for the much larger postulated mantle plumes. Based on these experiments, mantle plumes are now postulated to comprise two parts: a long thin conduit connecting the top of the plume to its base, and a bulbous head that expands in size as the plume rises. The entire structure is considered to resemble a mushroom. The bulbous head of thermal plumes forms because hot material moves upward through the conduit faster than the plume itself rises through its surroundings. In the late 1980s and early 1990s, experiments with thermal models showed that as the bulbous head expands it may entrain some of the adjacent mantle into the head.

The sizes and occurrence of mushroom mantle plumes can be predicted easily by transient instability theory developed by Tan and Thorpe. The theory predicts mushroom shaped mantle plumes with heads of about 2000 km diameter that have a critical time of about 830 Myr for a core mantle heat flux of 20 mW/m^{2}, while the cycle time is about 2 Gyr. The number of mantle plumes is predicted to be about 17.

When a plume head encounters the base of the lithosphere, it is expected to flatten out against this barrier and to undergo widespread decompression melting to form large volumes of basalt magma. It may then erupt onto the surface. Numerical modelling predicts that melting and eruption will take place over several million years. These eruptions have been linked to flood basalts, although many of those erupt over much shorter time scales (less than 1 million years). Examples include the Deccan Traps in India, the Siberian Traps of Asia, the Karoo-Ferrar basalts/dolerites in South Africa and Antarctica, the Paraná and Etendeka traps in South America and Africa (formerly a single province separated by opening of the South Atlantic Ocean), and the Columbia River basalts of North America. Flood basalts in the oceans are known as oceanic plateaus, and include the Ontong Java Plateau of the western Pacific Ocean and the Kerguelen Plateau of the Indian Ocean.

The narrow vertical pipe, or conduit, postulated to connect the plume head to the core-mantle boundary, is viewed as providing a continuous supply of magma to a fixed location, often referred to as a "hotspot". As the overlying tectonic plate (lithosphere) moves over this hotspot, the eruption of magma from the fixed conduit onto the surface is expected to form a chain of volcanoes that parallels plate motion. The Hawaiian Islands chain in the Pacific Ocean is the type example. It has recently been discovered that the volcanic locus of this chain has not been fixed over time, and it thus joined the club of the many type examples that do not exhibit the key characteristic originally proposed.

The eruption of continental flood basalts is often associated with continental rifting and breakup. This has led to the hypothesis that mantle plumes contribute to continental rifting and the formation of ocean basins. In the context of the alternative "Plate model", continental breakup is a process integral to plate tectonics, and massive volcanism occurs as a natural consequence when it starts.

The current mantle plume theory is that material and energy from Earth's interior are exchanged with the surface crust in two distinct modes: the predominant, steady state plate tectonic regime driven by upper mantle convection, and a punctuated, intermittently dominant, mantle overturn regime driven by plume convection. This second regime, while often discontinuous, is periodically significant in mountain building and continental breakup.

===== Chemistry, heat flow and melting =====
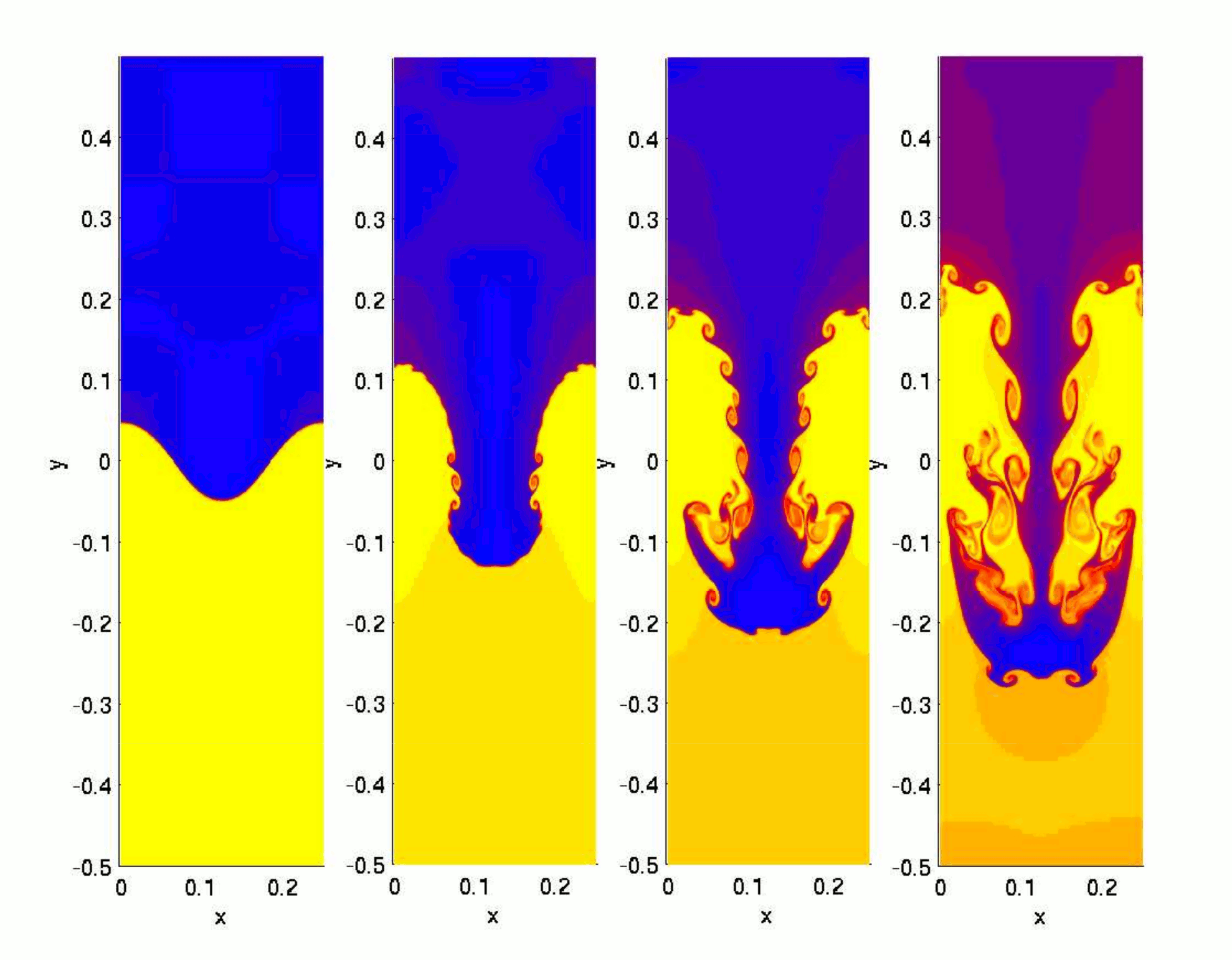
Hydrodynamic simulation of a single "finger" of the Rayleigh–Taylor instability, a possible mechanism for plume formation. In the third and fourth frame in the sequence, the plume forms a "mushroom cap". Note that the core is at the top of the diagram and the crust is at the bottom.

Earth cross-section showing location of upper (3) and lower (5) mantle, D″-layer (6), and outer (7) and inner (9) core

The chemical and isotopic composition of basalts found at hotspots differs subtly from mid-ocean-ridge basalts. These basalts, also called ocean island basalts (OIBs), are analysed in their radiogenic and stable isotope compositions. In radiogenic isotope systems the originally subducted material creates diverging trends, termed mantle components. Identified mantle components are DMM (depleted mid-ocean ridge basalt (MORB) mantle), HIMU (high U/Pb-ratio mantle), EM1 (enriched mantle 1), EM2 (enriched mantle 2) and FOZO (focus zone). This geochemical signature arises from the mixing of near-surface materials such as subducted slabs and continental sediments, in the mantle source. There are two competing interpretations for this. In the context of mantle plumes, the near-surface material is postulated to have been transported down to the core-mantle boundary by subducting slabs, and to have been transported back up to the surface by plumes. In the context of the Plate hypothesis, subducted material is mostly re-circulated in the shallow mantle and tapped from there by volcanoes.

Stable isotopes like Fe are used to track processes that the uprising material experiences during melting.

The processing of oceanic crust, lithosphere, and sediment through a subduction zone decouples the water-soluble trace elements (e.g., K, Rb, Th) from the immobile trace elements (e.g., Ti, Nb, Ta), concentrating the immobile elements in the oceanic slab (the water-soluble elements are added to the crust in island arc volcanoes). Seismic tomography shows that subducted oceanic slabs sink as far as the bottom of the mantle transition zone at 650 km depth. Subduction to greater depths is less certain, but there is evidence that they may sink to mid-lower-mantle depths at about 1,500 km depth.

The source of mantle plumes is postulated to be the core-mantle boundary at 3,000 km depth. Because there is little material transport across the core-mantle boundary, heat transfer must occur by conduction, with adiabatic gradients above and below this boundary. The core-mantle boundary is a strong thermal (temperature) discontinuity. The temperature of the core is approximately 1,000 degrees Celsius higher than that of the overlying mantle. Plumes are postulated to rise as the base of the mantle becomes hotter and more buoyant.

Plumes are postulated to rise through the mantle and begin to partially melt on reaching shallow depths in the asthenosphere by decompression melting. This would create large volumes of magma. The plume hypothesis postulates that this melt rises to the surface and erupts to form "hot spots".

==== The lower mantle and the core ====
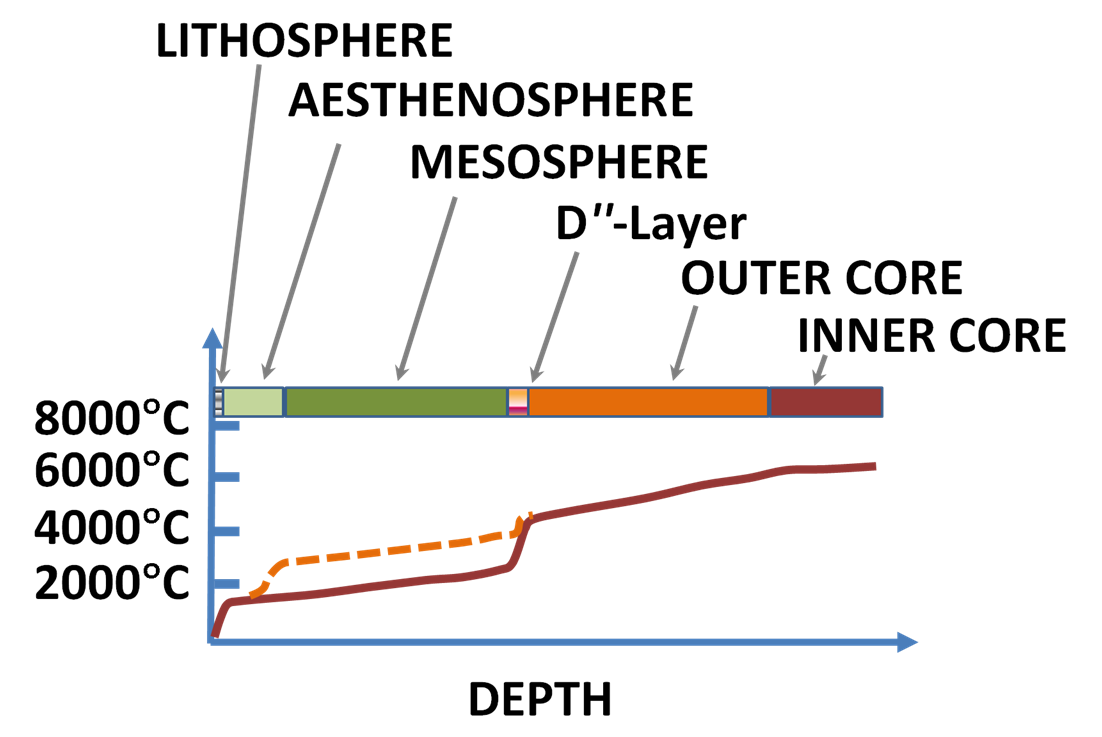
Calculated Earth's temperature vs. depth. Dashed curve: Layered mantle convection; Solid curve: Whole mantle convection.

The most prominent thermal contrast known to exist in the deep (1000 km) mantle is at the core-mantle boundary at 2900 km. Mantle plumes were originally postulated to rise from this layer because the "hot spots" that are assumed to be their surface expression were thought to be fixed relative to one another. This required that plumes were sourced from beneath the shallow asthenosphere that is thought to be flowing rapidly in response to motion of the overlying tectonic plates. There is no other known major thermal boundary layer in the deep Earth, and so the core-mantle boundary was the only candidate.

The base of the mantle is known as the D″ layer, a seismological subdivision of the Earth. It appears to be compositionally distinct from the overlying mantle, and may contain partial melt.

Two very broad, large low-shear-velocity provinces, exist in the lower mantle under Africa and under the central Pacific. It is postulated that plumes rise from their surface or their edges. Their low seismic velocities were thought to suggest that they are relatively hot, although it has recently been shown that their low wave velocities are due to high density caused by chemical heterogeneity.

==== Evidence for the theory ====
Various lines of evidence have been cited in support of mantle plumes. There is some confusion regarding what constitutes support, as there has been a tendency to re-define the postulated characteristics of mantle plumes after observations have been made.

Some common and basic lines of evidence cited in support of the theory are linear volcanic chains, noble gases, geophysical anomalies, and geochemistry.

===== Linear volcanic chains =====
The age-progressive distribution of the Hawaiian-Emperor seamount chain has been explained as a result of a fixed, deep-mantle plume rising into the upper mantle, partly melting, and causing a volcanic chain to form as the plate moves overhead relative to the fixed plume source. Other "hot spots" with time-progressive volcanic chains behind them include Réunion, the Chagos-Laccadive Ridge, the Louisville Ridge, the Ninety East Ridge and Kerguelen, Tristan, and Yellowstone.

An intrinsic aspect of the plume hypothesis is that the "hot spots" and their volcanic trails have been fixed relative to one another throughout geological time. Whereas there is evidence that the chains listed above are time-progressive, it has, however, been shown that they are not fixed relative to one another. The most remarkable example of this is the Emperor chain, the older part of the Hawaii system, which was formed by migration of volcanic activity across a geo-stationary plate.

Many postulated "hot spots" are also lacking time-progressive volcanic trails, e.g., Iceland, the Galapagos, and the Azores. Mismatches between the predictions of the hypothesis and observations are commonly explained by auxiliary processes such as "mantle wind", "ridge capture", "ridge escape" and lateral flow of plume material.

===== Noble gas and other isotopes =====
Helium-3 is a primordial isotope that formed in the Big Bang. Very little is produced, and little has been added to the Earth by other processes since then. Helium-4 includes a primordial component, but it is also produced by the natural radioactive decay of elements such as uranium and thorium. Over time, helium in the upper atmosphere is lost into space. Thus, the Earth has become progressively depleted in helium, and ^{3}He is not replaced as ^{4}He is. As a result, the ratio ^{3}He/^{4}He in the Earth has decreased over time.

Unusually high ^{3}He/^{4}He have been observed in some, but not all, "hot spots". In mantle plume theory, this is explained by plumes tapping a deep, primordial reservoir in the lower mantle, where the original, high ^{3}He/^{4}He ratios have been preserved throughout geologic time. In the context of the Plate hypothesis, the high ratios are explained by preservation of old material in the shallow mantle. Ancient, high ^{3}He/^{4}He ratios would be particularly easily preserved in materials lacking U or Th, so ^{4}He was not added over time. Olivine and dunite, both found in subducted crust, are materials of this sort.

Other elements, e.g. osmium, have been suggested to be tracers of material arising from near to the Earth's core, in basalts at oceanic islands. However, so far conclusive proof for this is lacking.

===== Geophysical anomalies =====
Diagram showing a cross section though the Earth's lithosphere (in yellow) with magma rising from the mantle (in red). The crust may move relative to the plume, creating a track.

The plume hypothesis has been tested by looking for the geophysical anomalies predicted to be associated with them. These include thermal, seismic, and elevation anomalies. Thermal anomalies are inherent in the term "hotspot". They can be measured in numerous different ways, including surface heat flow, petrology, and seismology. Thermal anomalies produce anomalies in the speeds of seismic waves, but unfortunately so do composition and partial melt. As a result, wave speeds cannot be used simply and directly to measure temperature, but more sophisticated approaches must be taken.

Seismic anomalies are identified by mapping variations in wave speed as seismic waves travel through Earth. A hot mantle plume is predicted to have lower seismic wave speeds compared with similar material at a lower temperature. Mantle material containing a trace of partial melt (e.g., as a result of it having a lower melting point), or being richer in Fe, also has a lower seismic wave speed and those effects are stronger than temperature. Thus, although unusually low wave speeds have been taken to indicate anomalously hot mantle beneath "hot spots", this interpretation is ambiguous. The most commonly cited seismic wave-speed images that are used to look for variations in regions where plumes have been proposed come from seismic tomography. This method involves using a network of seismometers to construct three-dimensional images of the variation in seismic wave speed throughout the mantle.

Seismic waves generated by large earthquakes enable structure below the Earth's surface to be determined along the ray path. Seismic waves that have traveled a thousand or more kilometers (also called teleseismic waves) can be used to image large regions of Earth's mantle. They also have limited resolution, however, and only structures at least several hundred kilometers in diameter can be detected.

Seismic tomography images have been cited as evidence for a number of mantle plumes in Earth's mantle. There is, however, vigorous on-going discussion regarding whether the structures imaged are reliably resolved, and whether they correspond to columns of hot, rising rock.

The mantle plume hypothesis predicts that domal topographic uplifts will develop when plume heads impinge on the base of the lithosphere. An uplift of this kind occurred when the north Atlantic Ocean opened about 54 million years ago. Some scientists have linked this to a mantle plume postulated to have caused the breakup of Eurasia and the opening of the north Atlantic, now suggested to underlie Iceland. Current research has shown that the time-history of the uplift is probably much shorter than predicted, however. It is thus not clear how strongly this observation supports the mantle plume hypothesis.

===== Geochemistry =====
Basalts found at oceanic islands are geochemically distinct from those found at mid-ocean ridges and volcanoes associated with subduction zones (island arc basalts). "Ocean island basalt" is also similar to basalts found throughout the oceans on both small and large seamounts (thought to be formed by eruptions on the sea floor that did not rise above the surface of the ocean). They are also compositionally similar to some basalts found in the interiors of the continents (e.g., the Snake River Plain).

In major elements, ocean island basalts are typically higher in iron (Fe) and titanium (Ti) than mid-ocean ridge basalts at similar magnesium (Mg) contents. In trace elements, they are typically more enriched in the light rare-earth elements than mid-ocean ridge basalts. Compared to island arc basalts, ocean island basalts are lower in alumina (Al_{2}O_{3}) and higher in immobile trace elements (e.g., Ti, Nb, Ta).

These differences result from processes that occur during the subduction of oceanic crust and mantle lithosphere. Oceanic crust (and to a lesser extent, the underlying mantle) typically becomes hydrated to varying degrees on the seafloor, partly as the result of seafloor weathering, and partly in response to hydrothermal circulation near the mid-ocean-ridge crest where it was originally formed. As oceanic crust and underlying lithosphere subduct, water is released by dehydration reactions, along with water-soluble elements and trace elements. This enriched fluid rises to metasomatize the overlying mantle wedge and leads to the formation of island arc basalts. The subducting slab is depleted in these water-mobile elements (e.g., K, Rb, Th, Pb) and thus relatively enriched in elements that are not water-mobile (e.g., Ti, Nb, Ta) compared to both mid-ocean ridge and island arc basalts.

Ocean island basalts are also relatively enriched in immobile elements relative to the water-mobile elements. This, and other observations, have been interpreted as indicating that the distinct geochemical signature of ocean island basalts results from inclusion of a component of subducted slab material. This must have been recycled in the mantle, then re-melted and incorporated in the lavas erupted. In the context of the plume hypothesis, subducted slabs are postulated to have been subducted down as far as the core-mantle boundary, and transported back up to the surface in rising plumes. In the plate hypothesis, the slabs are postulated to have been recycled at shallower depths – in the upper few hundred kilometers that make up the upper mantle. However, the plate hypothesis is inconsistent with both the geochemistry of shallow asthenosphere melts (i.e., Mid-ocean ridge basalts) and with the isotopic compositions of ocean island basalts.

===== Seismology =====
In 2015, based on data from 273 large earthquakes, researchers compiled a model based on full waveform tomography, requiring the equivalent of 3 million hours of supercomputer time. Due to computational limitations, high-frequency data still could not be used, and seismic data remained unavailable from much of the seafloor. Nonetheless, vertical plumes, 400 C hotter than the surrounding rock, were visualized under many hotspots, including the Pitcairn, Macdonald, Samoa, Tahiti, Marquesas, Galapagos, Cape Verde, and Canary hotspots. They extended nearly vertically from the core-mantle boundary (2900 km depth) to a possible layer of shearing and bending at 1000 km. They were detectable because they were 600–800 km wide, more than three times the width expected from contemporary models. Many of these plumes are in the large low-shear-velocity provinces under Africa and the Pacific, while some other hotspots such as Yellowstone were less clearly related to mantle features in the model.

The unexpected size of the plumes leaves open the possibility that they may conduct the bulk of the Earth's 44 terawatts of internal heat flow from the core to the surface, and means that the lower mantle convects less than expected, if at all. It is possible that there is a compositional difference between plumes and the surrounding mantle that slows them down and broadens them.

==== Suggested mantle plume locations ====
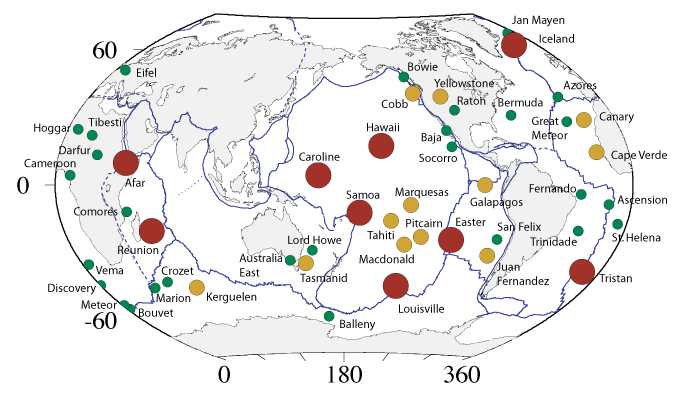
An example of plume locations suggested by one recent group. Figure from Foulger (2010).

Many different localities have been suggested to be underlain by mantle plumes, and scientists cannot agree on a definitive list. Some scientists suggest that several tens of plumes exist, whereas others suggest that there are none. The theory was really inspired by the Hawaiian volcano system. Hawaii is a large volcanic edifice in the center of the Pacific Ocean, far from any plate boundaries. Its regular, time-progressive chain of islands and seamounts superficially fits the plume theory well. However, it is almost unique on Earth, as nothing as extreme exists anywhere else. The second strongest candidate for a plume location is often quoted to be Iceland, but according to opponents of the plume hypothesis its massive nature can be explained by plate tectonic forces along the mid-Atlantic spreading center.

Mantle plumes have been suggested as the source for flood basalts. These extremely rapid, large scale eruptions of basaltic magmas have periodically formed continental flood basalt provinces on land and oceanic plateaus in the ocean basins, such as the Deccan Traps, the Siberian Traps the Karoo-Ferrar flood basalts of Gondwana, and the largest known continental flood basalt, the Central Atlantic magmatic province (CAMP).

Many continental flood basalt events coincide with continental rifting. This is consistent with a system that tends toward equilibrium: as matter rises in a mantle plume, other material is drawn down into the mantle, causing rifting.

=== Plate theory ===
The hypothesis of mantle plumes from depth is not universally accepted as explaining all such volcanism. It has required progressive hypothesis-elaboration leading to variant propositions such as mini-plumes and pulsing plumes. Another hypothesis for unusual volcanic regions is the plate theory. This proposes shallower, passive leakage of magma from the mantle onto the Earth's surface where extension of the lithosphere permits it, attributing most volcanism to plate tectonic processes, with volcanoes far from plate boundaries resulting from intraplate extension.

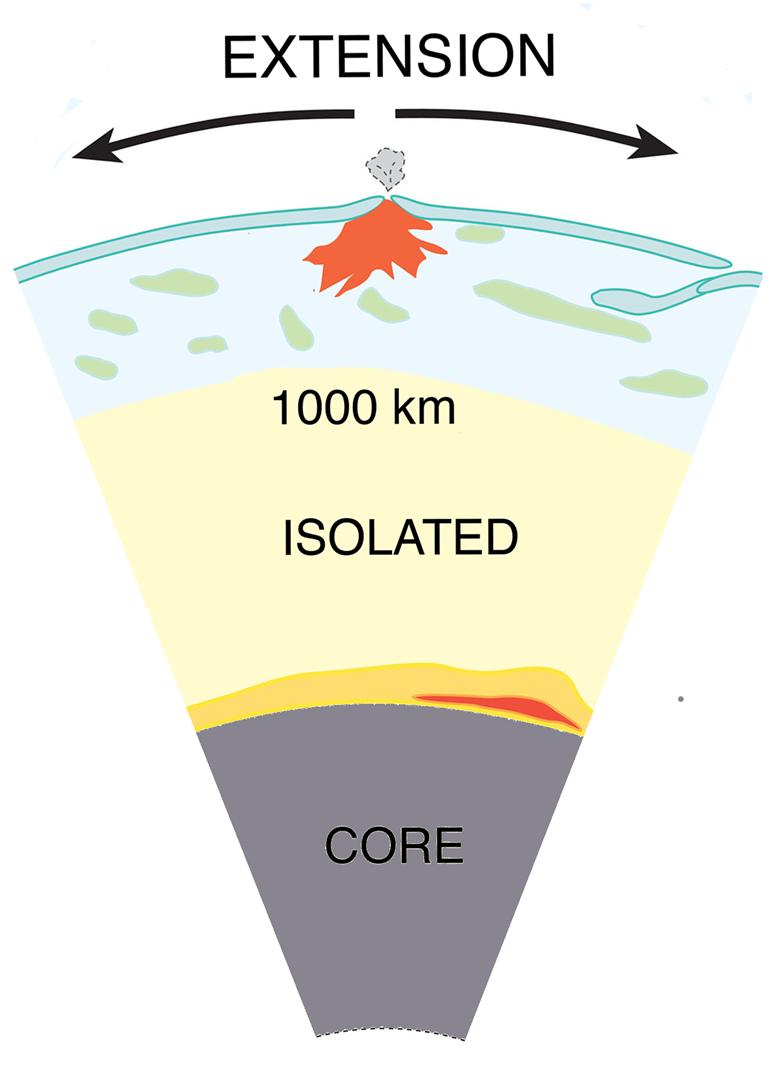
Schematic of the plate theory. Mid-blue: lithosphere; light-blue/green: inhomogeneous upper mantle; yellow: lower mantle; orange/red: core-mantle boundary. Lithospheric extension enables pre-existing melt (red) to rise.

The plate theory attributes all volcanic activity on Earth, even that which appears superficially to be anomalous, to the operation of plate tectonics. According to the plate theory, the principal cause of volcanism is extension of the lithosphere. Extension of the lithosphere is a function of the lithospheric stress field. The global distribution of volcanic activity at a given time reflects the contemporaneous lithospheric stress field, and changes in the spatial and temporal distribution of volcanoes reflect changes in the stress field. The main factors governing the evolution of the stress field are:

1. Changes in the configuration of plate boundaries.
2. Vertical motions.
3. Thermal contraction.

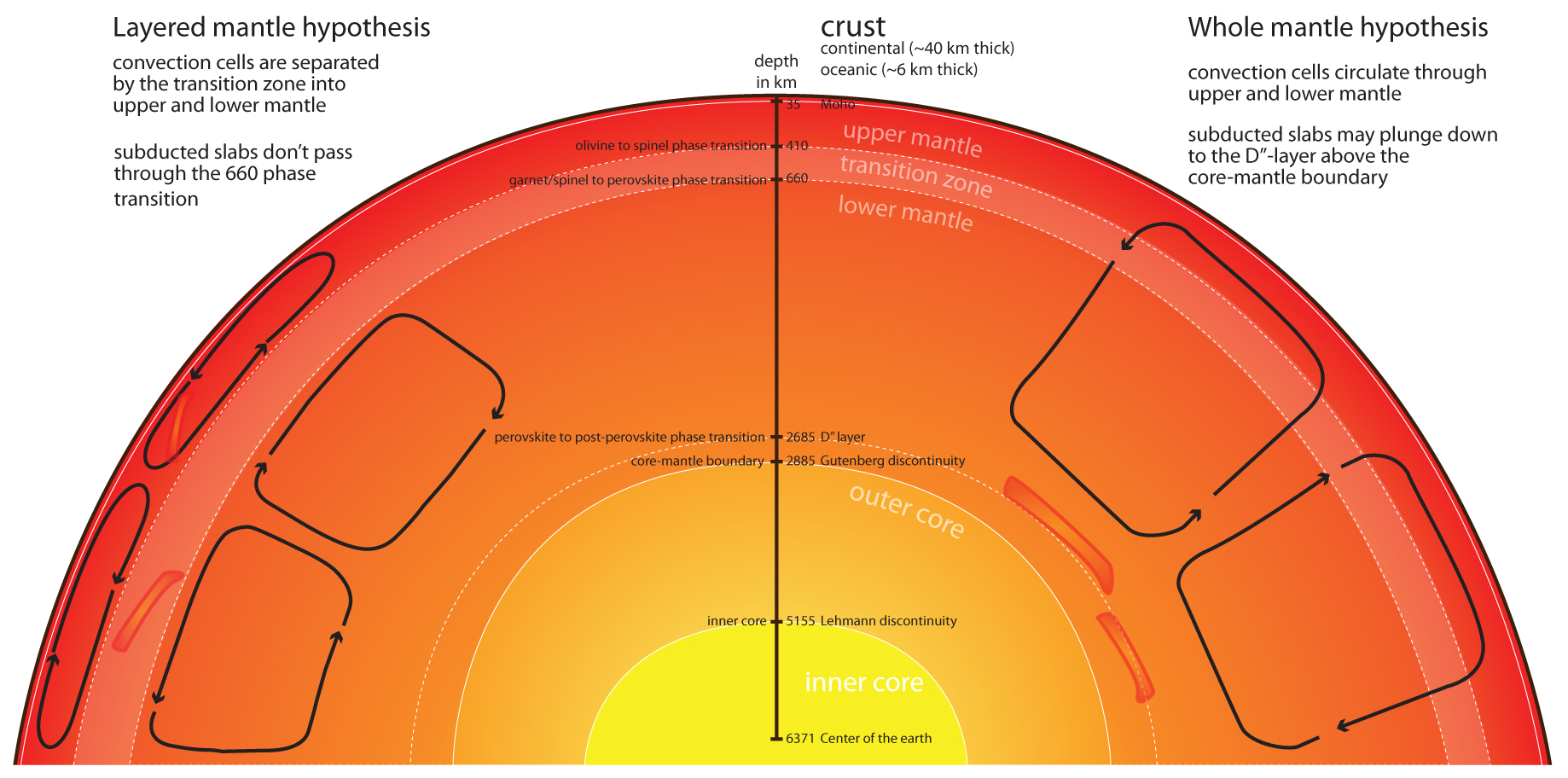
An illustration of competing models of crustal recycling and the fate of subducted slabs. The plume hypothesis invokes deep subduction (right), while the plate hypothesis focuses on shallow subduction (left).

Beginning in the early 2000s, dissatisfaction with the state of the evidence for mantle plumes and the proliferation of ad hoc hypotheses drove a number of geologists, led by Don L. Anderson, Gillian Foulger, and Warren B. Hamilton, to propose a broad alternative based on shallow processes in the upper mantle and above, with an emphasis on plate tectonics as the driving force of magmatism.

The plate hypothesis suggests that "anomalous" volcanism results from lithospheric extension that permits melt to rise passively from the asthenosphere beneath. It is thus the conceptual inverse of the plume hypothesis because the plate hypothesis attributes volcanism to shallow, near-surface processes associated with plate tectonics, rather than active processes arising at the core-mantle boundary.

Lithospheric extension is attributed to processes related to plate tectonics. These processes are well understood at mid-ocean ridges, where most of Earth's volcanism occurs. It is less commonly recognised that the plates themselves deform internally, and can permit volcanism in those regions where the deformation is extensional. Well-known examples are the Basin and Range Province in the western USA, the East African Rift valley, and the Rhine Graben. Under this hypothesis, variable volumes of magma are attributed to variations in chemical composition (large volumes of volcanism corresponding to more easily molten mantle material) rather than to temperature differences.

While not denying the presence of deep mantle convection and upwelling in general, the plate hypothesis holds that these processes do not result in mantle plumes, in the sense of columnar vertical features that span most of the Earth's mantle, transport large amounts of heat, and contribute to surface volcanism.

Under the umbrella of the plate hypothesis, the following sub-processes, all of which can contribute to permitting surface volcanism, are recognised:

- Continental break-up;
- Fertility at mid-ocean ridges;
- Enhanced volcanism at plate boundary junctions;
- Small-scale sublithospheric convection;
- Oceanic intraplate extension;
- Slab tearing and break-off;
- Shallow mantle convection;
- Abrupt lateral changes in stress at structural discontinuities;
- Continental intraplate extension;
- Catastrophic lithospheric thinning;
- Sublithospheric melt ponding and draining.

Lithospheric extension enables pre-existing melt in the crust and mantle to escape to the surface. If extension is severe and thins the lithosphere to the extent that the asthenosphere rises, then additional melt is produced by decompression upwelling.

A major virtue of the plate theory is that it extends plate tectonics into a unifying account of the Earth's volcanism which dispenses with the need to invoke extraneous hypotheses designed to accommodate instances of volcanic activity which appear superficially to be exceptional.

==== Origins of the plate theory ====
Developed during the late 1960s and 1970s, plate tectonics provided an elegant explanation for most of the Earth's volcanic activity. At spreading boundaries where plates move apart, the asthenosphere decompresses and melts to form new oceanic crust. At subduction zones, slabs of oceanic crust sink into the mantle, dehydrate, and release volatiles which lower the melting temperature and give rise to volcanic arcs and back-arc extensions. Several volcanic provinces, however, do not fit this simple picture and have traditionally been considered exceptional cases which require a non-plate-tectonic explanation.

Just prior to the development of plate tectonics in the early 1960s, the Canadian Geophysicist John Tuzo Wilson suggested that chains of volcanic islands form from movement of the seafloor over relatively stationary hotspots in stable centres of mantle convection cells. In the early 1970s, Wilson's idea was revived by the American geophysicist W. Jason Morgan. In order to account for the long-lived supply of magma that some volcanic regions seemed to require, Morgan modified the hypothesis, shifting the source to a thermal boundary layer. Because of the perceived fixity of some volcanic sources relative to the plates, he proposed that this thermal boundary was deeper than the convecting upper mantle on which the plates ride and located it at the core-mantle boundary, 3,000 km beneath the surface. He suggested that narrow convection currents rise from fixed points at this thermal boundary and form conduits which transport abnormally hot material to the surface.

This, the mantle plume theory, became the dominant explanation for apparent volcanic anomalies for the remainder of the 20th century. Testing the hypothesis, however, is beset with difficulties. A central tenet of the plume theory is that the source of melt is significantly hotter than the surrounding mantle, so the most direct test is to measure the source temperature of magmas. This is difficult as the petrogenesis of magmas is extremely complex, rendering inferences from petrology or geochemistry to source temperatures unreliable. Seismic data used to provide additional constraints on source temperatures are highly ambiguous. In addition to this, several predictions of the plume theory have proved unsuccessful at many locations purported to be underlain by mantle plumes, and there are also significant theoretical reasons to doubt the hypothesis.

The foregoing issues have inspired a growing number of geoscientists, led by American geophysicist Don L. Anderson and British geophysicist Gillian R. Foulger, to pursue other explanations for volcanic activity not easily accounted for by plate tectonics. Rather than introducing another extraneous theory, these explanations essentially expand the scope of plate tectonics in ways that can accommodate volcanic activity previously thought to be outside its remit. The key modification to the basic plate-tectonic model here is a relaxation of the assumption that plates are rigid. This implies that lithospheric extension occurs not only at spreading plate boundaries but throughout plate interiors, a phenomenon that is well supported both theoretically and empirically.

Over the last two decades, the plate theory has developed into a cohesive research programme, attracting many adherents, and occupying researchers in several subdisciplines of Earth science. It has also been the focus of several international conferences and many peer-reviewed papers and is the subject of two major Geological Society of America edited volumes and a textbook.

Since 2003, discussion and development of the plate theory has been fostered by the Durham University(UK)-hosted website mantleplumes.org, a major international forum with contributions from geoscientists working in a wide variety of specialties.

==== Lithospheric extension ====
Global-scale lithospheric extension is a necessary consequence of the non-closure of plate motion circuits and is equivalent to an additional slow-spreading boundary. Extension results principally from the following three processes.

1. Changes in the configuration of plate boundaries. These can result from various processes including the formation or annihilation of plates and boundaries and slab rollback (vertical sinking of subducting slabs causing oceanward migration of trenches).
2. Vertical motions resulting from delamination of the lower crust and mantle lithosphere and isostatic adjustment following erosion, orogeny, or melting of ice caps.
3. Thermal contraction, which sums to the largest amount across large plates such as the Pacific.

Extension resulting from these processes manifests in a variety of structures including continental rift zones (e.g., the East African Rift), diffuse oceanic plate boundaries (e.g., Iceland), continental back-arc extensional regions (e.g., the Basin and Range Province in the Western United States), oceanic back-arc basins (e.g., the Manus Basin in the Bismarck Sea off Papua New Guinea), fore-arc regions (e.g., the western Pacific), and continental regions undergoing lithospheric delamination (e.g., New Zealand).

Continental breakup begins with rifting. When extension is persistent and entirely compensated by magma from asthenospheric upwelling, oceanic crust is formed, and the rift becomes a spreading plate boundary. If extension is isolated and ephemeral it is classified as intraplate. Rifting can occur in both oceanic and continental crust and ranges from minor to amounts approaching those seen at spreading boundaries. All can give rise to magmatism.

Various extensional styles are seen in the northeast Atlantic. Continental rifting began in the late Paleozoic and was followed by catastrophic destabilisation in the late Cretaceous and early Paleocene. The latter was possibly caused by rollback of the Alpine slab, which generated extension throughout Europe. More severe rifting occurred along the Caledonian Suture, a zone of pre-existing weakness where the Iapetus Ocean closed around 420 Ma. As extension became localised, oceanic crust began to form around 54 Ma, with diffuse extension persisting around Iceland.

Some intracontinental rifts are essentially failed continental breakup axes, and some of these form triple junctions with plate boundaries. The East African Rift, for example, forms a triple junction with the Red Sea and the Gulf of Aden, both of which have progressed to the seafloor spreading stage. Likewise, the Mid-American Rift constitutes two arms of a triple junction along with a third which separated the Amazonian Craton from Laurentia around 1.1 Ga.

Diverse volcanic activity resulting from lithospheric extension has occurred throughout the western United States. The Cascade Volcanoes are a back-arc volcanic chain extending from British Columbia to Northern California. Back-arc extension continues to the east in the Basin and Range Province, with small-scale volcanism distributed throughout the region.

The Pacific Plate is the largest tectonic plate on Earth, covering about one third of Earth's surface. It undergoes considerable extension and shear deformation due to thermal contraction of the lithosphere. Shear deformation is greatest in the area between Samoa and the Easter Microplate, an area replete with volcanic provinces such as the Cook-Austral chain, the Marquesas and Society Islands, the Tuamotu Archipelago, the Fuca and Pukapuka ridges and Pitcairn Island.

==== Magma source ====
The volume of magma that is intruded and/or erupted in a given area of lithospheric extension depends on two variables: (1) the availability of pre-existing melt in the crust and mantle; and (2) the amount of additional melt supplied by decompression upwelling. The latter depends on three factors: (a) lithospheric thickness; (b) the amount of extension; and (c) fusibility and temperature of the source.

There is abundant pre-existing melt throughout both the crust and the mantle. In the crust, melt is stored under active volcanoes in shallow reservoirs which are fed by deeper ones. In the asthenosphere, a small amount of partial melt is thought to provide a weak layer that acts as lubrication for the movement of tectonic plates. The presence of pre-existing melt means that magmatism can occur even in areas where lithospheric extension is modest such as the Cameroon and Pitcairn-Gambier volcanic lines.

The rate of magma formation from decompression of the asthenosphere depends on how high the asthenosphere can rise, which in turn depends on the thickness of the lithosphere. From numerical modelling it is evident that the formation of melt in the largest flood basalts cannot be concurrent with its emplacement. This means that melt is formed over a longer period, stored in reservoirs – most likely located at the lithosphere-asthenosphere boundary – and released by lithospheric extension. That large volumes of magma are stored at the base of the lithosphere is evinced in observations of large magmatic provinces such as the Great Dyke in Zimbabwe and the Bushveld Igneous Complex in South Africa. There, thick lithosphere remained intact during large-volume magmatism, so decompression upwelling on the scale required can be ruled out, implying that large volumes of magma must have pre-existed.

If extension is severe and results in significant thinning of the lithosphere, the asthenosphere can rise to shallow depths, inducing decompression melting and producing larger volumes of melt. At mid-ocean ridges, where the lithosphere is thin, decompression upwelling produces a modest rate of magmatism. The same process can also produce small-volume magmatism on or near slowly extending continental rifts. Beneath continents, the lithosphere is up to 200 km thick. If lithosphere this thick undergoes severe and persistent extension, it can rupture, and the asthenosphere can upwell to the surface, producing tens of millions of cubic kilometres of melt along axes hundreds of kilometres long. This occurred, for example, during the opening of the North Atlantic Ocean when the asthenosphere rose from base of the Pangaean lithosphere to the surface.

==== Examples ====
The vast majority of volcanic provinces which are thought to be anomalous in the context of rigid plate tectonics have now been explained using the plate theory. The type examples of this kind of volcanic activity are Iceland, Yellowstone, and Hawaii. Iceland is the type example of a volcanic anomaly situated on a plate boundary. Yellowstone, together with the Eastern Snake River Plain to its west, is the type example of an intra-continental volcanic anomaly. Hawaii, along with the related Hawaiian-Emperor seamount chain, is the type example of an intra-oceanic volcanic anomaly.

===== Iceland =====
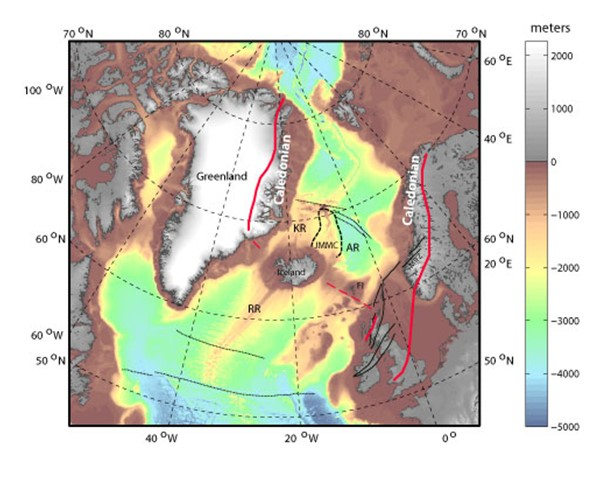
Regional map of the North East Atlantic. Bathymetry shown in colour; land topography in grey. RR: Reykjanes Ridge; KR: Kolbeinsey Ridge; JMMC: Jan Mayen Microcontinent; AR: Aegir Ridge; FI: Faroe Islands. Red lines: boundaries of the Caledonian orogen and associated thrusts, dashed where extrapolated into younger Atlantic Ocean.

Iceland is a 1 km high, 450x300 km basaltic shield on the mid-ocean ridge in the northeast Atlantic Ocean. It comprises over 100 active or extinct volcanoes and has been extensively studied by Earth scientists for several decades.

Iceland must be understood in the context of the broader structure and tectonic history of the northeast Atlantic. The northeast Atlantic formed in the early Cenozoic when, after an extensive period of rifting, Greenland separated from Eurasia as Pangaea began to break up. To the north of Iceland's present location, the breakup axis propagated south along the Caledonian Suture. To the south, the breakup axis propagated north. The two axes were separated by around 100 km from east to west and 300 km from north to south. When the two axes developed to full seafloor spreading, the 100x300 km continental region between the two rifts formed the Iceland microcontinent which underwent diffuse extension and shear along several north-oriented rift axes, and basaltic lavas were emplaced in and on the stretched continental crust. This style of extension persists across parallel rift zones which frequently become extinct and are replaced with new ones.

This model explains several distinct characteristics of the region:

1. Persistence of a subaerial land-bridge from Greenland to the Faroe Islands which was broken up when the northeast Atlantic was around 1,000 km wide, older parts of which now form a shallow submarine ridge.
2. The instability and decoupling of spreading ridges to the north and south. To the north, the Aegir Ridge became extinct around 31-28 Ma and extension transferred to the Kolbeinsey Ridge around 400 km to the west. In the Reykjanes Ridge to the south, after around 16 million years of spreading perpendicular to the ridge strike, the direction of extension changed, and the ridge became a ridge-transform system which later migrated eastward.
3. Properties of the crust beneath the Greenland-Iceland-Faroe Ridge. Here the crust is mostly 30–40 km thick. Its combination of low seismic wave speed and high density defy classification as thick oceanic crust and indicate instead that it is magma-inflated continental crust. This suggests that Iceland is the result of persistent extension of continental crust which was structurally resistant to continued propagation of the new oceanic ridges. As a result, continental extension continued for an exceptionally long period and has not yet given way to true ocean spreading. Melt production is similar to the adjacent mid-ocean ridges which produces oceanic crust around 10 km thick, though under Iceland, rather than forming oceanic crust, melt is emplaced into and on top of stretched continental crust.
4. Iceland's unusual petrology and geochemistry, which is around 10% silicic and intermediate, with geochemistry similar to such flood basalts as Karoo and Deccan which have undergone silicic assimilation of, or contamination by, continental crust.

===== Yellowstone =====
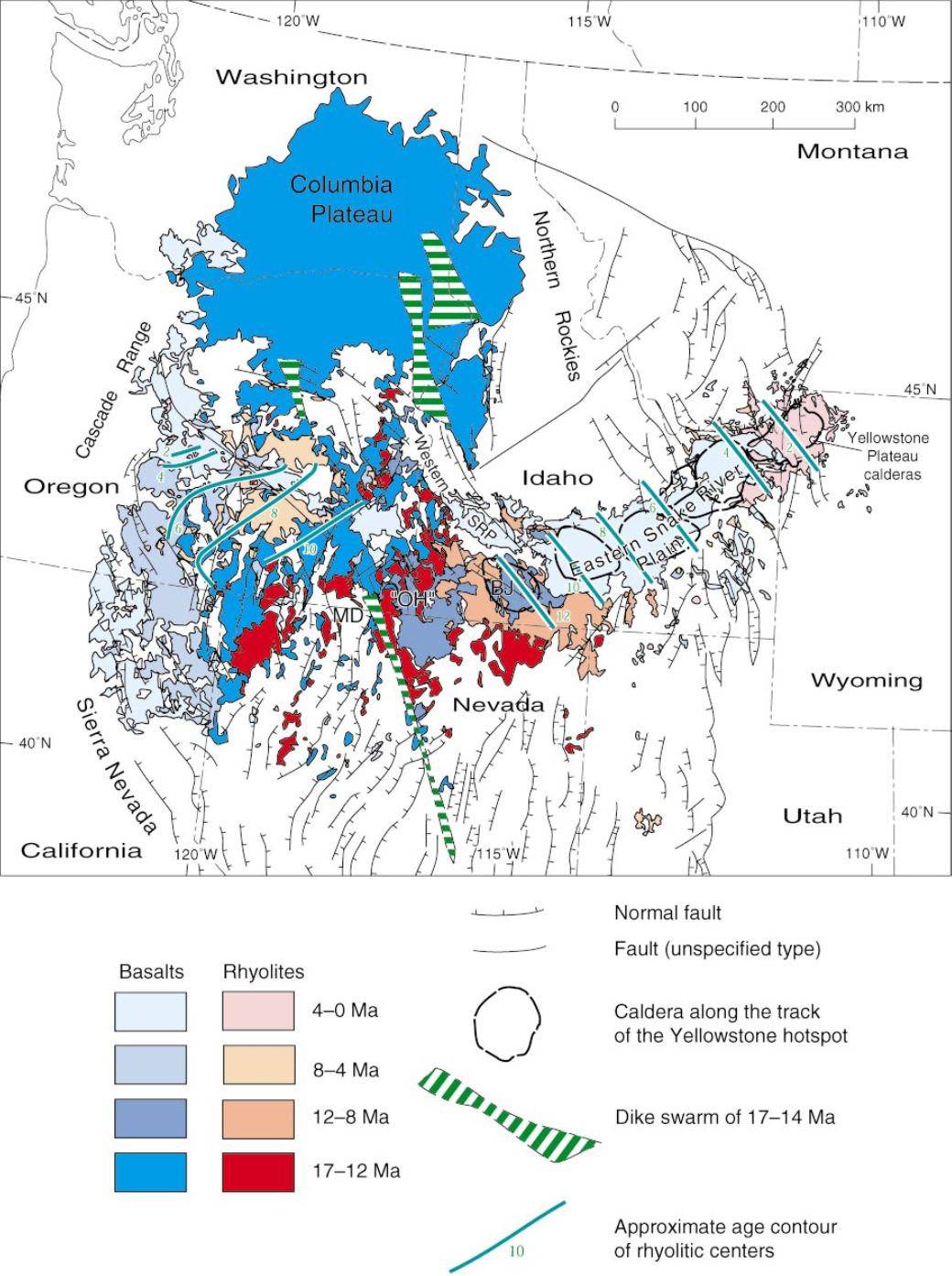
Geological map of northwest USA showing Basin and Range faults and basalts and rhyolites <17 Ma. Blue lines represent approximate age contours of silicic volcanic centres across the Eastern Snake River Plain and a contemporaneous trend of oppositely propagating silicic volcanism across central Oregon.

Yellowstone and the Eastern Snake River Plain to the west comprise a belt of large, silicic caldera volcanoes that get progressively younger to the east, culminating in the currently active Yellowstone Caldera in northwest Wyoming. The belt, however, is covered with basaltic lavas that display no time progression. Being located on a continental interior, it has been studied extensively, though research has consisted largely of seismology and geochemistry aimed at locating sources deep in the mantle. These methods are not suitable for developing a plate theory, which holds that volcanism is associated with processes at shallow depths.

As with Iceland, volcanism in the Yellowstone-Eastern Snake River Plain region must be understood in its broader tectonic context. The tectonic history of the western United States is heavily influenced by the subduction of the East Pacific Rise under the North American Plate beginning around 17 Ma. A change in the plate boundary from subduction to shear induced extension across the western United States. This brought about widespread volcanism, commencing with the Columbia River Basalt Group which erupted through a 250-km-long zone of dikes that broadened the crust by several kilometres. The Basin and Range province then formed via normal faulting, producing scattered volcanism with especially abundant eruptions in three east–west zones: the Yellowstone-Eastern Snake River Plain, Valles, and St. George volcanic zones. Compared with the others, the Yellowstone-Eastern Snake River Plain zone is considered unusual because of its time-progressive silicic volcano chain and striking geothermal features.

The volcanoes’ silicic composition indicates a lower crustal source. If volcanism resulted from lithospheric extension, then extension along the Yellowstone-Eastern Snake River Plain zone must have migrated from west to east during the last 17 million years. There is evidence that this is the case. Accelerated motion on nearby normal faults, which indicates extension in the Basin and Range province, migrates east coincidentally with migration of the silicic volcanism. This is corroborated by measurements of recent deformation from GPS surveying, which finds the most intense zones of extension in the Basin and Range province in the far east and far west and little extension in the central 500 km. The Yellowstone-Eastern Snake River Plain zone, therefore, likely reflects a locus of extension that has migrated from west to east. This is further supported by analogous extension-driven silicic magmatism elsewhere in the Western United States, for example in the Coso Hot Springs and Long Valley Caldera in California.

That persistent basaltic volcanism results from simultaneous extension along the entire length of the Yellowstone-Eastern Snake River Plain zone is evident in GPS measurements recorded between 1987 and 2003, which record extension to both the north and south of the zone. Evidence of historic extension can be found in northwest-oriented dike-fed rift zones responsible for basalt flows. Analogy with similar volcanic activity in Iceland and on mid-ocean ridges indicates that periods of extension are brief and thus that basaltic volcanism along the Yellowstone-Eastern Snake River Plain zone occurs in short bursts of activity in between long inactive periods.

===== Hawaii =====
The Hawaii-Emperor volcanic system is notoriously difficult to study. It is thousands of kilometres from any major continental landmass and surrounded by deep ocean, very little of it is above sea level, and it is covered in thick basalt which obscures its deeper structure. It is situated within the Cretaceous Magnetic Quiet Zone, a relatively long period of normal polarity in the Earth's magnetic field, so age variations in the lithosphere are difficult to determine with accuracy. Reconstructing the tectonic history of the Pacific Ocean more generally is problematic because earlier plates and plate boundaries, including the spreading ridge where the Emperor chain began, have been subducted. Because of these issues, geoscientists are yet to produce a fully developed theory of the system's origins which can be positively tested.

Observations that must be accounted for by any such theory include:

1. Hawaii's position in almost the exact geometric centre of the Pacific Plate, that is, at the middle point of a line dividing the western Pacific which is surrounded mainly by subduction zones and the eastern Pacific which is surrounded mainly by spreading ridges.
2. The increasing volume of melt. Over the last 50 million years, the rate of melt production has increased from a mere 0.001 km^{3} per year to 0.25 km^{3} per year, a factor of around 250. The current rate of magmatism responsible for the formation of the Big Island has been in operation for only 2 million years.
3. Non-movement of the volcanic centre relative to both the geomagnetic pole and geometry of the Pacific Plate for around 50 million years.
4. Continuity of the Hawaiian chain with the Emperor chain via a 60° “bend”. The latter formed over a 30-million-year period during which the volcanic centre migrated south-southeast. Migration ceased at the beginning of the Hawaiian chain. The 60° bend cannot be accounted for by a change in plate direction because no such change occurred.

The lack of any regional heatflow anomaly detected around the extinct islands and seamounts indicates that the volcanoes are local thermal features. According to the plate theory, the Hawaiian-Emperor system formed at a region of extension in the Pacific Plate. Extension in the plate is a consequence of deformation at plate boundaries, thermal contraction, and isostatic adjustment. Extension originated at a spreading ridge around 80 Ma. The plate's stress field evolved over the next 30 million years, causing the region of extension and consequent volcanism to migrate south-southeast. Around 50 Ma, the stress field stabilised and the region of extension became almost stationary. At the same time, the north-westerly motion of the Pacific Plate increased, and over the next 50 million years, the Hawaiian chain formed as the plate moved across a near-stationary region of extension.

The increasing rate of volcanic activity in the Hawaiian-Emperor system reflects the availability of melt in the crust and mantle. The oldest volcanoes in the Emperor chain formed on young, and therefore thin, oceanic lithosphere. The size of the seamounts increases with the age of the seafloor, indicating that the availability of melt increases with the thickness of the lithosphere. This suggests that decompression melting may contribute, as this, too, is expected to increase with lithospheric thickness. The significant increase in magmatism during the last 2 million years indicates a major increase in melt availability, implying that either a larger reservoir of pre-existing melt or an exceptionally fusible source region has become available. Petrological and geochemical evidence suggests that this source may be old metamorphosed oceanic crust in the asthenosphere, highly fusible material which would produce far greater magma volumes than mantle rocks.

=== The impact hypothesis ===
In addition to these processes, impact events such as ones that created the Addams crater on Venus and the Sudbury Igneous Complex in Canada are known to have caused melting and volcanism. In the impact hypothesis, it is proposed that some regions of hotspot volcanism can be triggered by certain large-body oceanic impacts which are able to penetrate the thinner oceanic lithosphere, and flood basalt volcanism can be triggered by converging seismic energy focused at the antipodal point opposite major impact sites. Impact-induced volcanism has not been adequately studied and comprises a separate causal category of terrestrial volcanism with implications for the study of hotspots and plate tectonics.

=== Comparison of the hypotheses ===
In 1997 it became possible using seismic tomography to image submerging tectonic slabs penetrating from the surface all the way to the core-mantle boundary.

For the Hawaii hotspot, long-period seismic body wave diffraction tomography provided evidence that a mantle plume is responsible, as had been proposed as early as 1971. For the Yellowstone hotspot, seismological evidence began to converge from 2011 in support of the plume model, as concluded by James et al., "we favor a lower mantle plume as the origin for the Yellowstone hotspot." Data acquired through Earthscope, a program collecting high-resolution seismic data throughout the contiguous United States has accelerated acceptance of a plume underlying Yellowstone.

Although there is strong evidence that at least two deep mantle plumes rise to the core-mantle boundary, confirmation that other hypotheses can be dismissed may require similar tomographic evidence for other hot spots.

== See also ==
- Anorogenic magmatism – Geologic mechanism
- Delamination (geology) – Loss of lithosphere from a tectonic plate
- Epeirogenic movement – Upheavals or depressions of land exhibiting long wavelengths and little folding
- Orogeny – Formation of mountain ranges
- Verneshot – Hypothetical volcanic eruption caused by buildup of gas under a craton
