= Mantle plume =

Upwelling of abnormally hot rock within Earth's mantle

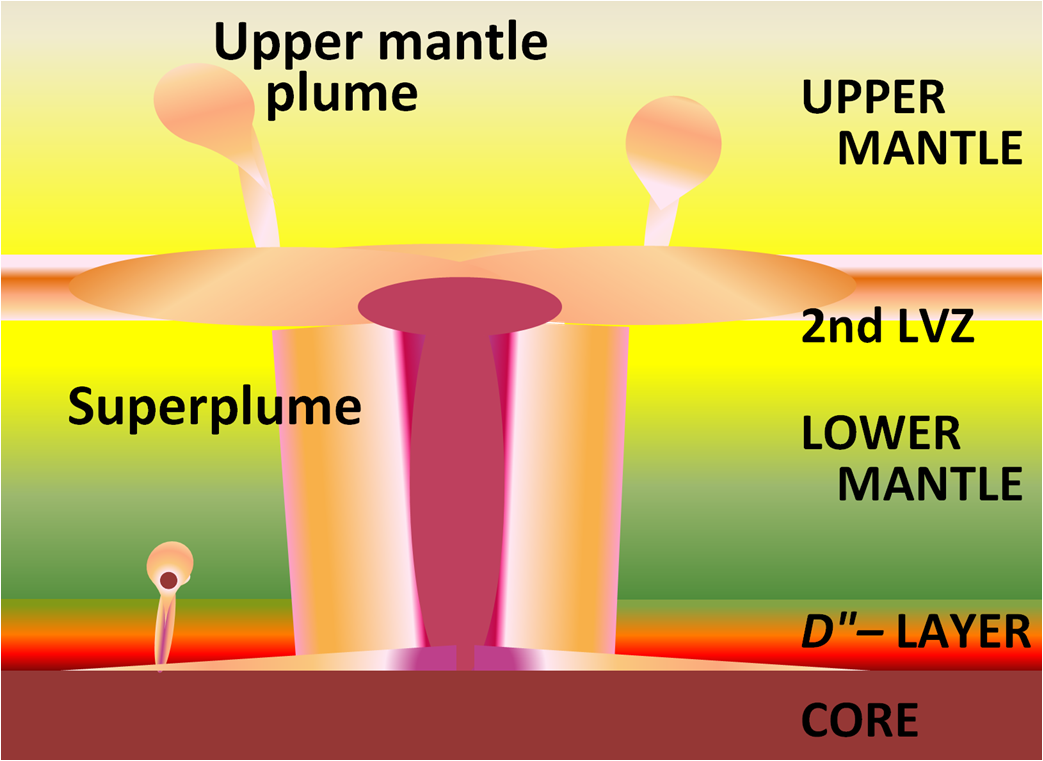
A superplume generated by cooling processes in the mantle (LVZ = low-velocity zone)

A mantle plume is a proposed mechanism of convection within the Earth's mantle, hypothesized to explain anomalous volcanism. Because the plume head partially melts on reaching shallow depths, a plume is often invoked as the cause of volcanic hotspots, such as Hawaii or Iceland, and large igneous provinces such as the Deccan and Siberian Traps. Some such volcanic regions lie far from tectonic plate boundaries, while others represent unusually large-volume volcanism near plate boundaries.

== Concepts ==
Mantle plumes were first proposed by J. Tuzo Wilson in 1963 and further developed by W. Jason Morgan in 1971 and 1972. A mantle plume is posited to exist where super-heated material forms (nucleates) at the core-mantle boundary and rises through the Earth's mantle. Rather than a continuous stream, plumes should be viewed as a series of hot bubbles of material. Reaching the brittle upper Earth's crust they form diapirs. These diapirs are "hotspots" in the crust. In particular, the concept that mantle plumes are fixed relative to one another and anchored at the core-mantle boundary would provide a natural explanation for the time-progressive chains of older volcanoes seen extending out from some such hotspots, for example, the Hawaiian–Emperor seamount chain. However, paleomagnetic data show that mantle plumes can also be associated with Large Low Shear Velocity Provinces (LLSVPs) and do move relative to each other.

The current mantle plume theory is that material and energy from Earth's interior are exchanged with the surface crust in two distinct and largely independent convective flows:

- as previously theorized and widely accepted, the predominant, steady state plate tectonic regime driven by upper mantle convection, mainly the sinking of cold plates of lithosphere back into the asthenosphere.
- the punctuated, intermittently dominant mantle overturn regime driven by plume convection that carries heat upward from the core-mantle boundary in a narrow column. This second regime, while often discontinuous, is periodically significant in mountain building and continental breakup.

The plume hypothesis was simulated by laboratory experiments in small fluid-filled tanks in the early 1970s. Thermal or compositional fluid-dynamical plumes produced in that way were presented as models for the much larger postulated mantle plumes. Based on these experiments, mantle plumes are now postulated to comprise two parts: a long thin conduit connecting the top of the plume to its base, and a bulbous head that expands in size as the plume rises. The entire structure resembles a mushroom. The bulbous head of thermal plumes forms because hot material moves upward through the conduit faster than the plume itself rises through its surroundings. In the late 1980s and early 1990s, experiments with thermal models showed that as the bulbous head expands it may entrain some of the adjacent mantle into itself.

The size and occurrence of mushroom mantle plumes can be predicted by the transient instability theory of Tan and Thorpe. The theory predicts mushroom-shaped mantle plumes with heads of about 2000 km diameter that have a critical time (time from onset of heating of the lower mantle to formation of a plume) of about 830 million years for a core mantle heat flux of 20 mW/m^{2}, while the cycle time (the time between plume formation events) is about 2000 million years. The number of mantle plumes is predicted to be about 17.

When a plume head encounters the base of the lithosphere, it is expected to flatten out against this barrier and to undergo widespread decompression melting to form large volumes of basalt magma. It may then erupt onto the surface. Numerical modelling predicts that melting and eruption will take place over several million years. These eruptions have been linked to flood basalts, although many of those erupt over much shorter time scales (less than 1 million years). Examples include the Deccan Traps in India, the Siberian Traps of Asia, the Karoo-Ferrar basalts/dolerites in South Africa and Antarctica, the Paraná and Etendeka traps in South America and Africa (formerly a single province separated by opening of the South Atlantic Ocean), and the Columbia River basalts of North America. Flood basalts in the oceans are known as oceanic plateaus, and include the Ontong Java Plateau of the western Pacific Ocean and the Kerguelen Plateau of the Indian Ocean.

The narrow vertical conduit, postulated to connect the plume head to the core-mantle boundary, is viewed as providing a continuous supply of magma to a hotspot. As the overlying tectonic plate moves over this hotspot, the eruption of magma from the fixed plume onto the surface is expected to form a chain of volcanoes that parallels plate motion. The Hawaiian Islands chain in the Pacific Ocean is the archetypal example. It has recently been discovered that the volcanic locus of this chain has not been fixed over time, and it thus joined the club of the many type examples that do not exhibit the key characteristic originally proposed.

The eruption of continental flood basalts is often associated with continental rifting and breakup. This has led to the hypothesis that mantle plumes contribute to continental rifting and the formation of ocean basins.

=== Chemistry, heat flow and melting ===
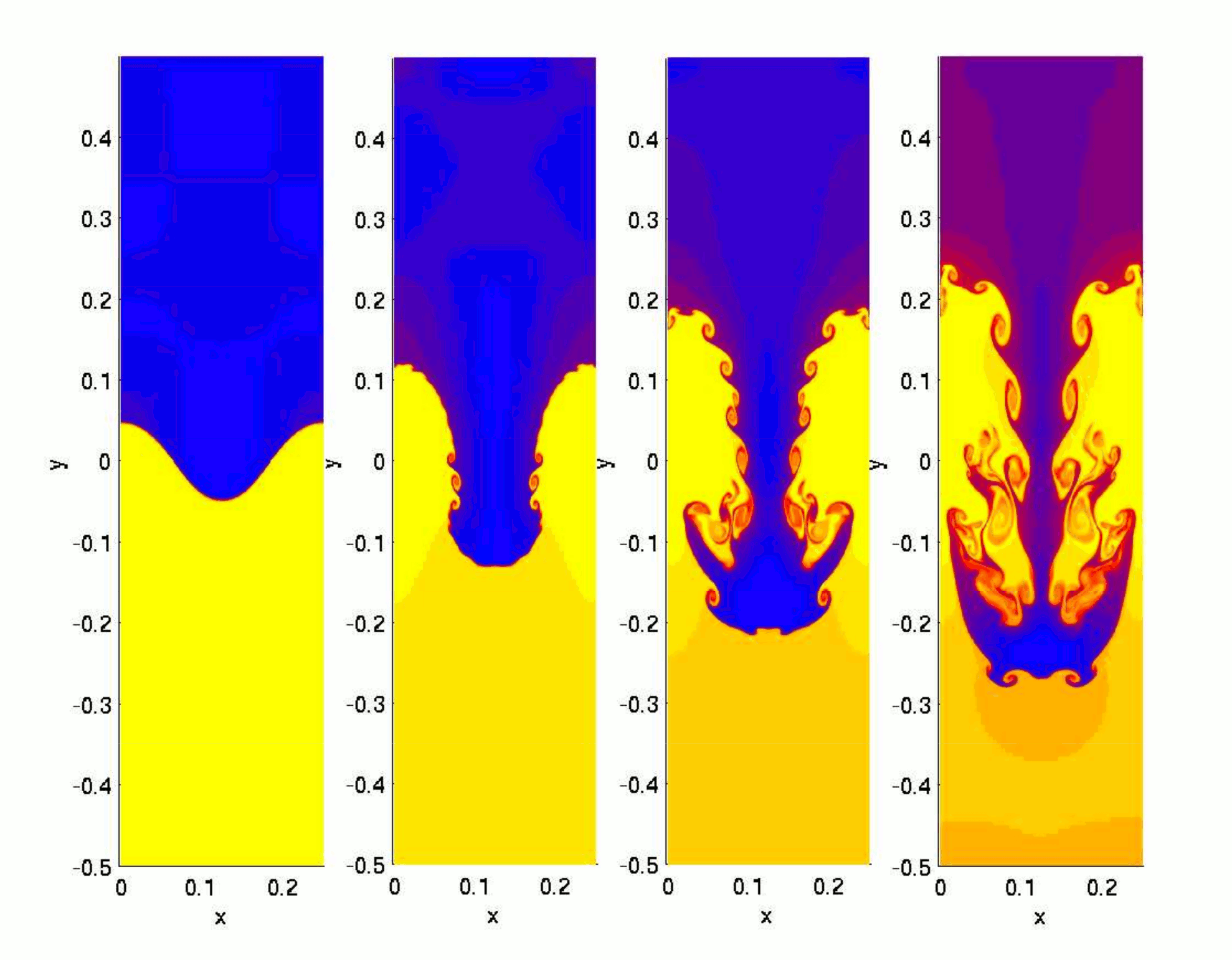
Hydrodynamic simulation of a single "finger" of the Rayleigh–Taylor instability, a possible mechanism for plume formation. In the third and fourth frame in the sequence, the plume forms a "mushroom cap". Note that the core is at the top of the diagram and the crust is at the bottom.

Earth cross-section showing location of upper (3) and lower (5) mantle, D″-layer (6), and outer (7) and inner (9) core

The chemical and isotopic composition of basalts found at hotspots differs subtly from mid-ocean-ridge basalts. These basalts, also called ocean island basalts (OIBs), are analysed in their radiogenic and stable isotope compositions. In radiogenic isotope systems the originally subducted material creates diverging trends, termed mantle components. Identified mantle components are DMM (depleted mid-ocean ridge basalt (MORB) mantle), HIMU (high U/Pb-ratio mantle), EM1 (enriched mantle 1), EM2 (enriched mantle 2) and FOZO (focus zone). This geochemical signature arises from the mixing of near-surface materials such as subducted slabs and continental sediments, in the mantle source. There are two competing interpretations for this. In the context of mantle plumes, the near-surface material is postulated to have been transported down to the core-mantle boundary by subducting slabs, and to have been transported back up to the surface by plumes. In the context of the Plate hypothesis, subducted material is mostly re-circulated in the shallow mantle and tapped from there by volcanoes.

Stable isotopes like Fe are used to track processes that the uprising material experiences during melting.

The processing of oceanic crust, lithosphere, and sediment through a subduction zone decouples the water-soluble trace elements (e.g., K, Rb, Th) from the immobile trace elements (e.g., Ti, Nb, Ta), concentrating the immobile elements in the oceanic slab (the water-soluble elements are added to the crust in island arc volcanoes). Seismic tomography shows that subducted oceanic slabs sink as far as the bottom of the mantle transition zone at 650 km depth. Subduction to greater depths is less certain, but there is evidence that they may sink to mid-lower-mantle depths at about 1,500 km depth.

The source of mantle plumes is postulated to be the core-mantle boundary at 3,000 km depth. Because there is little material transport across the core-mantle boundary, heat transfer must occur by conduction, with adiabatic gradients above and below this boundary. The core-mantle boundary is a strong thermal (temperature) discontinuity. The temperature of the core is approximately 1,000 degrees Celsius higher than that of the overlying mantle. Plumes are postulated to rise as the base of the mantle becomes hotter and more buoyant.

Plumes are postulated to rise through the mantle and begin to partially melt on reaching shallow depths in the asthenosphere by decompression melting. This would create large volumes of magma. This melt rises to the surface and erupts to form hotspots.

== The lower mantle and the core ==
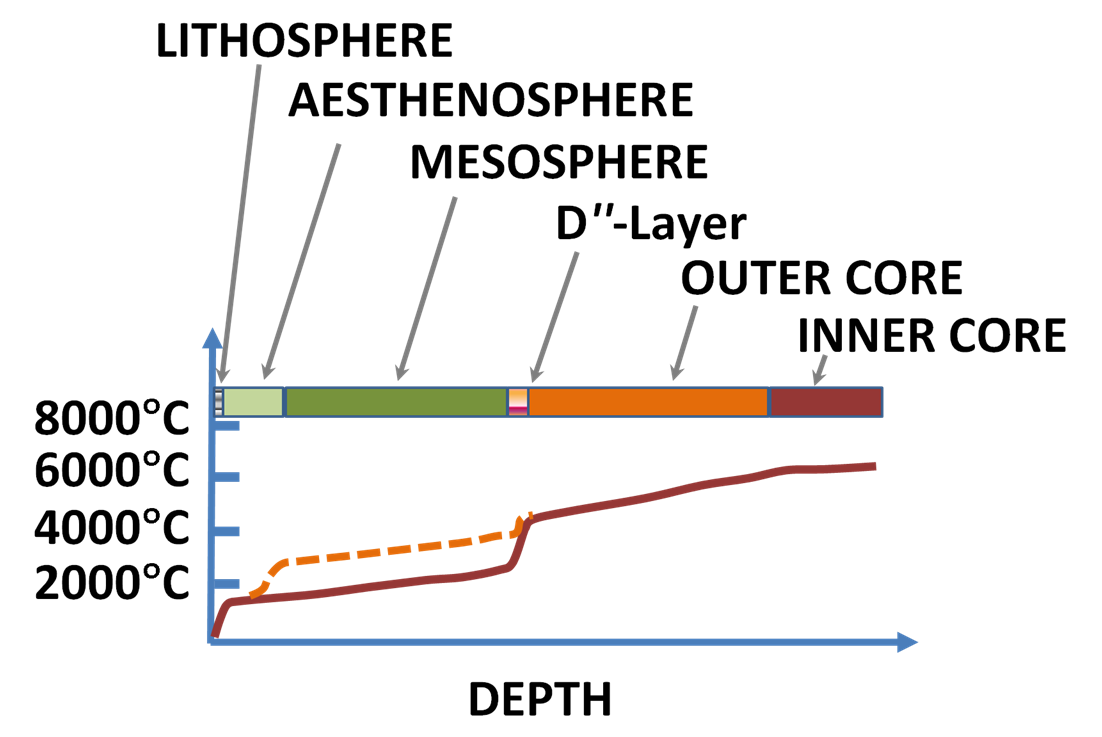
Calculated Earth's temperature vs. depth. Dashed curve: Layered mantle convection; Solid curve: Whole mantle convection.

The most prominent thermal contrast known to exist in the deep (1000 km) mantle is at the core-mantle boundary at 2900 km. Mantle plumes were originally postulated to rise from this layer because the hotspots that are assumed to be their surface expression were thought to be fixed relative to one another. This required that plumes were sourced from beneath the shallow asthenosphere that is thought to be flowing rapidly in response to motion of the overlying tectonic plates. There is no other known major thermal boundary layer in the deep Earth, and so the core-mantle boundary was the only candidate.

The base of the mantle is known as the D″ layer, a seismological subdivision of the Earth. It appears to be compositionally distinct from the overlying mantle and may contain partial melt.

Two very broad, large low-shear-velocity provinces exist in the lower mantle under Africa and under the central Pacific. It is postulated that plumes rise from their surface or their edges. Their low seismic velocities were thought to suggest that they are relatively hot, although it has recently been shown that their low wave velocities are due to high density caused by chemical heterogeneity.

== Evidence for the theory ==
Some common and basic lines of evidence cited in support of the theory are linear volcanic chains, noble gases, geophysical anomalies, and geochemistry.

=== Linear volcanic chains ===
The age-progressive distribution of the Hawaiian-Emperor seamount chain has been explained as a result of a fixed, deep-mantle plume rising into the upper mantle, partly melting, and causing a volcanic chain to form as the plate moves overhead relative to the fixed plume source. Other hotspots with time-progressive volcanic chains behind them include Réunion, the Chagos-Laccadive Ridge, the Louisville Ridge, the Ninety East Ridge and Kerguelen, Tristan, and Yellowstone.

While there is evidence that the chains listed above are time-progressive, it has been shown that they are not fixed relative to one another. The most remarkable example of this is the Emperor chain, the older part of the Hawaii system, which was formed by migration of the hotspot in addition to the plate motion. Another example is the Canary Islands in the northeast of Africa in the Atlantic Ocean.

=== Noble gas and other isotopes ===
Helium-3 is a primordial isotope that formed in the Big Bang. Very little is produced, and little has been added to the Earth by other processes since then. Helium-4 includes a primordial component, but it is also produced by the natural radioactive decay of elements such as uranium and thorium. Over time, helium in the upper atmosphere is lost into space. Thus, the Earth has become progressively depleted in helium, and ^{3}He is not replaced as ^{4}He is. As a result, the ratio ^{3}He/^{4}He in the Earth has decreased over time.

Unusually high ^{3}He/^{4}He have been observed in some, but not all, hotspots. This is explained by plumes tapping a deep, primordial reservoir in the lower mantle, where the original, high ^{3}He/^{4}He ratios have been preserved throughout geologic time.

Other elements, e.g. osmium, have been suggested to be tracers of material arising from near to the Earth's core, in basalts at oceanic islands. However, so far conclusive proof for this is lacking.

=== Geophysical anomalies ===
Diagram showing a cross section though the Earth's lithosphere (in yellow) with magma rising from the mantle (in red). The crust may move relative to the plume, creating a track.

The plume hypothesis has been tested by looking for the geophysical anomalies predicted to be associated with them. These include thermal, seismic, and elevation anomalies. Thermal anomalies are inherent in the term "hotspot". They can be measured in numerous different ways, including surface heat flow, petrology, and seismology. Thermal anomalies produce anomalies in the speeds of seismic waves, but unfortunately so do composition and partial melt. As a result, wave speeds cannot be used simply and directly to measure temperature, but more sophisticated approaches must be taken.

Seismic anomalies are identified by mapping variations in wave speed as seismic waves travel through Earth. A hot mantle plume is predicted to have lower seismic wave speeds compared with similar material at a lower temperature. Mantle material containing a trace of partial melt (e.g., as a result of it having a lower melting point), or being richer in Fe, also has a lower seismic wave speed and those effects are stronger than temperature. Thus, although unusually low wave speeds have been taken to indicate anomalously hot mantle beneath hotspots, this interpretation is ambiguous. The most commonly cited seismic wave-speed images that are used to look for variations in regions where plumes have been proposed come from seismic tomography. This method involves using a network of seismometers to construct three-dimensional images of the variation in seismic wave speed throughout the mantle.

Seismic waves generated by large earthquakes enable structure below the Earth's surface to be determined along the ray path. Seismic waves that have traveled a thousand or more kilometers (also called teleseismic waves) can be used to image large regions of Earth's mantle. They also have limited resolution, however, and only structures at least several hundred kilometers in diameter can be detected.

Seismic tomography images have been cited as evidence for a number of mantle plumes in Earth's mantle. There is, however, vigorous on-going discussion regarding whether the structures imaged are reliably resolved, and whether they correspond to columns of hot, rising rock.

The mantle plume hypothesis predicts that domal topographic uplifts will develop when plume heads impinge on the base of the lithosphere. An uplift of this kind occurred when the North Atlantic Ocean opened about 54 million years ago. Some scientists have linked this to a mantle plume postulated to have caused the breakup of Eurasia and the opening of the North Atlantic, now suggested to underlie Iceland. Current research has shown that the time-history of the uplift is probably much shorter than predicted, however. It is thus not clear how strongly this observation supports the mantle plume hypothesis.

=== Geochemistry ===
Basalts found at oceanic islands are geochemically distinct from mid-ocean ridge basalt (MORB). Ocean island basalt (OIB) is more diverse compositionally than MORB, and the great majority of ocean islands are composed of alkali basalt enriched in sodium and potassium relative to MORB. Larger islands, such as Hawaii or Iceland, are mostly tholeiitic basalt, with alkali basalt limited to late stages of their development, but this tholeiitic basalt is chemically distinct from the tholeiitic basalt of mid-ocean ridges. OIB tends to be more enriched in magnesium, and both alkali and tholeiitic OIB is enriched in trace incompatible elements, with the light rare earth elements showing particular enrichment compared with heavier rare earth elements. Stable isotope ratios of the elements strontium, neodymium, hafnium, lead, and osmium show wide variations relative to MORB, which is attributed to the mixing of at least three mantle components: HIMU with a high proportion of radiogenic lead, produced by decay of uranium and other heavy radioactive elements; EM1 with less enrichment of radiogenic lead; and EM2 with a high ^{87}Sr/^{86}Sr ratio. Helium in OIB shows a wider variation in the ^{3}He/^{4}He ratio than MORB, with some values approaching the primordial value.

The composition of ocean island basalts is attributed to the presence of distinct mantle chemical reservoirs formed by subduction of oceanic crust. These include reservoirs corresponding to HUIMU, EM1, and EM2. These reservoirs are thought to have different major element compositions, based on the correlation between major element compositions of OIB and their stable isotope ratios. Tholeiitic OIB is interpreted as a product of a higher degree of partial melting in particularly hot plumes, while alkali OIB is interpreted as a product of a lower degree of partial melting in smaller, cooler plumes.

=== Seismology ===
In 2015, based on data from 273 large earthquakes, researchers compiled a model based on full waveform tomography, requiring the equivalent of 3 million hours of supercomputer time. Due to computational limitations, high-frequency data still could not be used, and seismic data remained unavailable from much of the seafloor. Nonetheless, vertical plumes, 400 C hotter than the surrounding rock, were visualized under many hotspots, including the Pitcairn, Macdonald, Samoa, Tahiti, Marquesas, Galapagos, Cape Verde, and Canary hotspots. They extended nearly vertically from the core-mantle boundary (2900 km depth) to a possible layer of shearing and bending at 1000 km. They were detectable because they were 600–800 km wide, more than three times the width expected from contemporary models. Many of these plumes are in the large low-shear-velocity provinces under Africa and the Pacific, while some other hotspots such as Yellowstone were less clearly related to mantle features in the model.

The unexpected size of the plumes leaves open the possibility that they may conduct the bulk of the Earth's 44 terawatts of internal heat flow from the core to the surface, and means that the lower mantle convects less than expected, if at all. It is possible that there is a compositional difference between plumes and the surrounding mantle that slows them down and broadens them.

== Suggested mantle plume locations ==
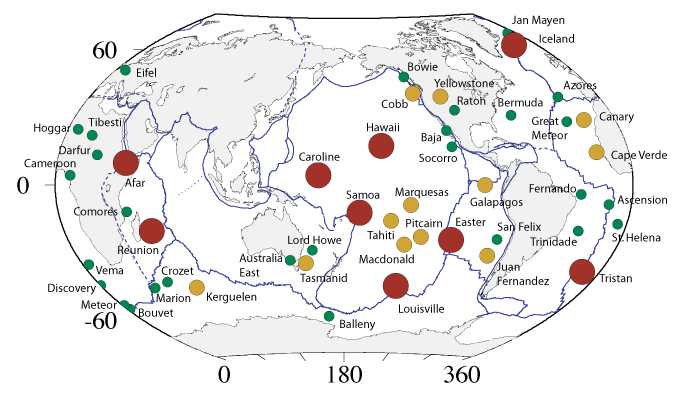
An example of plume locations suggested by one recent group. Figure from Foulger (2010).

Mantle plumes have been suggested as the source for flood basalts. These extremely rapid, large scale eruptions of basaltic magmas have periodically formed continental flood basalt provinces on land and oceanic plateaus in the ocean basins, such as the Deccan Traps, the Siberian Traps the Karoo-Ferrar flood basalts of Gondwana, and the largest known continental flood basalt, the Central Atlantic magmatic province (CAMP).

Many continental flood basalt events coincide with continental rifting. This is consistent with a system that tends toward equilibrium: as matter rises in a mantle plume, other material is drawn down into the mantle, causing rifting.

== Alternative hypotheses ==
In parallel with the mantle plume model, two alternative explanations for the observed phenomena have been considered: the plate hypothesis and the impact hypothesis.

=== The plate hypothesis ===
Since the beginning of the 21st century, a paradigm debate "The great plume debate" has developed around plumes, in which the plume hypothesis has been challenged and contrasted with the more recent plate hypothesis ("Plates vs. Plumes"). The reason for this is that the mantle-plume hypothesis has not been suitable for making reliable predictions since its introduction in 1971 and has therefore been repeatedly adapted to observed hotspots depending on the situation. Over time, with the growing number of models, the concept of a plume developed into a weakly defined hypothesis, which as a general term is currently neither provable nor refutable.

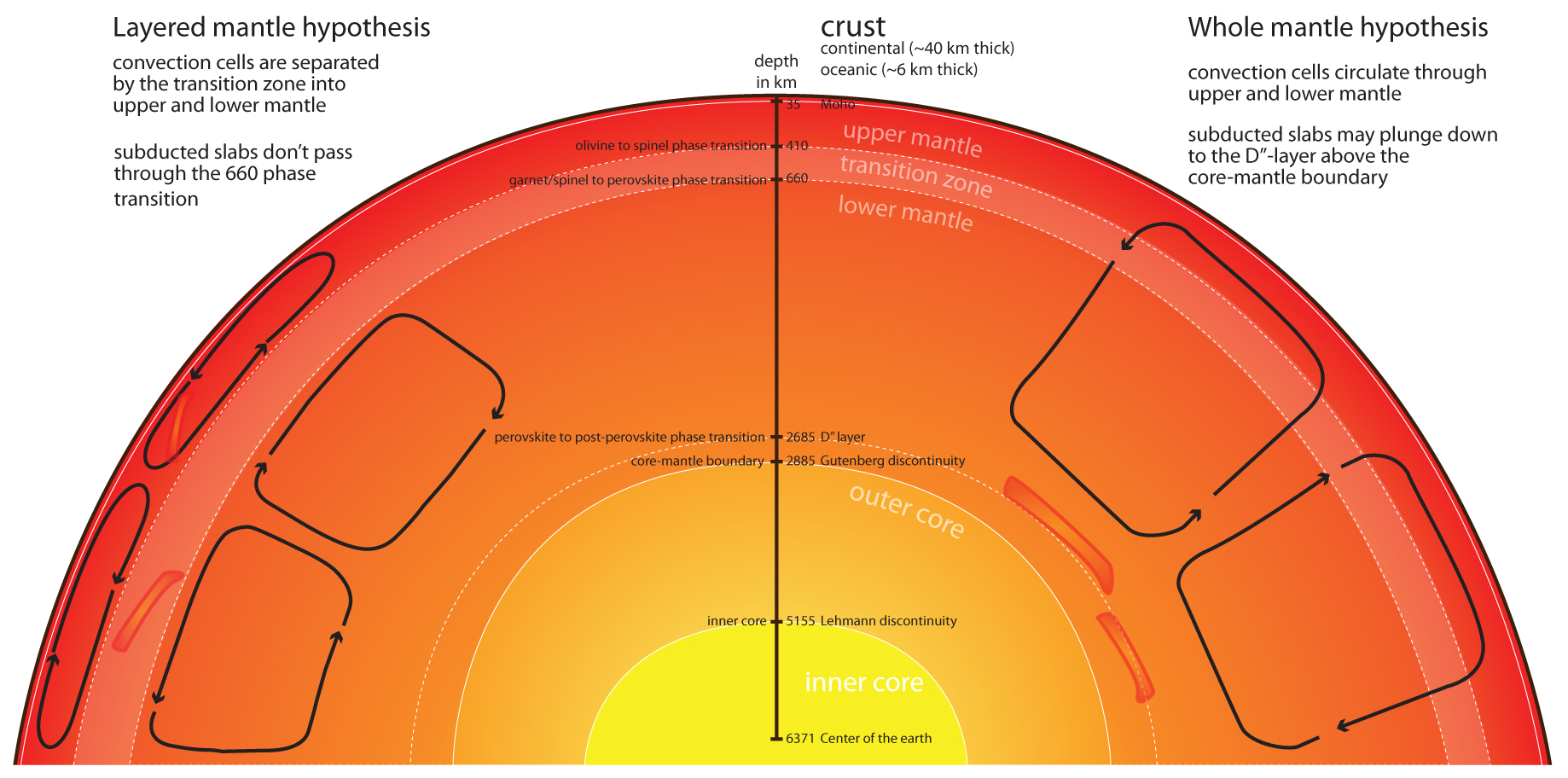
An illustration of competing models of crustal recycling and the fate of subducted slabs. The plume hypothesis invokes deep subduction (right), while the plate hypothesis focuses on shallow subduction (left).

The dissatisfaction with the state of the evidence for mantle plumes and the proliferation of ad hoc hypotheses drove a number of geologists, led by Don L. Anderson, Gillian Foulger, and Warren B. Hamilton, to propose a broad alternative based on shallow processes in the upper mantle and above, with an emphasis on plate tectonics as the driving force of magmatism.

The plate hypothesis suggests that "anomalous" volcanism results from lithospheric extension that permits melt to rise passively from the asthenosphere beneath. It is thus the conceptual inverse of the plume hypothesis because the plate hypothesis attributes volcanism to shallow, near-surface processes associated with plate tectonics, rather than active processes arising at the core-mantle boundary.

Lithospheric extension is attributed to processes related to plate tectonics. These processes are well understood at mid-ocean ridges, where most of Earth's volcanism occurs. It is less commonly recognised that the plates themselves deform internally, and can permit volcanism in those regions where the deformation is extensional. Well-known examples are the Basin and Range Province in the western USA, the East African Rift valley, and the Rhine Graben. Under this hypothesis, variable volumes of magma are attributed to variations in chemical composition (large volumes of volcanism corresponding to more easily molten mantle material) rather than to temperature differences.

While not denying the presence of deep mantle convection and upwelling in general, the plate hypothesis holds that these processes do not result in mantle plumes, in the sense of columnar vertical features that span most of the Earth's mantle, transport large amounts of heat, and contribute to surface volcanism.

Under the umbrella of the plate hypothesis, the following sub-processes, all of which can contribute to permitting surface volcanism, are recognised:

- Continental break-up;
- Fertility at mid-ocean ridges;
- Enhanced volcanism at plate boundary junctions;
- Small-scale sublithospheric convection;
- Oceanic intraplate extension;
- Slab tearing and break-off;
- Shallow mantle convection;
- Abrupt lateral changes in stress at structural discontinuities;
- Continental intraplate extension;
- Catastrophic lithospheric thinning;
- Sublithospheric melt ponding and draining.

=== The impact hypothesis ===
In addition to these processes, impact events such as ones that created the Addams crater on Venus and the Sudbury Igneous Complex in Canada are known to have caused melting and volcanism. In the impact hypothesis, it is proposed that some regions of hotspot volcanism can be triggered by certain large-body oceanic impacts which are able to penetrate the thinner oceanic lithosphere, and flood basalt volcanism can be triggered by converging seismic energy focused at the antipodal point opposite major impact sites. Impact-induced volcanism has not been adequately studied and comprises a separate causal category of terrestrial volcanism with implications for the study of hotspots and plate tectonics.

=== Comparison of the hypotheses ===
In 1997 it became possible using seismic tomography to image submerging tectonic slabs penetrating from the surface all the way to the core-mantle boundary.

For the Hawaii hotspot, long-period seismic body wave diffraction tomography provided evidence that a mantle plume is responsible, as had been proposed as early as 1971. For the Yellowstone hotspot, seismological evidence began to converge from 2011 in support of the plume model, as concluded by James et al., "we favor a lower mantle plume as the origin for the Yellowstone hotspot." Data acquired through Earthscope, a program collecting high-resolution seismic data throughout the contiguous United States has accelerated acceptance of a plume underlying Yellowstone.

Although there is thus strong evidence that at least these two deep mantle plumes rise from the core-mantle boundary, confirmation that other hypotheses can be dismissed may require similar tomographic evidence for other hotspots.

== See also ==
- Delamination (geology) – Loss of lithosphere from a tectonic plate
- Epeirogenic movement – Upheavals or depressions of land exhibiting long wavelengths and little folding
- Orogeny – Formation of mountain ranges
- Verneshot – Hypothetical volcanic eruption caused by buildup of gas under a craton
- Intraplate volcanism – Volcanism away from plate margins
