= LVZ =

The acronym LVZ can stand for:

- Low-velocity zone, in tectonics
- Leipziger Volkszeitung, a daily newspaper in Leipzig, Germany
