= Large low-shear-velocity provinces =

Structures of the Earth's mantle

Animation showing LLSVPs as inferred using seismic tomography

Large low-shear-velocity provinces (LLSVPs), also called large low-velocity provinces (LLVPs) or superplumes, are characteristic structures within the lowermost mantle, above the Earth's outer core. These provinces are characterized by slow shear wave velocities appearing in seismic tomography assays of deep Earth. The two main provinces are the African LLSVP and the Pacific LLSVP, both extending laterally for thousands of kilometers and possibly up to 1,000 kilometers (620 miles) vertically from the core–mantle boundary. These have been named Tuzo and Jason, respectively, after Tuzo Wilson and W. Jason Morgan, two acclaimed geologists in the field of plate tectonics. The Pacific LLSVP (Jason) is 3,000 kilometers (1,900 miles) across and underlies four hotspots on Earth's crust where mantle plumes are believed to reach to the surface. These provinces represent around 8% of the volume of the mantle, or 6% of the entire Earth.

Other names for LLSVPs and their superstructures include superswells, superplumes, thermo-chemical piles, mantle blobs, or hidden reservoirs, mostly describing their proposed geodynamical or geochemical nature. For example, the name "thermo-chemical pile" interprets LLSVPs as lower-mantle piles of thermally hot and/or chemically distinct material. LLSVPs are still relatively mysterious in their nature, origin, and geodynamic effects.

== Seismological modeling ==
Directly above the core–mantle boundary is a 200-kilometer (120 mi) thick layer of the lower mantle known as the D″ ("D double-prime" or "D prime prime"). LLSVPs were discovered in full mantle seismic tomographic models of shear velocity as slow features at the D″ layer beneath Africa and the Pacific. The global spherical harmonics of the D″ layer are uniform throughout most of the mantle but anomalies appear along the two LLSVPs. By using shear wave velocities, the locations of the LLSVPs can be verified, and a stable pattern for mantle convection emerges, driving plate motions at the surface. The African LLSVP might be the cause of the South Atlantic Anomaly, where the Earth's magnetic field is significantly weaker than normal.

The LLSVPs lie near the equator, but mostly in the Southern Hemisphere. Global tomography models inherently detect smooth features; however, additional local waveform modeling of body waves has shown LLSVPs have sharp boundaries. Sharp boundaries make it unlikely that LLSVPs are simply anomalous temperature zones, but rather that they have a distinct mineral composition. Smaller ultra-low velocity zones have been discovered mainly at the edges of LLSVPs.

By using the solid Earth tide, the density of these regions has been determined, with the bottom two thirds 0.5% denser than the bulk of the mantle. However, this cannot determine how the excess mass is distributed; the higher density may be caused by primordial material or subducted ocean slabs.

== Origins ==
Several hypotheses have been proposed for the origin and persistence of LLSVPs. If the provinces represent purely isochemical thermal unconformities (anomalous in temperature but with the same chemical composition as the surrounding mantle), they may have formed as large plumes of hot, upwelling mantle. However, geodynamical studies predict that isochemical upwelling of a hotter, lower viscosity material should produce long, narrow plumes, unlike the large, wide plumes seen in LLSVPs. Nevertheless, it is unclear if these relatively fine scale geodynamical models can be meaningfully compared with the coarse-resolution seismic images.

The current leading hypothesis, however, is that they represent thermochemical unconformities (of different chemical composition from the surrounding mantle), formed from the accumulation of subducted slabs of oceanic crust. They correspond to the locations of known slab graveyards surrounding the Pacific LLSVP, believed to date back before the dispersion of the supercontinent Rodinia 750 million years ago. In this model, the sunken slabs formed the high-velocity-zone anomalies surrounding the Pacific LLSVP; then under the heat and the phase transition at the bottom of the core-mantle boundary, they would melt to form the dense ultra-low-velocity-zone structures fringing the LLSVP. The rest of the material is then carried upwards via chemically induced buoyancy, forming clusters of small plumes right above the core-mantle boundary, which combine to larger plumes and superplumes, eventually rising to the crust and contributing to the basalt in the mid-ocean ridge. The Pacific and African LLSVP, in this scenario, are originally created by a discharge of heat from the core (4000 K) to the much colder mantle (2000 K), induced by the sinking lithosphere. This drives superplume convection, which would cease without continued subduction of lithosphere toward it. This also argues for the existence of radiogenic nuclides within the core to maintain such high temperatures.

Another proposed origin for the LLSVPs is related to the hypothesized giant-impact which formed the Moon after Earth collided with a planet-sized body called Theia. The LLSVPs may represent fragments of Theia's mantle which sank through to Earth's core-mantle boundary. Their higher density is due to Theia's mantle having higher iron(II) oxide content than Earth's mantle: this would be consistent with the isotope geochemistry of lunar samples, as well as that of the ocean island basalts overlying the LLSVPs.

== Dynamics ==
Geodynamic mantle convection models have included compositionally distinctive material. The material tends to get swept up in ridges or piles. When including realistic past plate motions into the modeling, the material gets swept up in locations that are remarkably similar to the present day location of the LLSVPs. These locations also correspond with known slab graveyard locations.

These types of models, as well as the observation that the D″ structure of the LLSVPs is orthogonal to the path of true polar wander, suggest these mantle structures have been stable over large amounts of time. This geometrical relationship is consistent with the position of Pangaea and the formation of the current geoid pattern due to continental break-up from the superswell below.

However, the heat from the core is not enough to sustain the energy needed to fuel the superplumes located at the LLSVPs. There is a phase transition from perovskite to post-perovskite from the down welling slabs that causes an exothermic reaction. This exothermic reaction helps to heat the LLSVP, but it is not sufficient to account for the total energy needed to sustain it. So it is hypothesized that the material from the slab graveyard can become extremely dense and form large pools of melt concentrate enriched in uranium, thorium, and potassium. These concentrated radiogenic elements are thought to provide the high temperatures needed. So, the appearance and disappearance of slab graveyards predicts the birth and death of an LLSVP, potentially changing the dynamics of all plate tectonics.

== Structure and composition ==
A study by researchers from Utrecht University revealed that LLSVPs were not only hotter but also ancient, potentially over a billion years old. The findings suggested that their seismic properties are influenced by factors beyond temperature, such as composition or mineral grain size. Seismic waves passing through LLSVPs decelerate but lose less energy than what would be expected if they were purely thermal in origin, indicating compositional differences and shedding light on their complex structure.

== See also ==
- Low-velocity zone
- Cataclysmic pole shift hypothesis
- Inner core super-rotation
- Intermediate axis theorem
