= Mantle convection =

Gradual movement of the planet's mantle

Simplified model of mantle convection: Whole-mantle convection

Mantle convection is the very slow creep of Earth's solid silicate mantle as convection currents carry heat from the interior to the planet's surface. Mantle convection causes tectonic plates to move around the Earth's surface.

The Earth's lithosphere rides atop the asthenosphere, and the two form the components of the upper mantle. The lithosphere is divided into tectonic plates that are continuously being created or consumed at plate boundaries. Accretion occurs as mantle is added to the growing edges of a plate, associated with seafloor spreading. Upwelling beneath the spreading centers is a shallow, rising component of mantle convection and in most cases not directly linked to the global mantle upwelling. The hot material added at spreading centers cools down by conduction and convection of heat as it moves away from the spreading centers. At the consumption edges of the plate, the material has thermally contracted to become dense, and it sinks under its own weight in the process of subduction usually at an oceanic trench. Subduction is the descending component of mantle convection.

This subducted material sinks through the Earth's interior. Some subducted material appears to reach the lower mantle, while in other regions this material is impeded from sinking further, possibly due to a phase transition from spinel to silicate perovskite and magnesiowustite, an endothermic reaction.

The subducted oceanic crust triggers volcanism, although the basic mechanisms are varied. Volcanism may occur due to processes that add buoyancy to partially melted mantle, which would cause upward flow of the partial melt as it decreases in density. Secondary convection may cause surface volcanism as a consequence of intraplate extension and mantle plumes. In 1993 it was suggested that inhomogeneities in the D" layer have some impact on mantle convection.

== Types of convection ==
Earth cross-section showing location of upper (3) and lower (5) mantle

Earth's temperature vs depth. Dashed curve: layered mantle convection. Solid curve: whole-mantle convection.

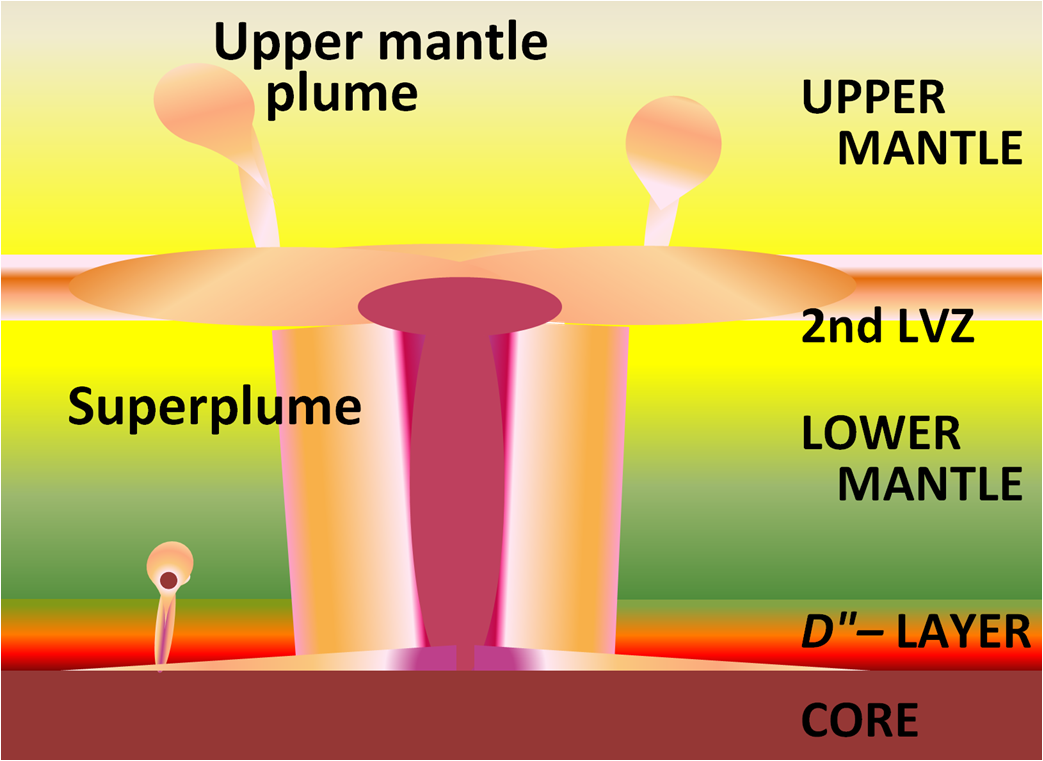
A superplume generated by cooling processes in the mantle.

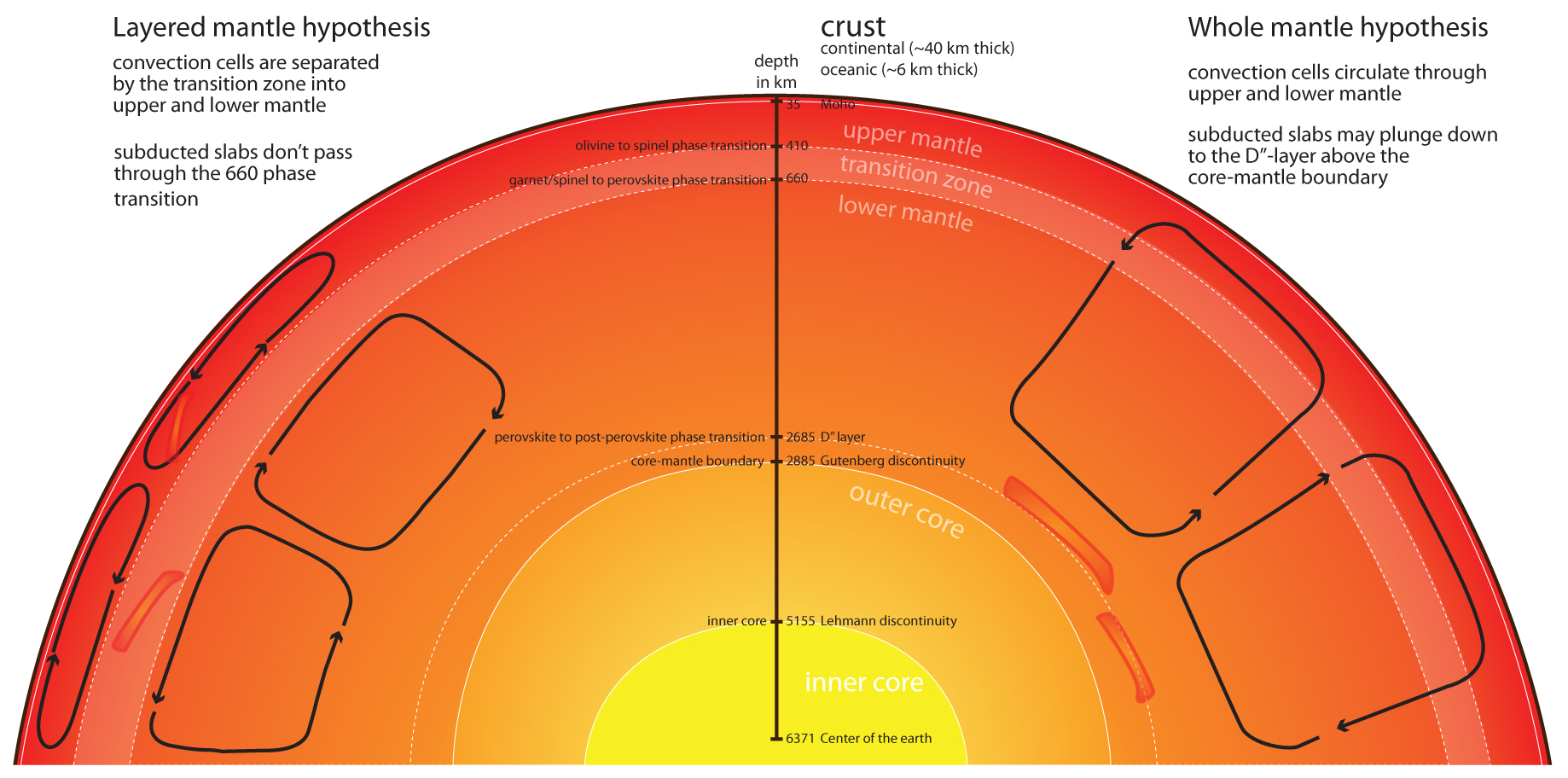
Cross-section diagram of Earth comparing two end-member models of mantle convection

During the late 20th century, there was significant debate within the geophysics community as to whether convection is likely to be "layered" or "whole". Although elements of this debate still continue, results from seismic tomography, numerical simulations of mantle convection and examination of Earth's gravitational field are all beginning to suggest the existence of whole mantle convection, at least at the present time. In this model, cold subducting oceanic lithosphere descends all the way from the surface to the core–mantle boundary (CMB), and hot plumes rise from the CMB all the way to the surface. This model is strongly based on the results of global seismic tomography models, which typically show slab and plume-like anomalies crossing the mantle transition zone.

Although it is accepted that subducting slabs cross the mantle transition zone and descend into the lower mantle, debate about the existence and continuity of plumes persists, with important implications for the style of mantle convection. This debate is linked to the controversy regarding whether intraplate volcanism is caused by shallow, upper mantle processes or by plumes from the lower mantle.

Many geochemistry studies have argued that the lavas erupted in intraplate areas are different in composition from shallow-derived mid-ocean ridge basalts. Specifically, they typically have elevated helium-3 : helium-4 ratios. Being a primordial nuclide, helium-3 is not naturally produced on Earth. It also quickly escapes from Earth's atmosphere when erupted. The elevated He-3:He-4 ratio of ocean island basalts suggest that they must be sourced from a part of the Earth that has not previously been melted and reproduced in the same way as mid-ocean ridge basalts have been. This has been interpreted as their originating from a different less well-mixed region, suggested to be the lower mantle. Others, however, have pointed out that geochemical differences could indicate the inclusion of a small component of near-surface material from the lithosphere.

== Planform and vigour of convection ==
On Earth, the Rayleigh number for convection within Earth's mantle is estimated to be of order 10^{7}, which indicates vigorous convection. This value corresponds to whole mantle convection (i.e. convection extending from the Earth's surface to the border with the core). On a global scale, surface expression of this convection is the tectonic plate motions and therefore has speeds of a few cm per year. Speeds can be faster for small-scale convection occurring in low viscosity regions beneath the lithosphere, and slower in the lowermost mantle where viscosities are larger. A single shallow convection cycle takes on the order of 50 million years, though deeper convection can be closer to 200 million years.

Currently, whole mantle convection is thought to include broad-scale downwelling beneath the Americas and the western Pacific, both regions with a long history of subduction, and upwelling flow beneath the central Pacific and Africa, both of which exhibit dynamic topography consistent with upwelling. This broad-scale pattern of flow is also consistent with the tectonic plate motions, which are the surface expression of convection in the Earth's mantle and currently indicate convergence toward the western Pacific and the Americas, and divergence away from the central Pacific and Africa. The persistence of net tectonic divergence away from Africa and the Pacific for the past 250 myr indicates the long-term stability of this general mantle flow pattern and is consistent with other studies that suggest long-term stability of the large low-shear-velocity provinces of the lowermost mantle that form the base of these upwellings.

== Creep in the mantle ==
Due to the varying temperatures and pressures between the lower and upper mantle, a variety of creep processes can occur, with dislocation creep dominating in the lower mantle and diffusional creep occasionally dominating in the upper mantle. However, there is a large transition region in creep processes between the upper and lower mantle, and even within each section creep properties can change strongly with location and thus temperature and pressure.

Since the upper mantle is primarily composed of olivine ((Mg,Fe)2SiO4), the rheological characteristics of the upper mantle are largely those of olivine. The strength of olivine is proportional to its melting temperature, and is also very sensitive to water and silica content. The solidus depression by impurities, primarily Ca, Al, and Na, and pressure affects creep behavior and thus contributes to the change in creep mechanisms with location. While creep behavior is generally plotted as homologous temperature versus stress, in the case of the mantle it is often more useful to look at the pressure dependence of stress. Though stress is simply force over area, defining the area is difficult in geology. Equation 1 demonstrates the pressure dependence of stress. Since it is very difficult to simulate the high pressures in the mantle (1MPa at 300–400 km), the low pressure laboratory data is usually extrapolated to high pressures by applying creep concepts from metallurgy.

$$\left ( \frac{\partial \ln\sigma}{\partial P}\right)_{T,\dot{\epsilon}} = \left ( \frac{1}{TT_m} \right ) \times \left ( \frac{\partial \ln\sigma}{\partial (1/T)}\right)_{P,\dot{
\epsilon}} \times \frac{dT_m}{dP}$$

Most of the mantle has homologous temperatures of 0.65–0.75 and experiences strain rates of $10^{-14} - 10^{-16}$ per second. Stresses in the mantle are dependent on density, gravity, thermal expansion coefficients, temperature differences driving convection, and the distance over which convection occurs—all of which give stresses around a fraction of 3-30MPa.

Due to the large grain sizes (at low stresses as high as several mm), it is unlikely that Nabarro-Herring (NH) creep dominates; dislocation creep tends to dominate instead. 14 MPa is the stress below which diffusional creep dominates and above which power law creep dominates at 0.5Tm of olivine. Thus, even for relatively low temperatures, the stress diffusional creep would operate at is too low for realistic conditions. Though the power law creep rate increases with increasing water content due to weakening (reducing activation energy of diffusion and thus increasing the NH creep rate) NH is generally still not large enough to dominate. Nevertheless, diffusional creep can dominate in very cold or deep parts of the upper mantle.

Additional deformation in the mantle can be attributed to transformation enhanced ductility. Below 400 km, the olivine undergoes a pressure-induced phase transformation, which can cause more deformation due to the increased ductility. Further evidence for the dominance of power law creep comes from preferred lattice orientations as a result of deformation. Under dislocation creep, crystal structures reorient into lower stress orientations. This does not happen under diffusional creep, thus observation of preferred orientations in samples lends credence to the dominance of dislocation creep.

== Mantle convection in other celestial bodies ==
A similar process of slow convection probably occurs (or occurred) in the interiors of other planets (e.g., Venus, Mars) and some satellites (e.g., Io, Europa, Enceladus).

== See also ==
- Geodynamics – Study of dynamics of the Earth
- Compatibility (geochemistry) – Distribution of trace elements in melt
