= Low-velocity zone =

Seismic zone (geology)

Velocity of seismic waves in the Earth versus depth. S-waves (seismic shear waves) cannot propagate in liquids, leading to negligible velocity in the liquid outer core. The seismic velocities very near the surface (≲ 220±30 km) are markedly lower than at greater depths, demarking the LVZ.

In geology, the low-velocity zone (LVZ) occurs close to the boundary between the lithosphere and the asthenosphere in the upper mantle. It is characterized by unusually low seismic shear wave velocity compared to the surrounding depth intervals. This range of depths also corresponds to anomalously high electrical conductivity. It is present between about 80 and 300 km depth. This appears to be universally present for S waves, but may be absent in certain regions for P waves. A second low-velocity zone (not generally referred to as the LVZ, but as ULVZ) has been detected in a thin ≈50 km layer at the core-mantle boundary. These LVZs may have important implications for plate tectonics and the origin of the Earth's crust.

The LVZ has been interpreted to indicate the presence of a significant degree of partial melting, and alternatively as a natural consequence of a thermal boundary layer and the effects of pressure and temperature on the elastic wave velocity of mantle components in the solid state. In any event, a very limited amount of melt (about 1%) is needed to produce these effects. Water in this layer can lower the melting point, and may play an important part in its composition.

== Identification ==
The existence of the low-velocity zone was first proposed from the observation of slower than expected seismic wave arrivals from earthquakes in 1959 by Beno Gutenberg. He noted that between 1° and 15° from the epicenter the longitudinal arrivals showed an exponential decrease in amplitude after which they showed a sudden large increase. The presence of a low-velocity layer that defocussed the seismic energy, followed by a high-velocity gradient that concentrated it, provided an explanation for these observations.

== Characteristics ==
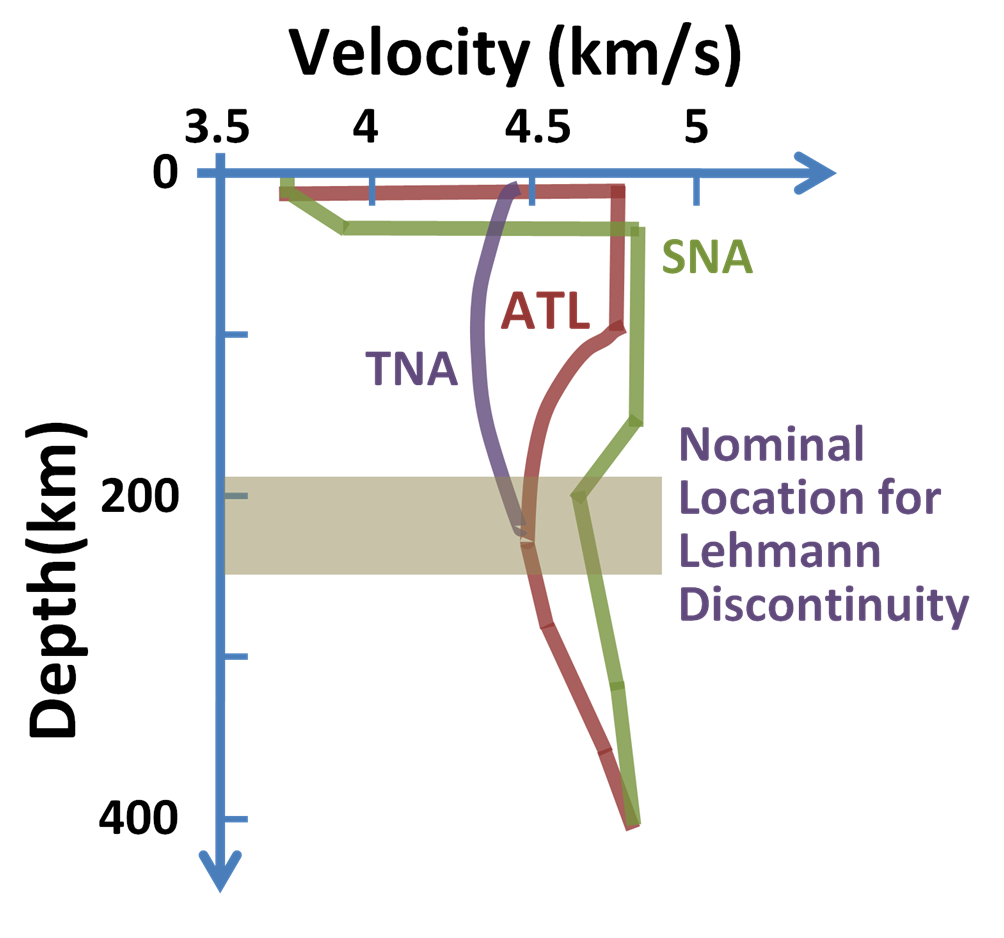
Velocity of seismic S-waves in the Earth near the surface in three tectonic provinces: TNA= Tectonic North America SNA= Shield North America & ATL = North Atlantic.

The LVZ shows a reduction in velocity of about 3–6% with the effect being more pronounced with S-waves compared to P-waves. As is evident from the figure, the reduction and depth over which reduction occurs varies with the choice of tectonic province, that is, regions differ in their seismic characteristics. Following the drop, the base of the zone is marked by an increase in velocity, but it has not been possible to decide whether this transition is sharp or gradual. This lower boundary, found beneath the continental lithosphere and oceanic lithosphere away from mid-ocean ridges, is sometimes referred to as the Lehmann discontinuity and occurs at about 220±30 km depth. The interval also shows a reduction in Q, the seismic quality factor (representing a relatively high degree of seismic attenuation), and a relatively high electrical conductivity.

The LVZ is present at the base of the lithosphere except in areas of thick continental shield where no velocity anomaly is apparent.

== Interpretation ==
The interpretation of these observations is complicated by the effects of seismic anisotropy, which may greatly reduce the actual scale of the velocity anomaly. However, because of the reductions in Q and electrical resistivity in the LVZ, it is generally interpreted as a zone in which there is a small degree of partial melting. For this to occur at the depths where the LVZ is observed, small amounts of water and/or carbon dioxide must be present to depress the melting point of the silicate minerals. Only 0.05–0.1 % water would be sufficient to cause the 1% of melting necessary to produce the observed changes in physical properties. The lack of LVZ beneath continental shields is explained by the much lower geothermal gradient, preventing any degree of partial melting.

== See also ==
- Geophysical anomalies
- Large low-shear-velocity provinces
- Ultra-low velocity zone
- Cataclysmic pole shift hypothesis
- Dzhanibekov effect
- Inner core super-rotation
- Intermediate axis theorem
