= Ultra-low velocity zone =

Regions in Earth's core-mantle boundary

Ultra low velocity zones (ULVZs) are patches on the core-mantle boundary that have extremely low seismic velocities. The zones are mapped to be hundreds of kilometers in diameter and tens of kilometers thick. Their shear wave velocities can be up to 45% lower than surrounding material.^{[16]} The composition and origin of the zones remain uncertain. The zones appear to correlate with edges of the African and Pacific large low-shear-velocity provinces (LLSVPs) as well as the location of hotspots.

== Discovery and constraints ==
ULVZs are discovered by the delay and scattering of body waves that reflect and diffract on or are refracted by the core-mantle boundary. Different body waves types give different constraints on the dimensions or velocity contrasts of the ULVZ. Even though ULVZs are discovered in places, it remains difficult to map out their extent and constrain their density and velocity. Usually trade-offs between various parameters exist. In general though, ULVZs appear to be a hundred to a thousand kilometers across and tens of kilometers thick (although existing thinner or smaller ULVZs might fall below the resolution of seismology). Their shear wave velocity reduction is on the order of −10 to −30% and the compressional wave velocity reduction tends to be weaker.

== Composition and origin ==
ULVZs are hypothesized to be enriched in iron, be partially molten or a combination of both, or result from the presence of carbon. Different scenarios have been proposed for the iron enrichment: iron could be leaking from the core, have accumulated over past subduction, or be remnants of a basal magma ocean. Both silicate perovskite and periclase (which are thought to be present in the lowermost mantle) show reduced velocities with increasing iron at these pressures and temperatures.

Experiments with iron and water under the same conditions form an iron peroxide FeO_{2}Hx that will contribute to ULVZ.

== Distribution and dynamics ==
ULVZs have higher density than their surroundings to remain stable on the core-mantle boundary. In a general mantle convection setting, the density contrast as well as the amount of material available would control the morphology/shape of the ULVZ. So far a range of sizes for ULVZs has been found. The location and shape of the ULVZs can also be controlled by the presence of thermo-chemical piles (or LLSVPs). The denser ULVZ material heaps up at the edges of these piles.

== Hawaiian ULVZ ==
The Hawaiian ULVZ appears to be the largest ULVZ mapped to date. It sits on the core-mantle boundary slightly to the west of the Hawaiian hotspot at the northern boundary of the Pacific large low-shear-velocity province. It is mapped out to be roughly 1000 km across and 20 km high. Its large aspect ratio dynamically suggests it is very dense. Its shear wave velocity reduction is roughly 20% compared to surrounding material. It remains speculative if there is a correlation between this large ULVZ and the presence of the strongest hotspot flux at the surface; potentially the ULVZ could be an anchor to a whole-mantle plume.

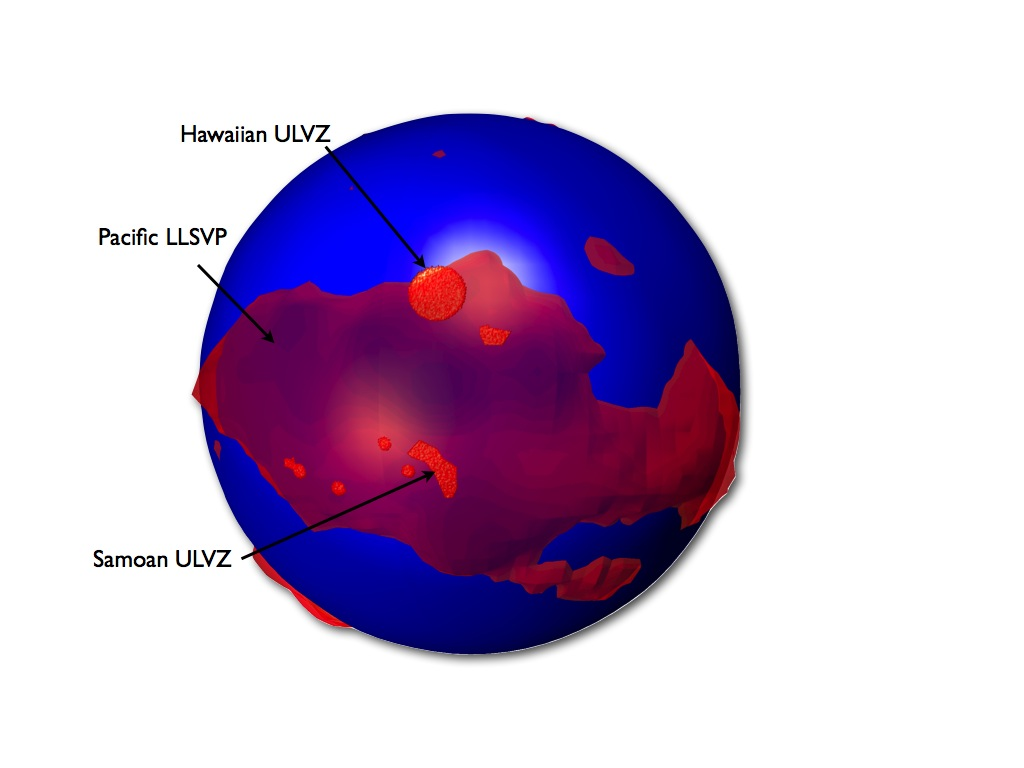
Cartoon of ultra low velocity zones (red structures) and the Pacific large low shear velocity province (red transparent) on the core of the Earth (blue)

== Samoan ULVZ ==
The Samoan is another mega-ultra-low velocity zone which lies directly beneath the Samoa hotspot. This zone is roughly 800 by 250 km (roughly the size of Florida) and is 10–15 km high. Its material appears 45% slower in shear wave velocity, 15% slower in compressional wave velocity and 10% denser. Additionally, the ULVZ appears to lie in a gap of the Pacific LLSVP (not represented in the illustration here), leading to the hypothesis that this slow material is pushed to the center by surrounding large piles.
