= Addams (crater) =

Crater on Venus

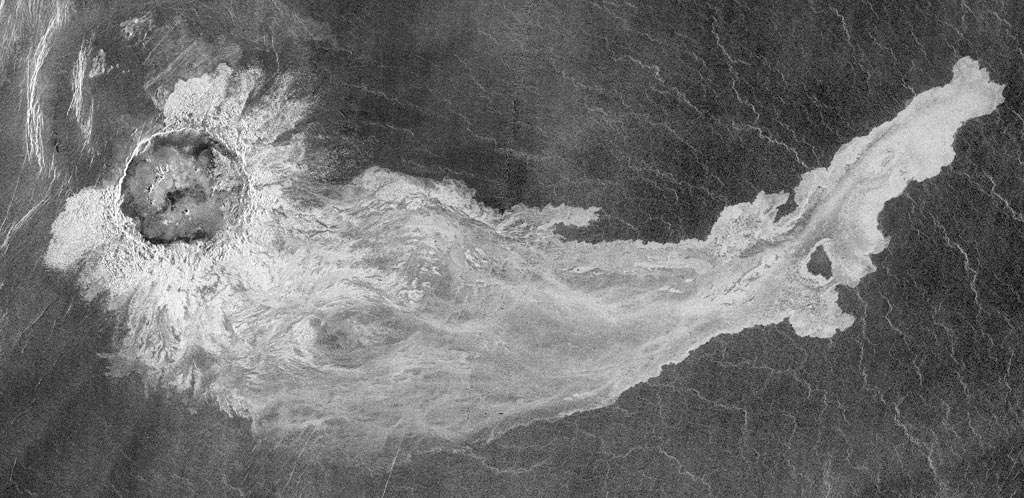
- Radar map of Addams crater from the Magellan probe
- Feature type: Impact crater
- Location: Venus
- Coordinates: 56.2°S 98.9°E
- Diameter: 87 km
- Eponym: Jane Addams

Addams is an 87 km diameter impact crater on Venus, located on the eastern flank of the Triglava Corona, and is on the surface of Laimdota Planitia. It was named after American social worker Jane Addams, which was adopted by the International Astronomical Union in the year 1994.

== Description ==
Addams has a bright outflow deposits from this oblique impact which extend 600 km from the crater rim. The material from this fluidized ejecta blanket likely lies on the down-trajectory side of the impact. It has a continuous ejecta radius of 68 km, and a wall width of 9.5 km.

== Tail Formation ==
Addams's tail was formed by an asteroid impacting onto the northwest surface of Venus, forming a crater basin with an ejecta blanket stretching across three quarters of the crater rim. In addition, the impact-melt ejecta and lava molten flowed downhill for about 370 miles (600 km) east from the impact crater, forming the tail. This is the largest outflow deposit for any Venusian crater, and it has been compared to a mermaid in form.
