= Teleseism =

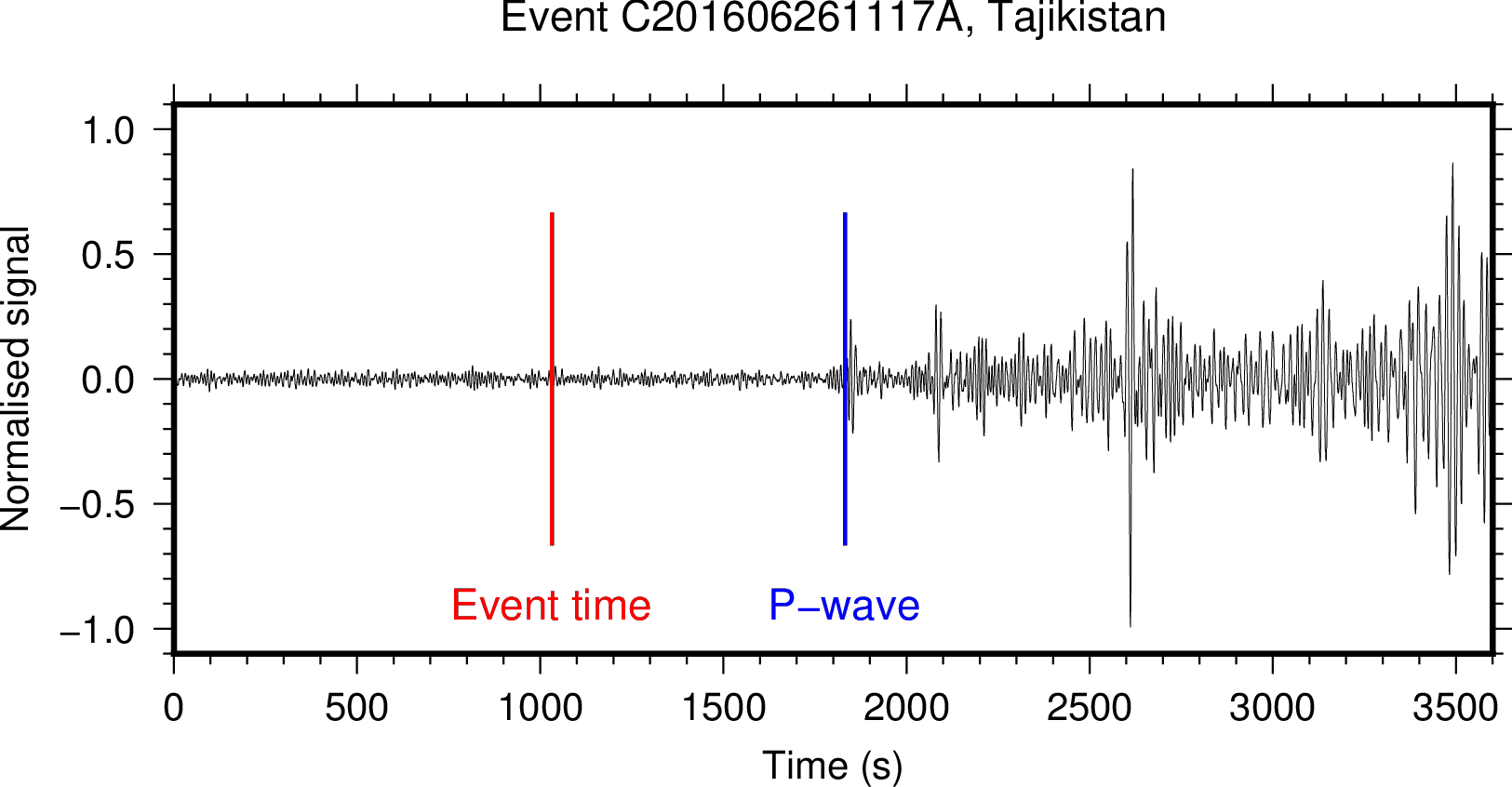
Record of a magnitude 6.5 event in Tajikistan captured by a broadband seismometer in the basement of Princeton University's Guyot Hall, 10,572 km from the source

A teleseism is a tremor caused by an earthquake that is very far away (from the Ancient Greek τῆλε) from where it is recorded. According to the USGS, the term teleseismic refers to earthquakes that occur more than 1000 km from the measurement site. Small teleseismic events register only on sensitive seismometers in low background noise locations. In general, seismic waves from earthquakes of magnitude 5.0 and up can be recorded almost anywhere in the world with modern seismic instrumentation.
