= Asthenosphere =

Highly viscous, ductile, and mechanically weak region of Earth's mantle

The asthenosphere shown at a subduction boundary

The asthenosphere (from Ancient Greek ἀσθενός (asthenós) 'without strength') is the mechanically weak and ductile region of the upper mantle of Earth. It lies below the lithosphere, at a depth between c. 80 and 200 km (50 and 120 mi) below the surface, and extends as deep as 700 km (430 mi). However, the lower boundary of the asthenosphere is not well defined.

The asthenosphere is almost solid, but a slight amount of melting (less than 0.1% of the rock) contributes to its mechanical weakness. More extensive decompression melting of the asthenosphere takes place where it wells upwards, and this is the most important source of magma on Earth. It is the source of mid-ocean ridge basalt (MORB) and of some magmas that erupt above subduction zones or in regions of continental rifting.

== Characteristics ==
The asthenosphere in relation to the other layers of Earth's structure

The asthenosphere is a part of the upper mantle just below the lithosphere that is involved in plate tectonic movement and isostatic adjustments. It is composed of peridotite, a rock containing mostly the minerals olivine and pyroxene. The lithosphere-asthenosphere boundary is conventionally taken at the 1,300 °C (2,370 °F) isotherm. Closer to the surface at lower temperatures, the mantle behaves rigidly; deeper below the surface at higher temperatures, the mantle moves in a ductile fashion. The asthenosphere is where the mantle rock most closely approaches its melting point, and a small amount of melt is likely to present in this layer.

Seismic waves pass relatively slowly through the asthenosphere compared to the overlying lithospheric mantle. Thus, it has been called the low-velocity zone (LVZ), although the two are not strictly the same; the lower boundary of the LVZ lies at a depth of 180 to 220 kilometers (110 to 140 mi), whereas the base of the asthenosphere lies at a depth of about 700 kilometers (430 mi). The LVZ also has a high seismic attenuation (seismic waves moving through the asthenosphere lose energy) and significant anisotropy (shear waves polarized vertically have a lower velocity than shear waves polarized horizontally). The discovery of the LVZ alerted seismologists to the existence of the asthenosphere and gave some information about its physical properties, as the speed of seismic waves decreases with decreasing rigidity. This decrease in seismic wave velocity from the lithosphere to the asthenosphere could be caused by the presence of a very small percentage of melt in the asthenosphere, though since the asthenosphere transmits S waves, it cannot be fully melted.

In the oceanic mantle, the transition from the lithosphere to the asthenosphere (the LAB) is shallower than for the continental mantle (about 60 km in some old oceanic regions) with a sharp and large velocity drop (5–10%). At the mid-ocean ridges, the LAB rises to within a few kilometers of the ocean floor.

The upper part of the asthenosphere is believed to be the zone upon which the great rigid and brittle lithospheric plates of the Earth's crust move about. Due to the temperature and pressure conditions in the asthenosphere, rock becomes ductile, moving at rates of deformation measured in cm/yr over lineal distances eventually measuring thousands of kilometers. In this way, it flows like a convection current, radiating heat outward from the Earth's interior. Above the asthenosphere, at the same rate of deformation, rock behaves elastically and, being brittle, can break, causing faults. The rigid lithosphere is thought to "float" or move about on the slowly flowing asthenosphere, enabling isostatic equilibrium and allowing the movement of tectonic plates.

== Boundaries ==
The asthenosphere extends from an upper boundary at approximately 80 to 200 km (50 to 120 miles) below the surface to a lower boundary at a depth of approximately 700 kilometers (430 mi).

=== Lithosphere-asthenosphere boundary ===
The lithosphere-asthenosphere boundary (LAB) is relatively sharp and likely coincides with the onset of partial melting or a change in composition or anisotropy. Various definitions of the boundary reflect various aspects of the boundary region. In addition to the mechanical boundary defined by seismic data, which reflects the transition from the rigid lithosphere to ductile asthenosphere, these include a thermal boundary layer, above which heat is transported by thermal conduction and below which heat transfer is mainly convective; a rheological boundary, where the viscosity drops below about 10^{21} Pa⋅s; and a chemical boundary layer, above which the mantle rock is depleted in volatiles and enriched in magnesium relative to the rock below.

=== Lower boundary of asthenosphere ===
The lower boundary of the asthenosphere, the top of the tentatively defined mesosphere or mesospheric shell, is less well-defined, but has been placed at the base of the upper mantle. This boundary is neither seismically sharp nor well understood but is approximately coincident with the complex 670 km discontinuity. This discontinuity is generally linked to the transition from mantle rock containing ringwoodite to mantle rock containing bridgmanite and periclase.

== Origin ==
The mechanical properties of the asthenosphere are widely attributed to the partial melting of the rock. It is likely that a small amount of melt is present through much of the asthenosphere, where it is stabilized by the traces of volatiles (water and carbon dioxide) present in the mantle rock. However, the likely amount of melt, not more than about 0.1% of the rock, seems inadequate to fully explain the existence of the asthenosphere. This is not enough melt to fully wet grain boundaries in the rock, and the effects of melt on the mechanical properties of the rock are not expected to be significant if the grain boundaries are not fully wetted. The sharp lithosphere-asthenosphere boundary is also difficult to explain by partial melting alone. It is possible that the asthenosphere is a zone of minimum water solubility in mantle minerals so that more water is available to form greater quantities of melt. Another possible mechanism for producing mechanical weakness is grain boundary sliding, where grains slide slightly past each other under stress, lubricated by the traces of volatiles present. Weakening below oceanic plates is partly caused by their motion itself, thanks to the non-linear dislocation creep mechanism.

Numerical models of mantle convection in which the viscosity is dependent both on temperature and strain rate reliably produce an oceanic asthenosphere, suggesting that strain-rate weakening is a significant contributing mechanism, and explaining the particularly weak asthenosphere below the Pacific plate.

== Magma generation ==
Decompression melting of asthenospheric rock creeping towards the surface is the most important source of magma on Earth. Most of this erupts at mid-ocean ridges to form the distinctive mid-ocean ridge basalt (MORB) of the ocean crust. Magmas are also generated by decompressional melting of the asthenosphere above subduction zones and in areas of continental rifting.

Decompression melting in upwelling asthenosphere likely begins at a depth as great as 100 to 150 kilometers (60 to 90 mi), where the small amounts of volatiles in the mantle rock (about 100 ppm of water and 60 ppm of carbon dioxide) assist in melting not more than about 0.1% of the rock. At a depth of about 70 kilometers (40 mi), dry melting conditions are reached and melting increases substantially. This dehydrates the remaining solid rock and is likely the origin of the chemically depleted lithosphere.

== See also ==
- Seismology § History

== Bibliography ==
- Hirschmann, Marc M. (March 2010). "Partial melt in the oceanic low velocity zone". Physics of the Earth and Planetary Interiors. 179 (1–2): 60–71. Bibcode:2010PEPI..179...60H. doi:10.1016/j.pepi.2009.12.003.
- Karato, Shun-ichiro (March 2012). "On the origin of the asthenosphere". Earth and Planetary Science Letters. 321–322: 95–103. Bibcode:2012E&PSL.321...95K. doi:10.1016/j.epsl.2012.01.001.
- Patočka, Vojtěch; Čížková, Hana; Pokorný, J. (12 November 2024). "Dynamic Component of the Asthenosphere: Lateral Viscosity Variations Due to Dislocation Creep at the Base of Oceanic Plates". Geophysical Research Letters. 51 (13). Bibcode:2024GeoRL..5109116P. doi:10.1029/2024GL109116. hdl:20.500.14178/2796.
- Kearey, P.; Klepeis, Keith A.; Vine, F.J. (2009). Global Tectonics (3rd ed.). Oxford: Wiley-Blackwell. ISBN 978-1-4051-0777-8. OCLC 132681514.
- McBride, Neil; Gilmour, Iain (2004). An Introduction to the Solar System. Cambridge University Press. ISBN 978-0-521-54620-1.
- Turcotte, Donald L.; Schubert, Gerald (2002). Geodynamics (2nd ed.). Cambridge University Press. ISBN 978-0-521-66624-4.
