= Crustal recycling =

Tectonic recycling process

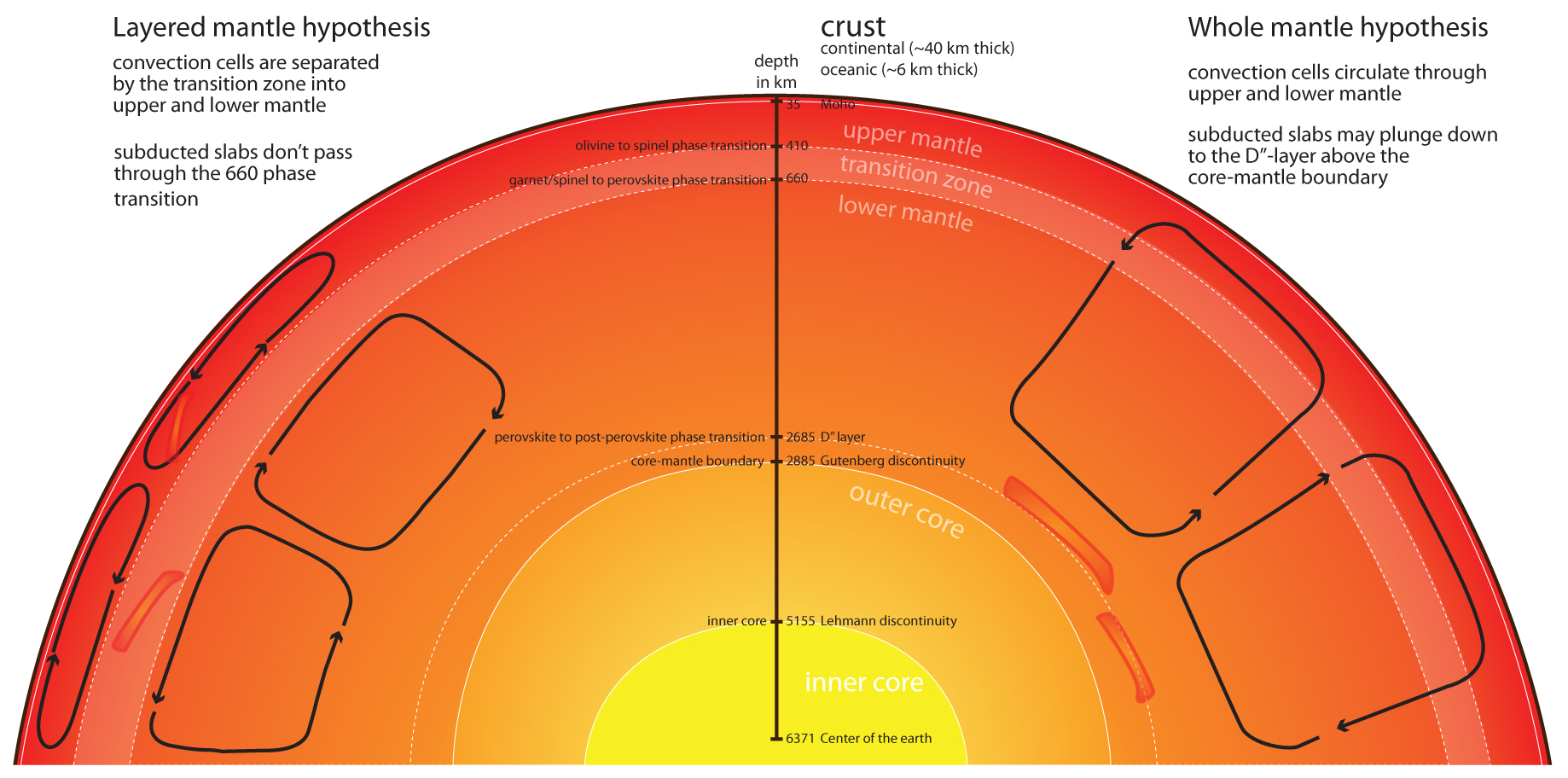
Understanding predictions of mantle dynamics helps geoscientists predict where subducted crust will end up.

Crustal recycling is a tectonic process by which surface material from the lithosphere is recycled into the mantle by subduction erosion or delamination. The subducting slabs carry volatile compounds and water into the mantle, as well as crustal material with an isotopic signature different from that of primitive mantle. Identification of this crustal signature in mantle-derived rocks (such as mid-ocean ridge basalts or kimberlites) is proof of crustal recycling.

== Historical and theoretical context ==
Between 1906 and 1936 seismological data were used by R.D. Oldham, A. Mohorovičić, B. Gutenberg and I. Lehmann to show that the earth consisted of a solid crust and mantle, a fluid outer core and a solid innermost core. The development of seismology as a modern tool for imaging the Earth's deep interior occurred during the 1980s, and with it developed two camps of geologists: whole-mantle convection proponents and layered-mantle convection proponents.

Layered-mantle convection proponents hold that the mantle's convective activity is layered, separated by densest-packing phase transitions of minerals like olivine, garnet and pyroxene to more dense crystal structures (spinel and then silicate perovskite and post-perovskite). Slabs that are subducted may be negatively buoyant as a result of being cold from their time on the surface and inundation with water, but this negative buoyancy is not enough to move through the 660-km phase transition.

Whole-mantle (simple) convection proponents hold that the mantle’s observed density differences (which are inferred to be products of mineral phase transitions) do not restrict convective motion, which moves through the upper and lower mantle as a single convective cell. Subducting slabs are able to move through the 660-km phase transition and collect near the bottom of the mantle in a 'slab graveyard', and may be the driving force for convection in the mantle locally and on a crustal scale.

== The fate of subducted material ==
The ultimate fate of crustal material is key to understanding geochemical cycling, as well as persistent heterogeneities in the mantle, upwelling and myriad effects on magma composition, melting, plate tectonics, mantle dynamics and heat flow. If slabs are stalled out at the 660-kilometre (410 mi) boundary, as the layered-mantle hypothesis suggests, they cannot be incorporated into hot spot plumes, thought to originate at the core-mantle boundary. If slabs end up in a "slab graveyard" at the core-mantle boundary, they cannot be involved in flat slab subduction geometry. Mantle dynamics is likely a mix of the two end-member hypotheses, resulting in a partially layered mantle convection system.

The current understanding of the structure of the deep Earth is informed mostly by inference from direct and indirect measurements of mantle properties using seismology, petrology, isotope geochemistry and seismic tomography techniques. Seismology in particular is heavily relied upon for information about the deep mantle near the core-mantle boundary.

== Evidence ==
=== Seismic tomography ===
Although seismic tomography was producing low-quality images of the Earth's mantle in the 1980s, images published in a 1997 editorial article in the journal Science clearly showed a cool slab near the core-mantle boundary, as did work completed in 2005 by Hutko et al., showing a seismic tomography image that may be cold, folded slab material at the core-mantle boundary. However, the phase transitions may still play a role in the behavior of slabs at depth. Schellart et al. showed that the 660-km phase transition may serve to deflect downgoing slabs. The shape of the subduction zone was also key in whether the geometry of the slab could overcome the phase transition boundary.

Mineralogy may also play a role, as locally metastable olivine will form areas of positive buoyancy, even in a cold downgoing slab, and this could cause slabs to 'stall out' at the increased density of the 660-km phase transition. Slab mineralogy and its evolution at depth were not initially computed with information about the heating rate of a slab, which could prove essential to helping maintain negative buoyancy long enough to pierce the 660 km phase change. Additional work completed by Spasojevic et al. showed that local minima in the geoid could be accounted for by the processes that occur in and around slab graveyards, as indicated in their models.

=== Stable isotopes ===
Understanding that the differences between Earth's layers are not just rheological, but chemical, is essential to understanding how we can track the movement of crustal material even after it has been subducted. After a rock has moved to the surface of the Earth from beneath the crust, that rock can be sampled for its stable isotopic composition. It can then be compared to known crustal and mantle isotopic compositions, as well as that of chondrites, which are understood to represent original material from the formation of the Solar System in a largely unaltered state.

One group of researchers was able to estimate that between 5 and 10% of the upper mantle is composed of recycled crustal material. Kokfelt et al. completed an isotopic examination of the mantle plume under Iceland and found that erupted mantle lavas incorporated lower crustal components, confirming crustal recycling at the local level.

Some carbonatite units, which are associated with immiscible volatile-rich magmas and the mantle indicator mineral diamond, have shown isotopic signals for organic carbon, which could only have been introduced by subducted organic material. The work done on carbonatites by Walter et al. and others further develops the magmas at depth as being derived from dewatering slab material.

The δ^{34}S isotopic signatures of magmas have also been used to measure the degree of crustal recycling over geologic time.
