= Land =

Earth's dry surface

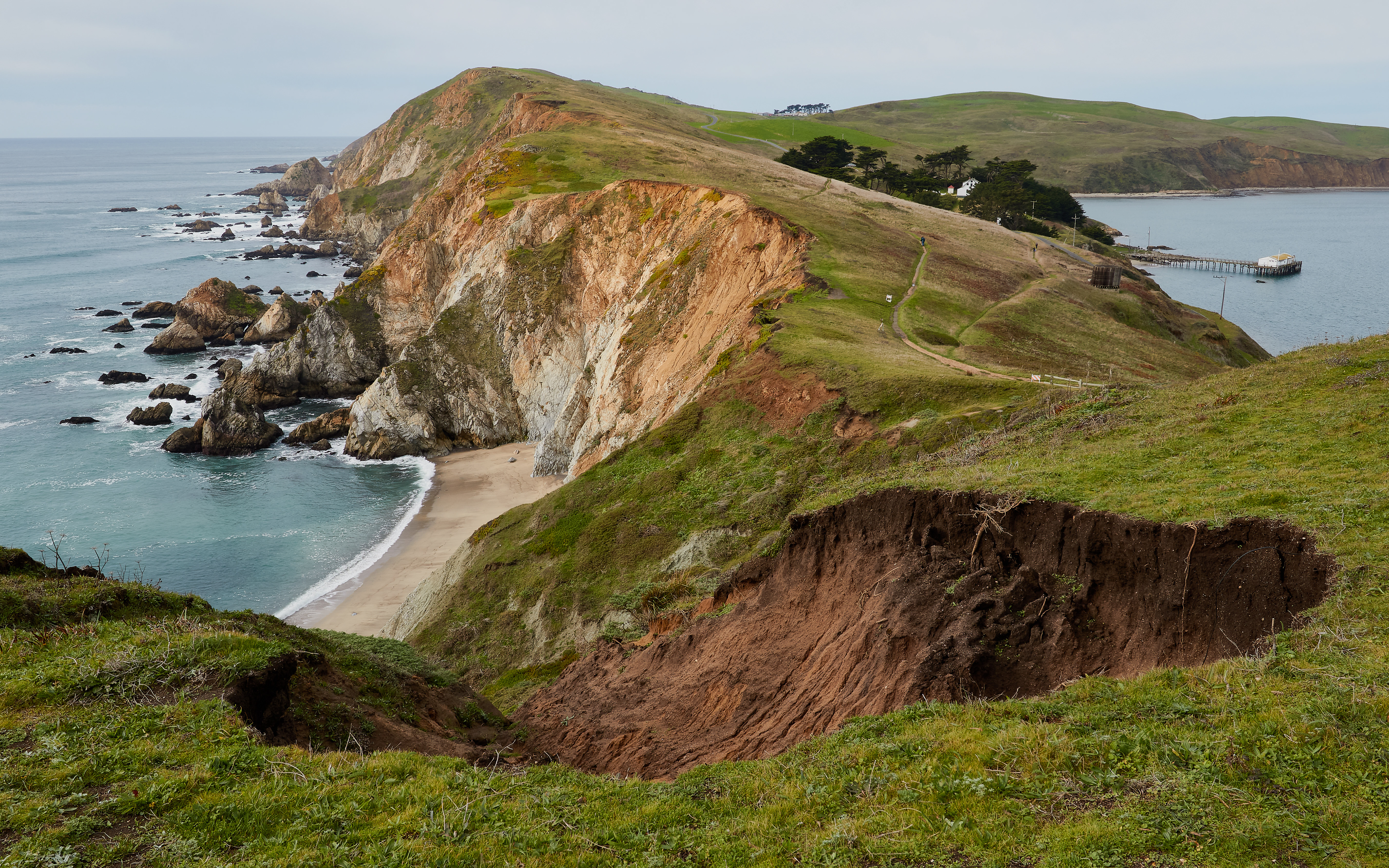
Land between bodies of water at Point Reyes National Seashore, California

Land, also known as dry land, ground, or earth, is the solid terrestrial surface of Earth not submerged by the ocean or another body of water. It makes up approximately 29% of Earth's surface and includes all continents and islands. Earth's land surface is almost entirely covered by regolith, a layer of rock, soil, and minerals that forms the outer part of the crust. Land plays an important role in Earth's climate system, being involved in the carbon cycle, nitrogen cycle, and water cycle. One-third of land is covered in trees another third is used for agriculture, and roughly one-tenth is covered in glacier ice. The remainder consists of desert, savannah, and prairie.

Land terrain varies greatly, consisting of mountains, deserts, plains, plateaus, glaciers, and other landforms. In physical geology, the land is divided into two major categories: Mountain ranges and relatively flat interiors called cratons. Both form over millions of years through plate tectonics. Streams – a major part of Earth's water cycle – shape the landscape, carve rocks, transport sediments, and replenish groundwater. At high elevations or latitudes, snow is compacted and recrystallized over hundreds or thousands of years to form glaciers, which can be so heavy that they warp the Earth's crust. About 30 percent of land has a dry climate, due to losing more water through evaporation than it gains from precipitation. Since warm air rises, this generates winds, though Earth's rotation and uneven sun distribution also play a part.

Land is commonly defined as the solid, dry surface of Earth. It can also refer to the collective natural resources that the land holds, including rivers, lakes, and the biosphere. Human manipulation of the land, including agriculture and architecture, can also be considered part of land. Land is formed from the continental crust, the layer of rock on which soil, groundwater, and human and other animal activity sit.

Though modern terrestrial plants and animals evolved from aquatic creatures, Earth's first cellular life likely originated on land. Survival on land relies on fresh water from rivers, streams, lakes, and glaciers, which constitute only three percent of the water on Earth. The vast majority of human activity throughout history has occurred in habitable land areas supporting agriculture and various natural resources. In recent decades, scientists and policymakers have emphasized the need to manage land and its biosphere more sustainably, through measures such as restoring degraded soil, preserving biodiversity, protecting endangered species, and addressing climate change.

== Definition ==
Land is often defined as the solid, dry surface of Earth. The word land may also collectively refer to the collective natural resources of Earth, including its land cover, rivers, shallow lakes, its biosphere, the lowest layer of the atmosphere (troposphere), groundwater reserves, and the physical results of human activity on land, such as architecture and agriculture. The boundary between land and sea is called the shoreline.

== Etymology ==
The word land is derived from Old English, from the Proto-Germanic word *landą, "untilled land", and then the Proto-Indo-European *lendʰ-, especially in northern regions that were home to languages like Proto-Celtic and Proto-Slavic. Examples include Old Irish land, "land, plot, church building" and Old Irish ithlann, "threshing floor", and Old East Slavic ljadina "wasteland, weeds".

A country or nation may be referred to as the motherland, fatherland, or homeland of its people. Many countries and other places have names incorporating the suffix -land (e.g., England, Greenland, and New Zealand). The equivalent suffix -stan from Indo-Iranian, ultimately derived from the Proto-Indo-Iranian *sthāna-, is also present in many country and location names, such as Pakistan, Afghanistan, and others throughout Central Asia. The suffix is also used more generally, as in Persian rigestân (ریگستان) "place of sand, desert", golestân (گلستان) "place of flowers, garden", gurestân (گورستان) "graveyard, cemetery", and Hindustân (هندوستان) "land of the Indo people".

== Physical science ==
The study of land and its history in general is called geography. Mineralogy is the study of minerals, and petrology is the study of rocks. Soil science is the study of soils, encompassing the sub-disciplines of pedology, which focuses on soil formation, and edaphology, which focuses on the relationship between soil and life.

=== Formation ===
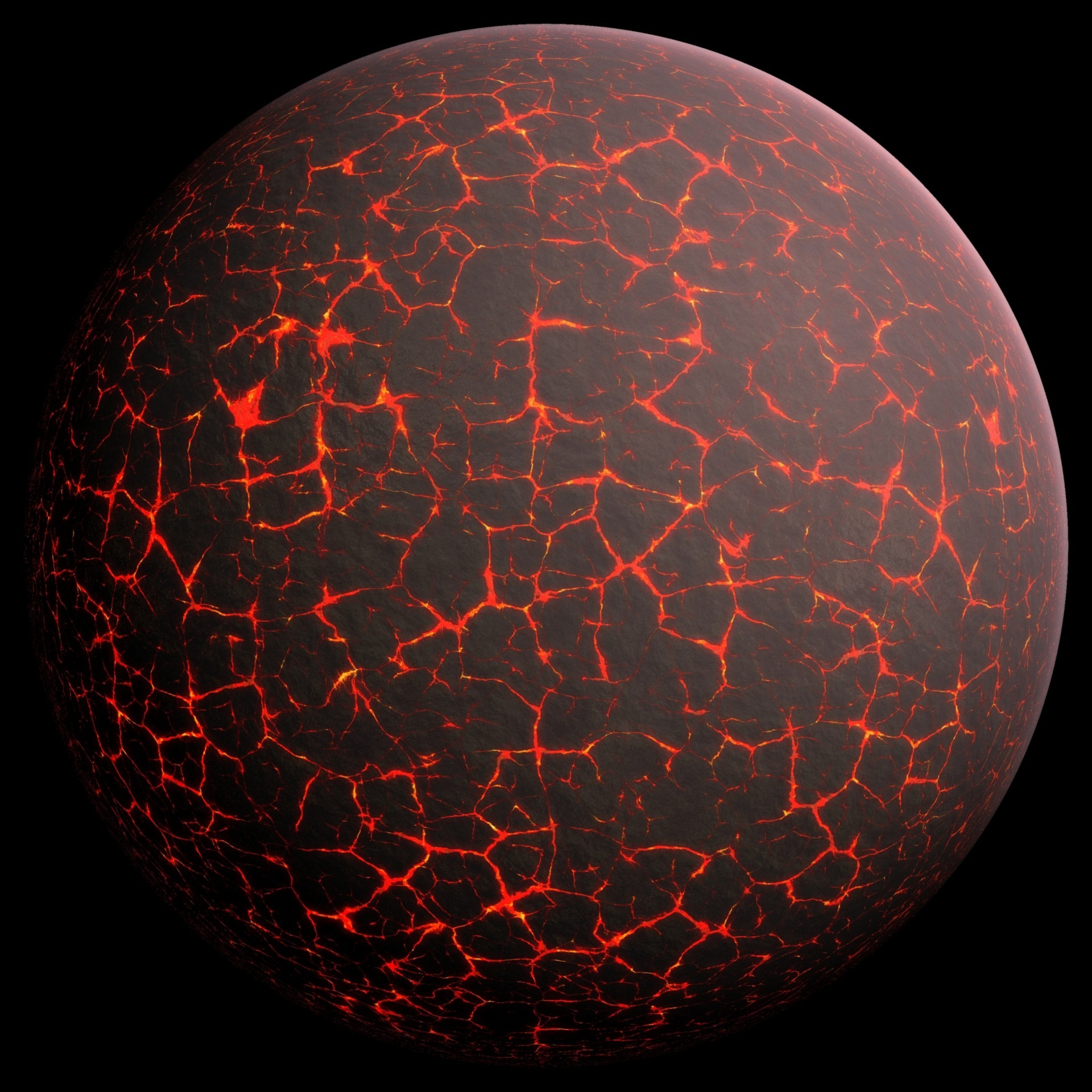
Artist's conception of Hadean Eon Earth

The earliest material found in the Solar System is dated to 4.5672±0.0006 bya (billion years ago); therefore, Earth itself must have been formed by accretion around this time. The formation and evolution of the Solar System bodies occurred in tandem with the Sun. In theory, a solar nebula partitions a volume out of a molecular cloud by gravitational collapse, which begins to spin and flatten into a circumstellar disc, out of which the planets then grow (in tandem with the star). A nebula contains gas, ice grains and dust (including primordial nuclides). In the nebular hypothesis, planetesimals begin to form as particulate matter accumulates by cohesive clumping and then by gravity. The primordial Earth's assembly took 10–20 myr. By 4.54±0.04 bya, the primordial Earth had formed.

Earth's atmosphere and oceans were formed by volcanic activity and outgassing that included water vapour. The origin of the world's oceans was condensation augmented by water and ice delivered by asteroids, protoplanets, and comets. In this model, atmospheric "greenhouse gases" kept the oceans from freezing while the newly formed Sun was only at 70% luminosity. By 3.5 bya, the Earth's magnetic field was established, which helped prevent the atmosphere from being stripped away by the solar wind. The atmosphere and oceans of the Earth continuously shape the land by eroding and transporting solids on the surface.

Earth's crust formed when the molten outer layer of Planet Earth cooled to form a solid mass as the accumulated water vapour began to act in the atmosphere. Once land became capable of supporting life, biodiversity evolved over hundreds of millions of years, expanding continually except when punctuated by mass extinctions.

The two models that explain landmasses propose either a steady growth to the present-day forms or, more likely, a rapid growth early in Earth's history followed by a long-term steady continental area. Continents are formed by plate tectonics, a process ultimately driven by the continuous loss of heat from the Earth's interior. On time scales lasting hundreds of millions of years, the supercontinents have formed and broken apart three times. Roughly 750 mya (million years ago), one of the earliest known supercontinents, Rodinia, began to break apart. The continents later recombined to form Pannotia, 600–540 mya, then finally Pangaea, which also broke apart 180 mya.

=== Landmasses ===
Map of the seven continents

A continuous area of land surrounded by an ocean is called a landmass. Although it is most often written as one word to distinguish it from the usage "land mass"—the measure of land area—it may also be written as two words. There are four major continuous landmasses on Earth: Africa–Eurasia, America (landmass), Antarctica, and Australia (landmass), which are subdivided into continents. Up to seven geographical regions are commonly regarded as continents. Ordered from greatest to least land area, these continents are Asia, Africa, North America, South America, Antarctica, Europe, and Australia.

=== Terrain ===
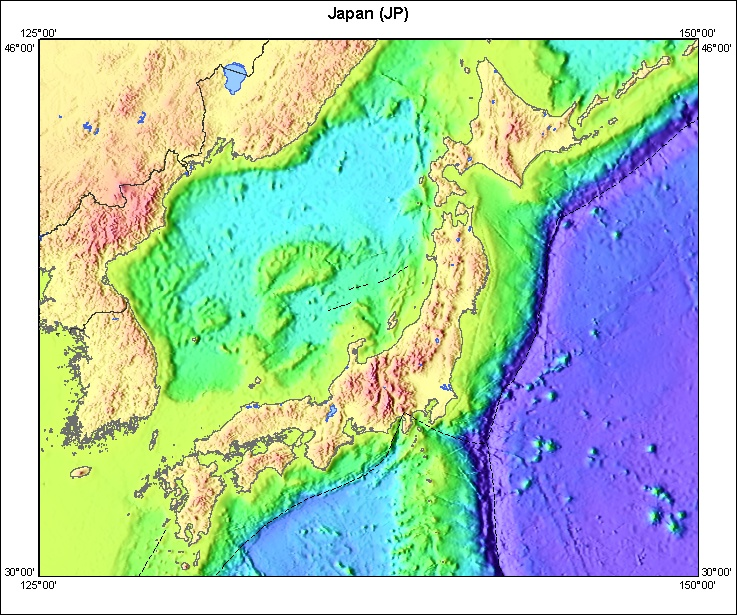
A topographical map of Japan showing the elevation of the terrain

Terrain refers to an area of land and its features. Terrain affects travel, mapmaking, ecosystems, and surface water flow and distribution. Over a large area, it can influence climate and weather patterns. The terrain of a region largely determines its suitability for human settlement: flatter alluvial plains tend to have better farming soils than steeper, rockier uplands.

Elevation is defined as the vertical distance between an object and sea level, while altitude is defined as the vertical distance from an object to Earth's surface. The elevation of Earth's land surface varies from the low point of −418 metres (−1,371 feet) at the Dead Sea to a maximum altitude of 8,848 metres (29,029 feet) at the top of Mount Everest. The mean height of land above sea level is about 797 metres (2,615 feet), with 98.9% of dry land situated above sea level.

Relief refers to the difference in elevation within a landscape; for example, flat terrain would have "low relief", while terrain with a large elevation difference between the highest and lowest points would be deemed "high relief". Most land has relatively low relief. The change in elevation between two points of the terrain is called a slope or gradient. A topographic map is a form of terrain cartography which depicts terrain in terms of its elevation, slope, and the orientation of its landforms. It has prominent contour lines, which connect points of similar elevation, while perpendicular slope lines point in the direction of the steepest slope. Hypsometric tints are colors placed between contour lines to indicate elevation relative to sea level.

A difference between uplands, or highlands, and lowlands is drawn in several earth science fields. In river ecology, "upland" rivers are fast-moving and colder than "lowland" rivers, encouraging different species of fish and other aquatic wildlife to live in these habitats. For example, nutrients are more present in slow-moving lowland rivers, encouraging different species of macrophytes to grow there. The term "upland" is also used in wetland ecology, where "upland" plants indicate an area that is not a wetland. In addition, the term moorland refers to upland shrubland biomes with acidic soils, while heathlands are lowland shrublands with acidic soils.

=== Geomorphology ===
Geomorphology refers to the study of the natural processes that shape land's surface, creating landforms. Erosion and tectonics, volcanic eruptions, flooding, weathering, glaciation, the growth of coral reefs, and meteorite impacts are among the processes that constantly reshape Earth's surface over geological time.

Erosion transports one part of land to another via natural processes, such as wind, water, ice, and gravity. In contrast, weathering wears away rock and other solid land without transporting the land somewhere else. Natural erosional processes usually take a long time to cause noticeable changes in the landscape—for example, the Grand Canyon was created over the past 70 million years by the Colorado River, which scientists estimate continues to erode the canyon at a rate of 0.3 meters (0.98 feet) every 200 years. However, humans have caused erosion to be 10–40 times faster than normal, causing half the topsoil of the surface of Earth's land to be lost within the past 150 years.

Plate tectonics refers to the theory that Earth's lithosphere is divided into "tectonic plates" that move over the mantle. This results in continental drift, with continents moving relative to each other. The scientist Alfred Wegener first hypothesized the theory of continental drift in 1912. More researchers developed his idea throughout the 20th century into the now widely accepted theory of plate tectonics.

Several key characteristics define the modern understanding of plate tectonics. The place where two tectonic plates meet is called a plate boundary, with different geological phenomena occurring across different kinds of boundaries. For example, at divergent plate boundaries, seafloor spreading is usually seen, in contrast with the subduction zones of convergent or transform plate boundaries.

Earthquakes and volcanic activity are common in all types of boundaries. Volcanic activity refers to any rupture in Earth's surface where magma escapes, therefore becoming lava. The Ring of Fire, containing two-thirds of the world's volcanoes, and over 70% of Earth's seismological activity, comprises plate boundaries surrounding the Pacific Ocean. (Note: The exact number of volcanoes depends on the geographic boundaries used by the source. This number excludes Antarctica and the western islands of Indonesia and includes the Izu, Bonin, and Mariana Islands.)

=== Climate ===
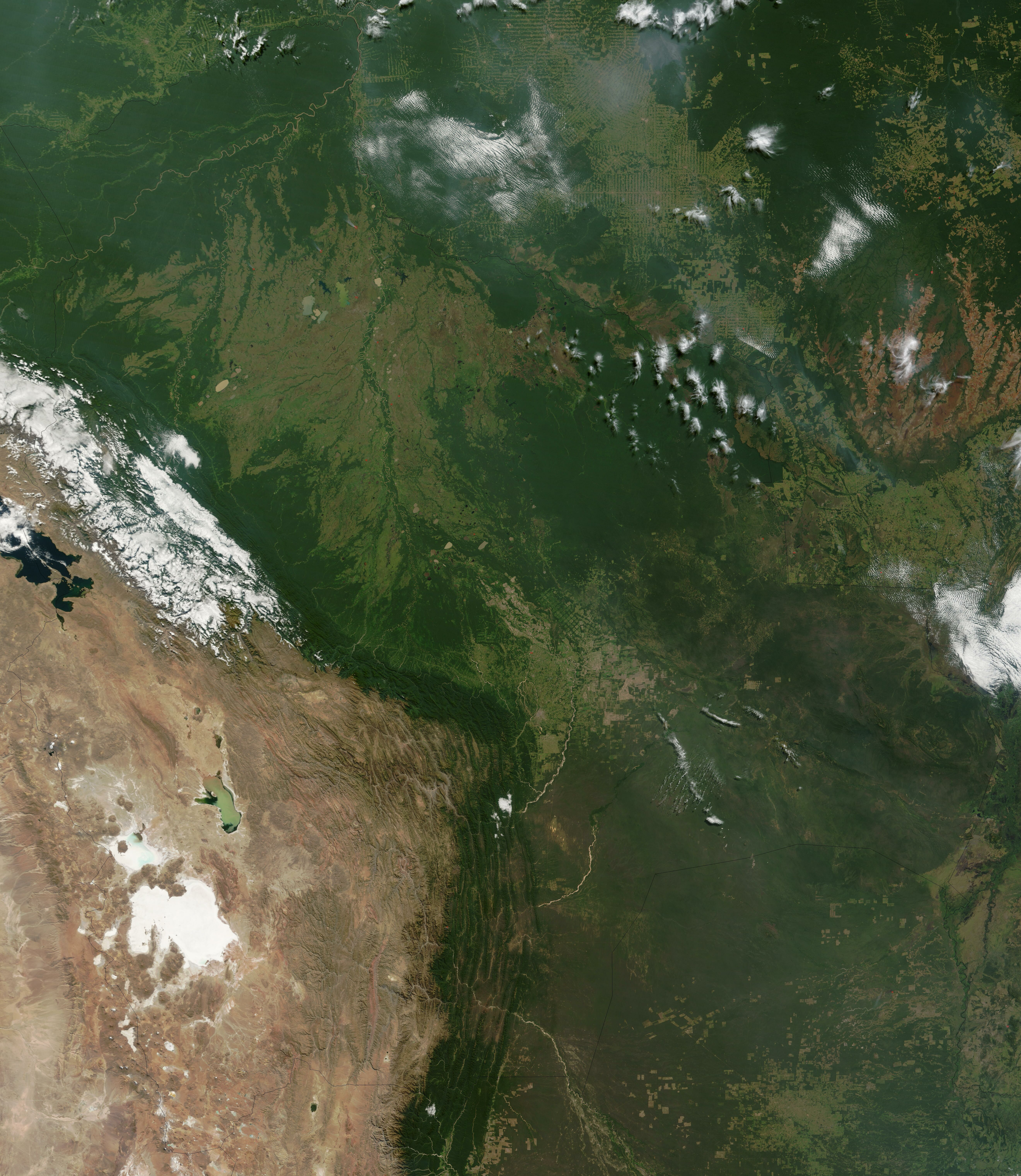
The Andes create a rain shadow, separating the wet Amazon basin from the dry Altiplano.

Earth's land interacts with and influences its climate heavily, since the land's surface heats up and cools down faster than air or water. Latitude, elevation, topography, reflectivity, and land use all have varying effects on climate. The latitude of the land will influence how much solar radiation reaches its surface. High latitudes receive less solar radiation than low latitudes. The land's topography is important in creating and transforming airflow and precipitation. Large landforms, such as mountain ranges, can divert wind energy and make air parcels less dense and therefore able to hold less heat. As air rises, this cooling effect causes condensation and precipitation.

Different types of land cover will influence the land's albedo, a measure of the solar radiation that is reflected, rather than absorbed and transferred to Earth. Vegetation has a relatively low albedo, meaning that vegetated surfaces are good absorbers of the sun's energy. Forests have an albedo of 10–15 percent while grasslands have an albedo of 15–20 percent. In comparison, sandy deserts have an albedo of 25–40 percent.

Land use by humans also plays a role in the regional and global climate. Densely populated cities are warmer and create urban heat islands that have effects on the precipitation, cloud cover, and temperature of the region.

== Features ==
A landform is a natural or manmade land feature. Landforms together make up a given terrain, and their arrangement in the landscape is known as topography. Landforms include hills, mountains, canyons, and valleys, as well as shoreline features such as bays, capes, and peninsulas.

=== Coasts and islands ===
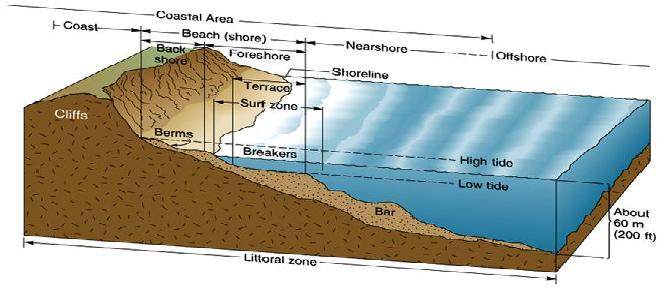
A simplified diagram of the littoral zone, which includes the coast and nearby waters

The shoreline is the interface between the land and the ocean. It migrates each day as tides rise and fall and moves over long periods of time as sea levels change. The shore extends from the low tide line to the highest elevation that can be reached by storm waves, and the coast stretches out inland until the point where ocean-related features are no longer found.

When land is in contact with bodies of water, it can be eroded. The weathering of a coastline may be impacted by the tides, caused by changes in gravitational forces on larger bodies of water. Coasts are important zones in natural ecosystems, often home to a wide range of biodiversity. On land, they harbour important ecosystems such as freshwater or estuarine wetlands, which are important for bird populations and other terrestrial animals. In wave-protected areas, they harbor saltmarshes, mangroves or seagrasses, all of which can provide nursery habitat for finfish, shellfish, and other aquatic species. Rocky shores are usually found along exposed coasts and provide habitat for a wide range of sessile animals (e.g., mussels, starfish, barnacles) and various kinds of seaweeds. Along tropical coasts with clear, nutrient-poor water, coral reefs can often be found between depths of 1–50 meters (3.3–164.0 ft).

According to a United Nations atlas, 44% of all people live within 150 km (93 mi) of the sea. Because of their importance in society and high concentration of population, the coast is important for major parts of the global food and economic system, and they provide many ecosystem services to humankind. For example, important human activities happen in port cities. Coastal fisheries for commercial, recreational, and subsistence purposes, and aquaculture are major economic activities and provide jobs, livelihoods, and protein for the majority of coastal human populations. Other coastal spaces like beaches and seaside resorts generate economic activity through tourism. Marine coastal ecosystems can also provide protection against sea level rise and tsunamis. In many countries, the coastal mangrove is the primary source of wood for fuel (e.g., charcoal) and building materials. Coastal ecosystems have a much higher capacity for carbon sequestration than many terrestrial ecosystems, and as such can play a critical role in the near future to help mitigate climate change effects by uptake of atmospheric anthropogenic carbon dioxide.

A subcontinental area of land surrounded by water is an island, and a chain of islands is an archipelago. The smaller the island, the larger the percentage of its land area will be adjacent to the water, and subsequently will be coast or beach. Islands can be formed by a variety of processes. The Hawaiian Islands, for example, even though they are not near a plate boundary, formed from isolated volcanic activity. Atolls are ring-shaped islands made of coral, created when subsidence causes an island to sink beneath the ocean surface and leaves a ring of reefs around it.

=== Mountains and plateaus ===
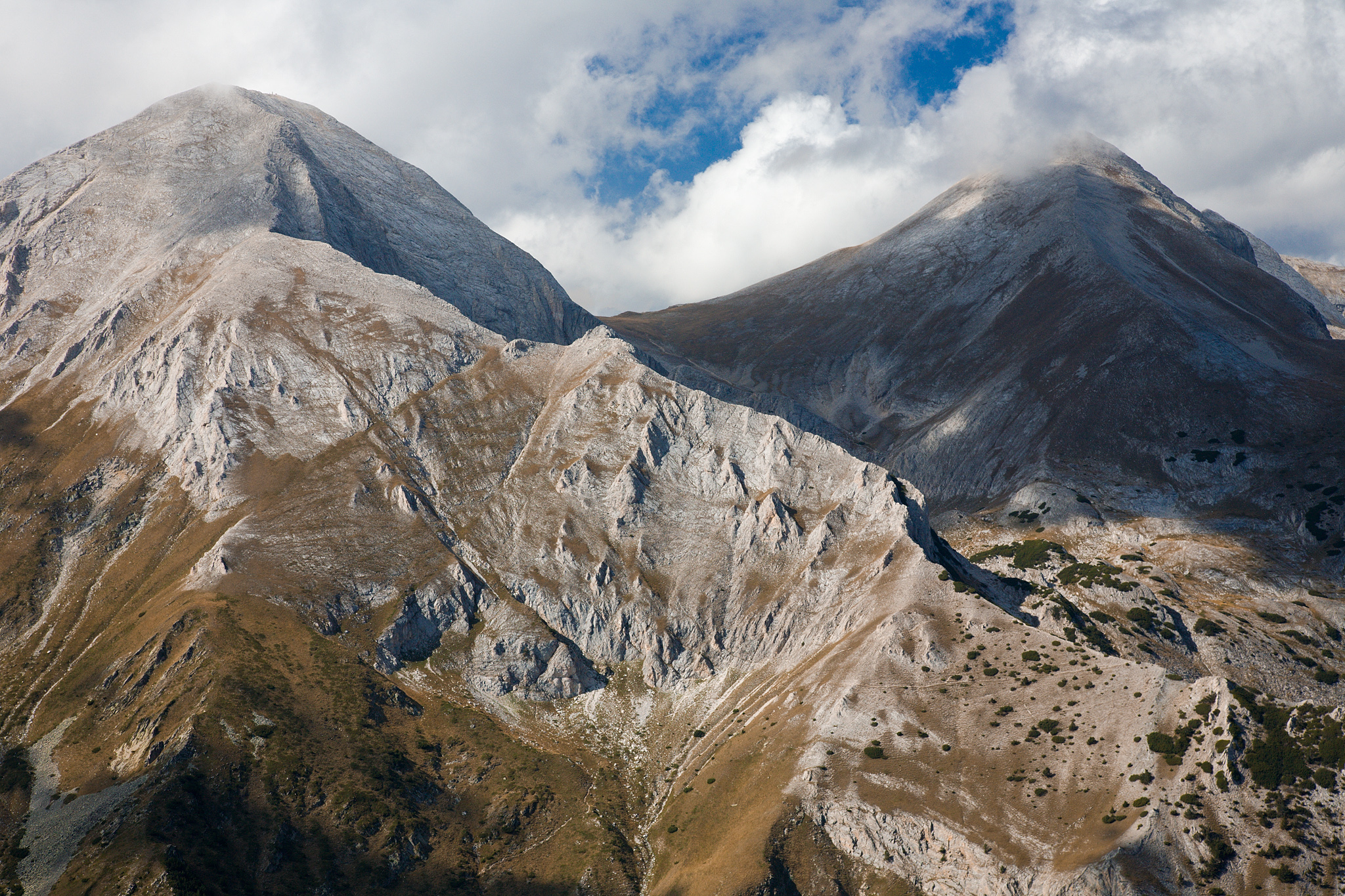
The Pirin, a mountain range in Bulgaria

Mountains are features that usually rise at least 300 metres (980 ft) higher than the surrounding terrain. The formation of mountain belts is called orogenesis, and results from plate tectonics. For example, where a plate at a convergent plate boundary pushes one plate above the other, mountains could be formed by either collisional events, such that Earth's crust is pushed upwards, or subductional events, where Earth's crust is pushed into the mantle, causing the crust to melt, rise due to its low density, and solidify into hardened rock, thickening the crust.

A plateau, also called a high plain or a tableland, is an area of a highland consisting of flat terrain that is raised sharply above the surrounding area on at least one side, creating steep cliffs or escarpments. Both volcanic activity – such as the upwelling of magma and extrusion of lava – and erosion of mountains caused by water, glaciers, or aeolian processes can create plateaus. Plateaus are classified according to their surrounding environment as intermontane, piedmont, or continental. A few plateaus may have a small flat top, while others are wider. Buttes are smaller, with less extrusive and more intrusive igneous rock, while plateaus or highlands are the widest, and mesas are a general-sized plateau with horizontal bedrock strata.

=== Plains and valleys ===
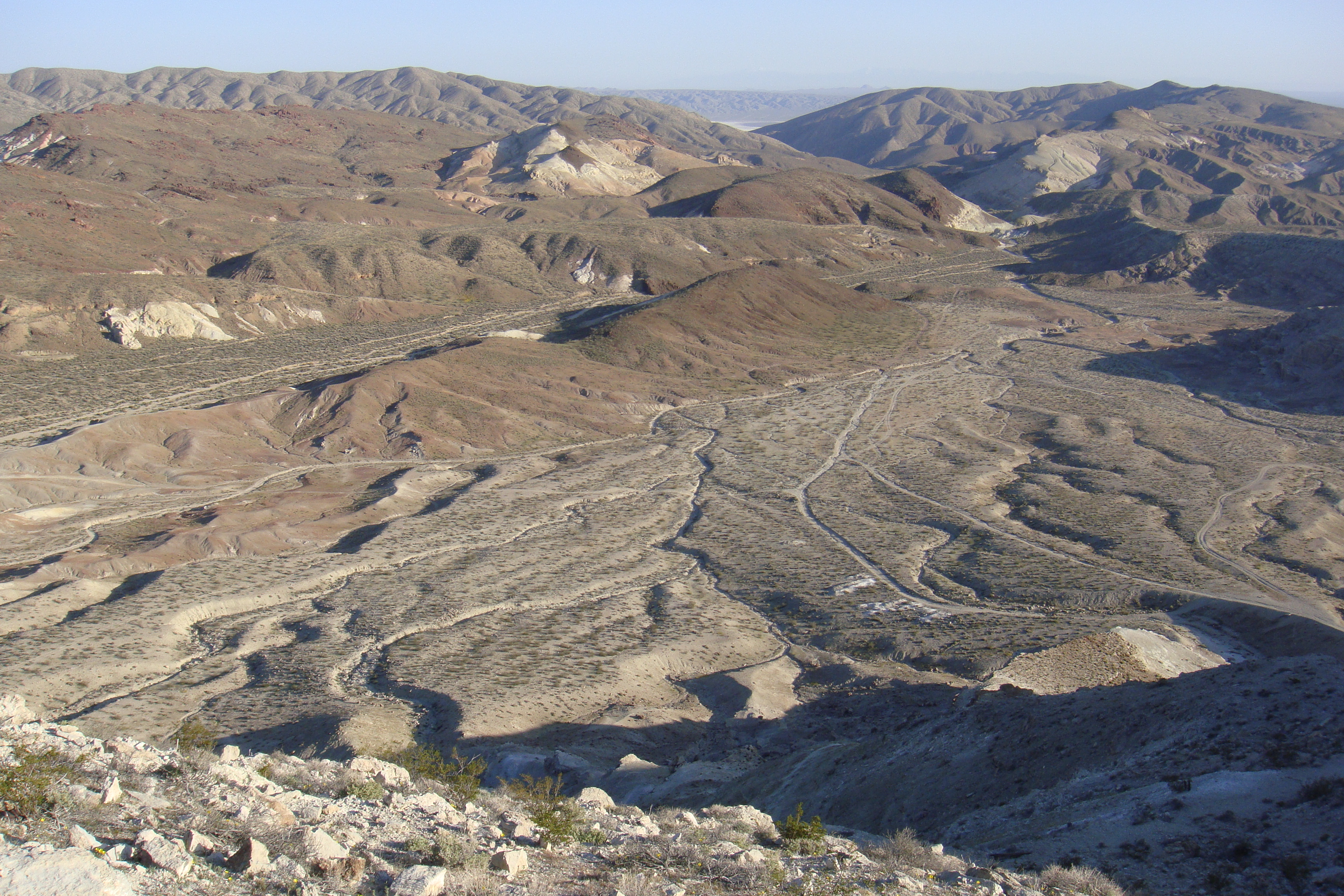
A small, incised alluvial plain from Red Rock Canyon State Park (California)

Wide, flat areas of land are called plains, which cover more than one-third of Earth's land area. When they occur as lowered areas between mountains, they can create valleys, canyons (or gorges), and ravines. A plateau can be thought of as an elevated plain. Plains are known to have fertile soils and be important for agriculture due to their flatness supporting grasses suitable for livestock and facilitating the harvest of crops. Floodplains provided agricultural land for some of the earliest civilizations. Erosion is often a main driver for the creation of plains and valleys, with rift valleys being a noticeable exception. Fjords are glacial valleys that can be thousands of meters deep, opening out to the sea.

=== Caves and craters ===
Any natural void in the ground that can be entered by a human can be considered a cave. They have been important to humans as a place of shelter since the dawn of humanity.

Craters are depressions in the ground, but unlike caves, they do not provide shelter or extend underground. There are many kinds of craters, such as impact craters, volcanic calderas, and isostatic depressions. Karst processes can create both solution caves, the most frequent cave type, and craters, as seen in karst sinkholes.

== Layers ==
The pedosphere is the outermost layer of Earth's continental surface and is composed of soil and subject to soil formation processes. Below it, the lithosphere encompasses both Earth's crust and the uppermost layer of the mantle. The lithosphere rests, or "floats", on top of the mantle below it via isostasy. Above the solid ground, the troposphere and humans' use of land can be considered layers of the land.

=== Land cover ===
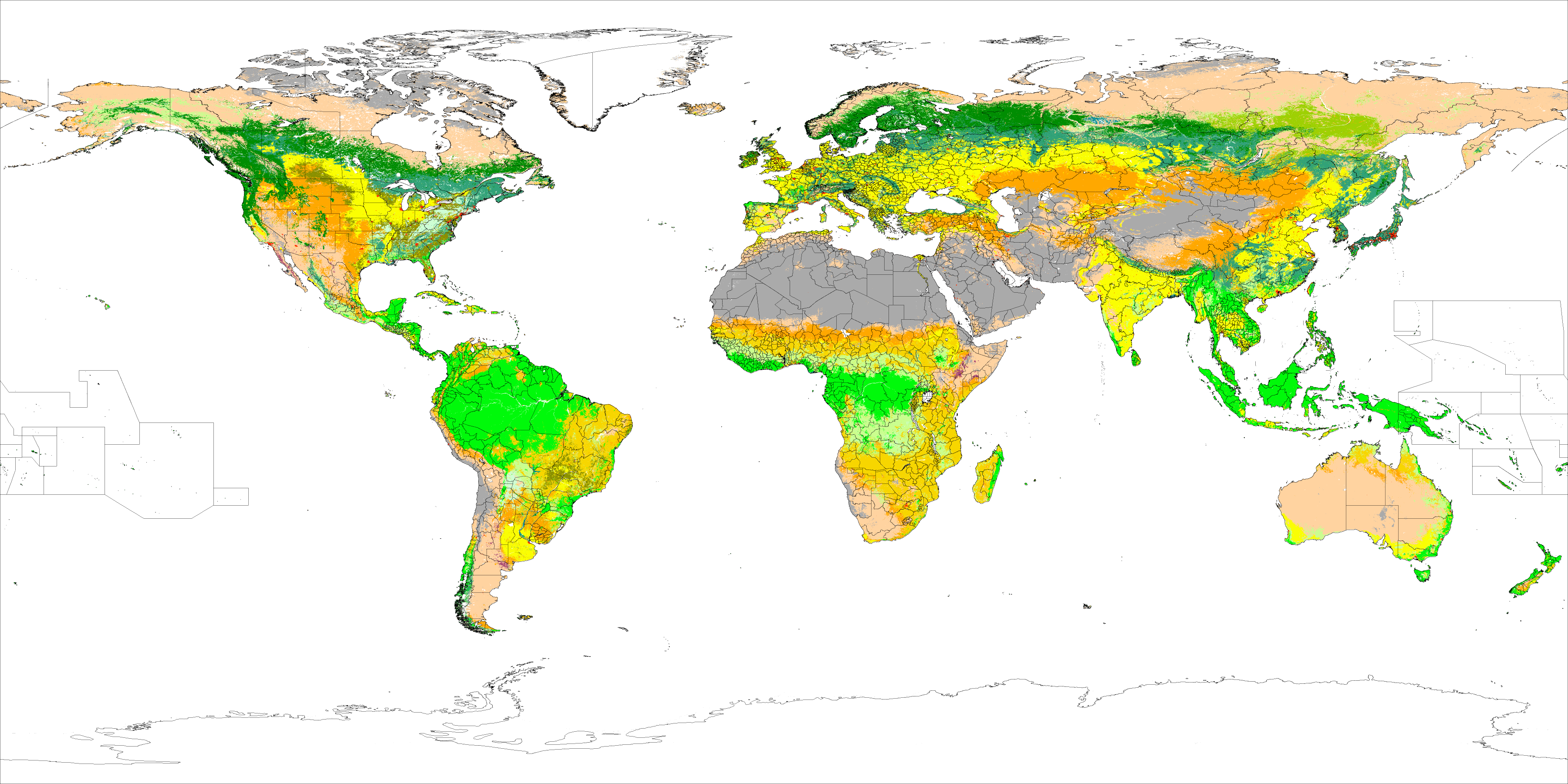
Land cover as classified by the International Geosphere-Biosphere Programme (IGBP) into 17 classes

Land cover refers to the material physically present on the land surface, for example, woody crops, herbaceous crops, barren land, and shrub-covered areas. Artificial surfaces (including cities) account for about a third of a percent of all land. Land use refers to human allocation of land for various purposes, including farming, ranching, and recreation (e.g., national parks); worldwide, there are an estimated 16.7 million km^{2} (6.4 million sq mi) of cropland, and 33.5 million km^{2} (12.9 million sq mi) of pastureland.

Land cover change detection using remote sensing and geospatial data provides baseline information for assessing the climate change impacts on habitats and biodiversity, as well as natural resources, in the target areas. Land cover change detection and mapping is a key component of interdisciplinary land change science, which uses it to determine the consequences of land change on climate. Land change modeling is used to predict and analyze changes in land cover and use.

=== Soil ===
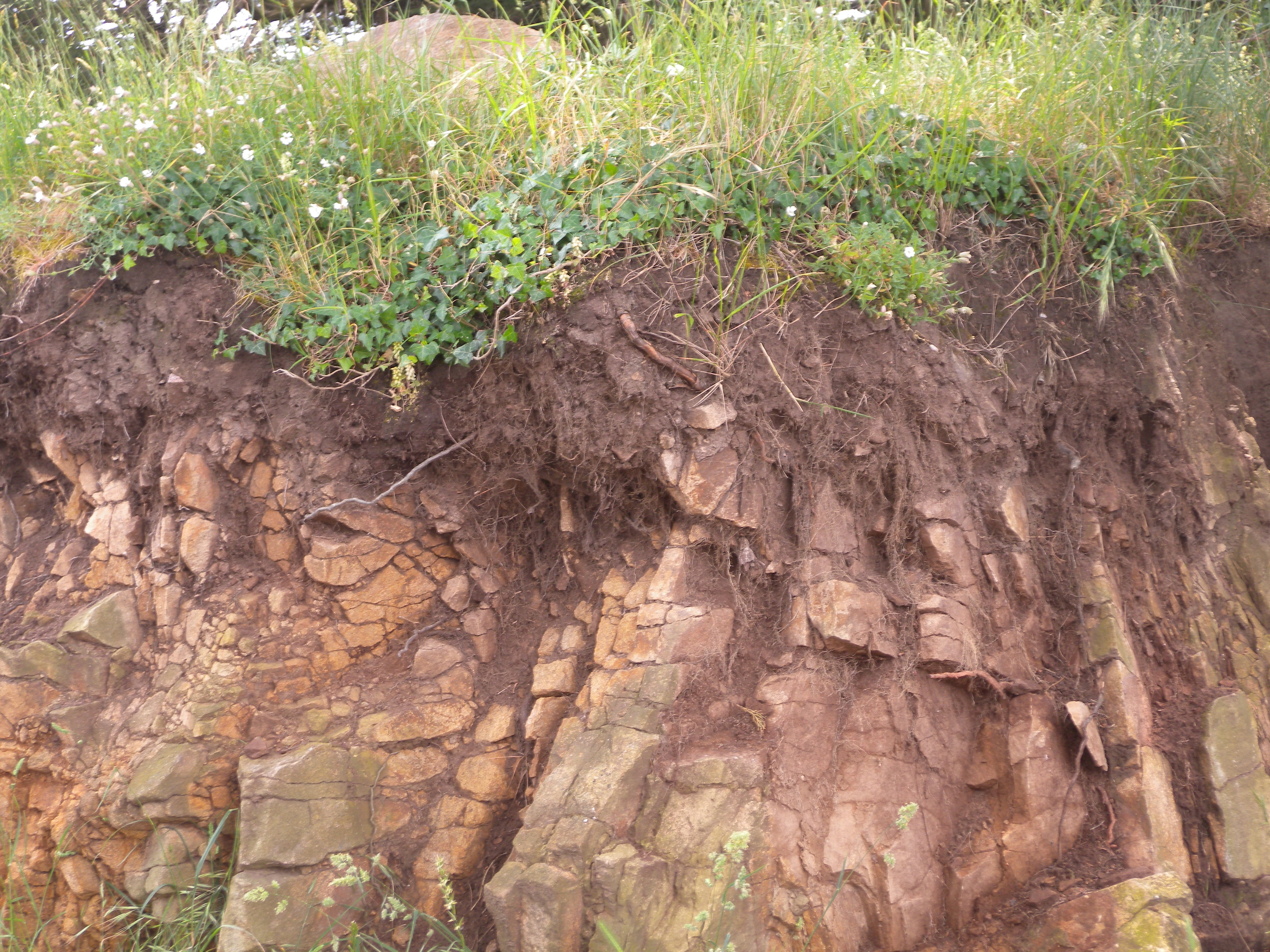
Cross section of rankers soil, with plants and protruding roots near the top

Soil is a mixture of organic matter, minerals, gases, liquids, and organisms that together support life. Soil consists of a solid phase of minerals and organic matter (the soil matrix), as well as a porous phase that holds gases (the soil atmosphere) and water (the soil solution). Accordingly, soil is a three-state system of solids, liquids, and gases. Soil is a product of several factors: the influence of climate, relief (elevation, orientation, and slope of terrain), organisms, and the soil's parent materials (original minerals) interacting over time. It continually undergoes development by way of numerous physical, chemical and biological processes, which include weathering and erosion.

Given its complexity and strong internal connectedness, soil ecologists regard soil as an ecosystem. Soil acts as an engineering medium, a habitat for soil organisms, a recycling system for nutrients and organic wastes, a regulator of water quality, a modifier of atmospheric composition, and a medium for plant growth, making it a critically important provider of ecosystem services. Since soil has a tremendous range of available niches and habitats, it contains a prominent part of the Earth's genetic diversity. A gram of soil can contain billions of organisms, belonging to thousands of species, mostly microbial and largely still unexplored.

Soil is a major component of the Earth's ecosystem. The world's ecosystems are impacted in far-reaching ways by the processes carried out in the soil, with effects ranging from ozone depletion and global warming to rainforest destruction and water pollution. With respect to Earth's carbon cycle, soil acts as an important carbon reservoir, and it is potentially one of the most reactive to human disturbance and climate change. As the planet warms, it has been predicted that soils will add carbon dioxide to the atmosphere due to increased biological activity at higher temperatures, a positive feedback (amplification). This prediction has, however, been questioned in consideration of more recent knowledge on soil carbon turnover.

=== Continental crust ===
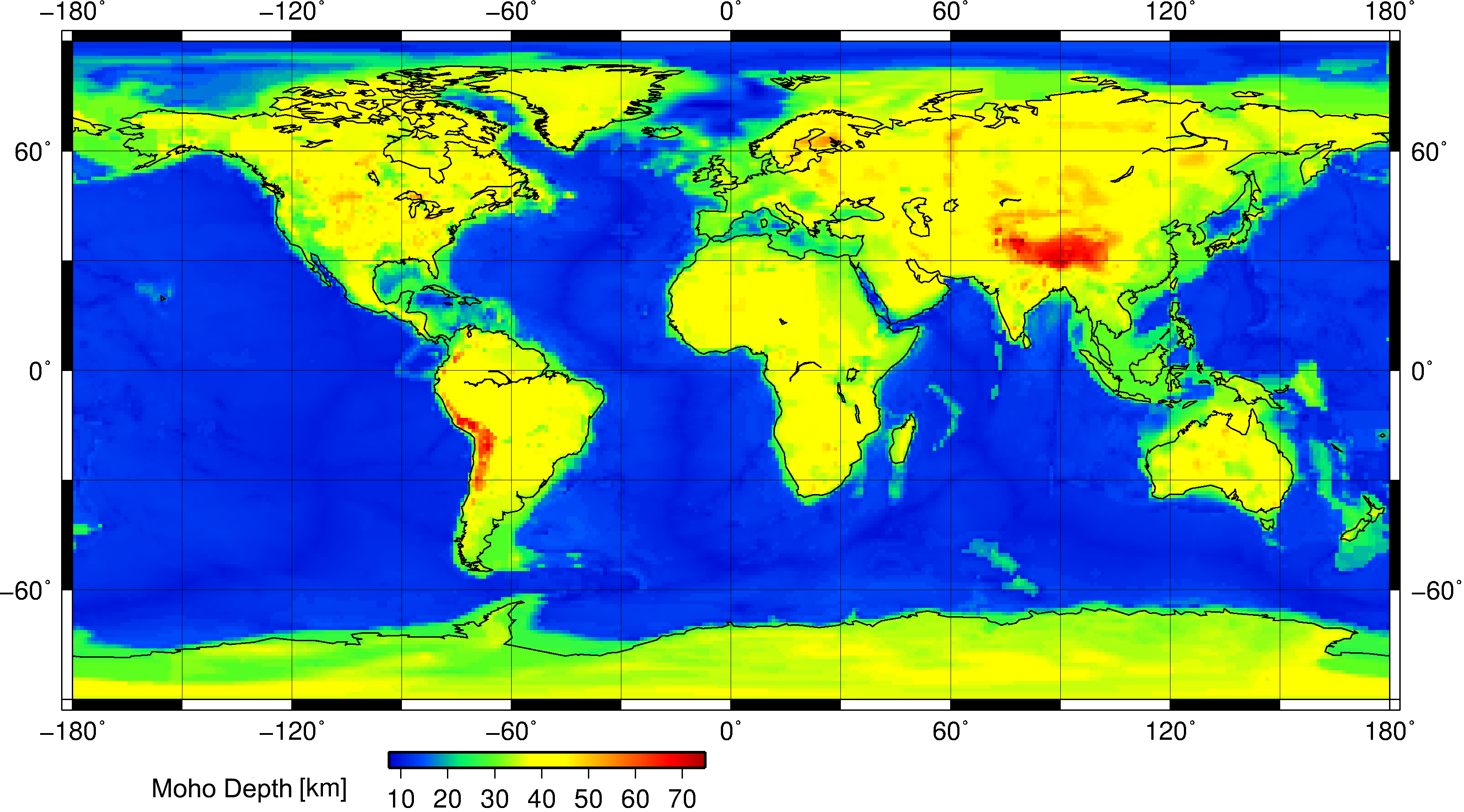
Map of the Mohorovičić discontinuity's depth from the surface, indicating the thickness of the Earth's crust.

Continental crust is the layer of igneous, sedimentary, and metamorphic rocks that forms the geological continents and the areas of shallow seabed close to their shores, known as continental shelves. This layer is sometimes called sial because its bulk composition is richer in aluminium silicate and has a lower density compared to the oceanic crust, called sima, which is richer in magnesium silicate. Changes in seismic wave velocities have shown that at a certain depth (the Conrad discontinuity), there is a reasonably sharp contrast between the more felsic upper continental crust and the lower continental crust, which is more mafic in character.

The composition of land is not uniform across the Earth, varying between locations and between strata within the same location. The most prominent components of upper continental crust include silicon dioxide, aluminium oxide, and magnesium. The continental crust consists of lower-density material such as the igneous rocks granite and andesite. Less common is basalt, a denser volcanic rock that is the primary constituent of the ocean floors. Sedimentary rock is formed from the accumulation of sediment that becomes buried and compacted together. Nearly 75% of the continental surfaces are covered by sedimentary rocks, although they form about 5% of the crust.

The most abundant silicate minerals on Earth's surface include quartz, feldspars, amphibole, mica, pyroxene and olivine. Common carbonate minerals include calcite (found in limestone) and dolomite. The rock that makes up land is thicker than oceanic crust, and it is far more varied in terms of composition. About 31% of this continental crust is submerged in shallow water, forming continental shelves.

== Life science ==
Land provides many ecosystem services, such as mitigating climate change, regulating water supply through drainage basins and river systems, and supporting food production. Land resources are finite, which has led to regulations intended to safeguard these ecosystem services and to a set of practices called sustainable land management.

=== Land biomes ===
Forest area as a percentage of land area, by region, 2025.

A biome is an area "characterized by its vegetation, soil, climate, and wildlife." There are five major types of biomes on land: grasslands, forests, deserts, tundras, and freshwater. Other types of biomes include shrublands, (Note: World Wildlife Fund's definition of 14 biomes includes Temperate grasslands, savannas and shrublands, Mediterranean forests, woodlands, and scrub, and Deserts and xeric shrublands.) wetlands, (Note: World Wildlife Fund's definition of 14 biomes includes flooded grasslands and savannas, and mangroves, which are both wetlands.) and polar ice caps. An ecosystem refers to the interaction between organisms within a particular environment, and a habitat refers to the environment where a given species or population of organisms lives. Biomes may span more than one continent, and contain a variety of ecosystems and habitats.

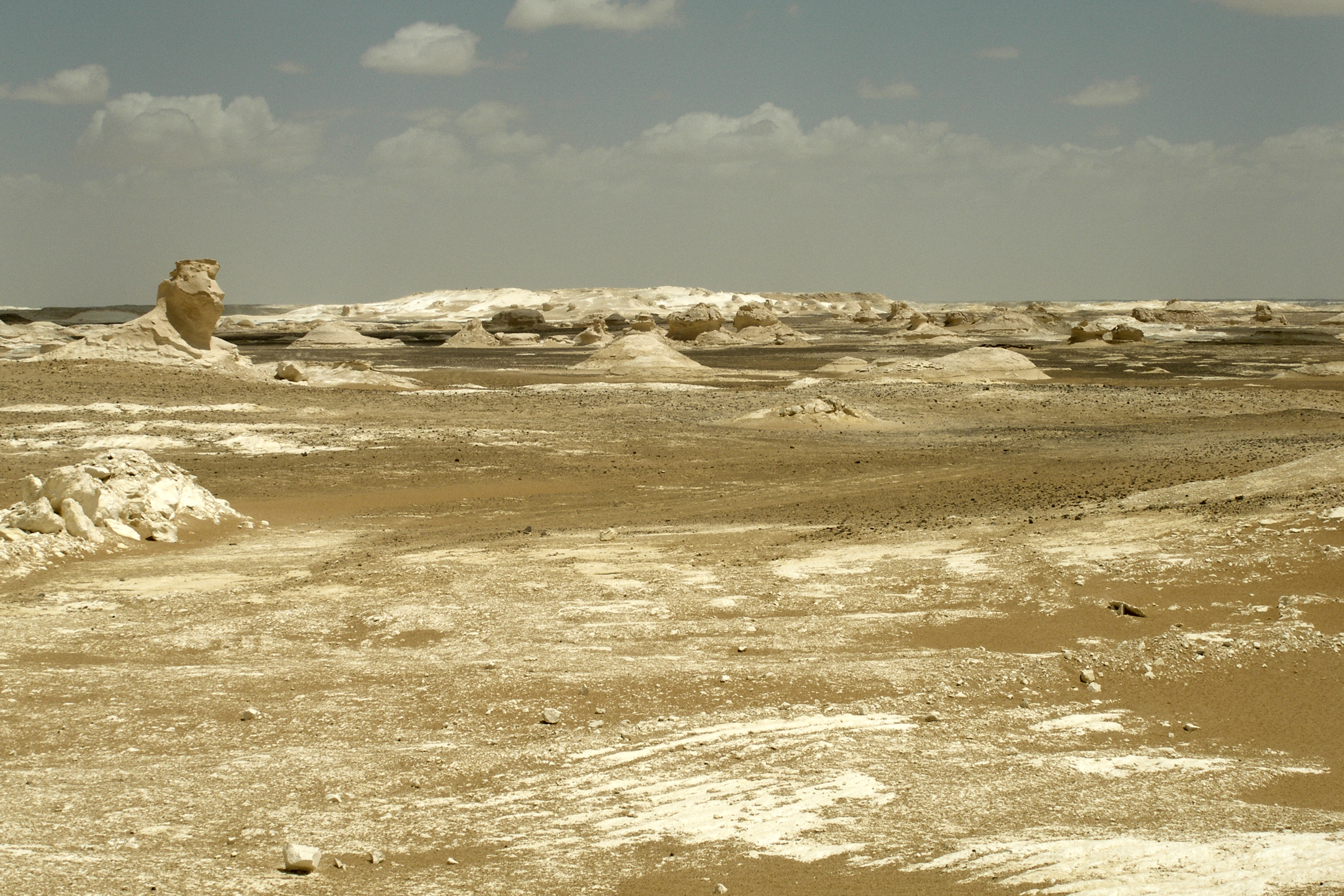
White Desert National Park in Egypt

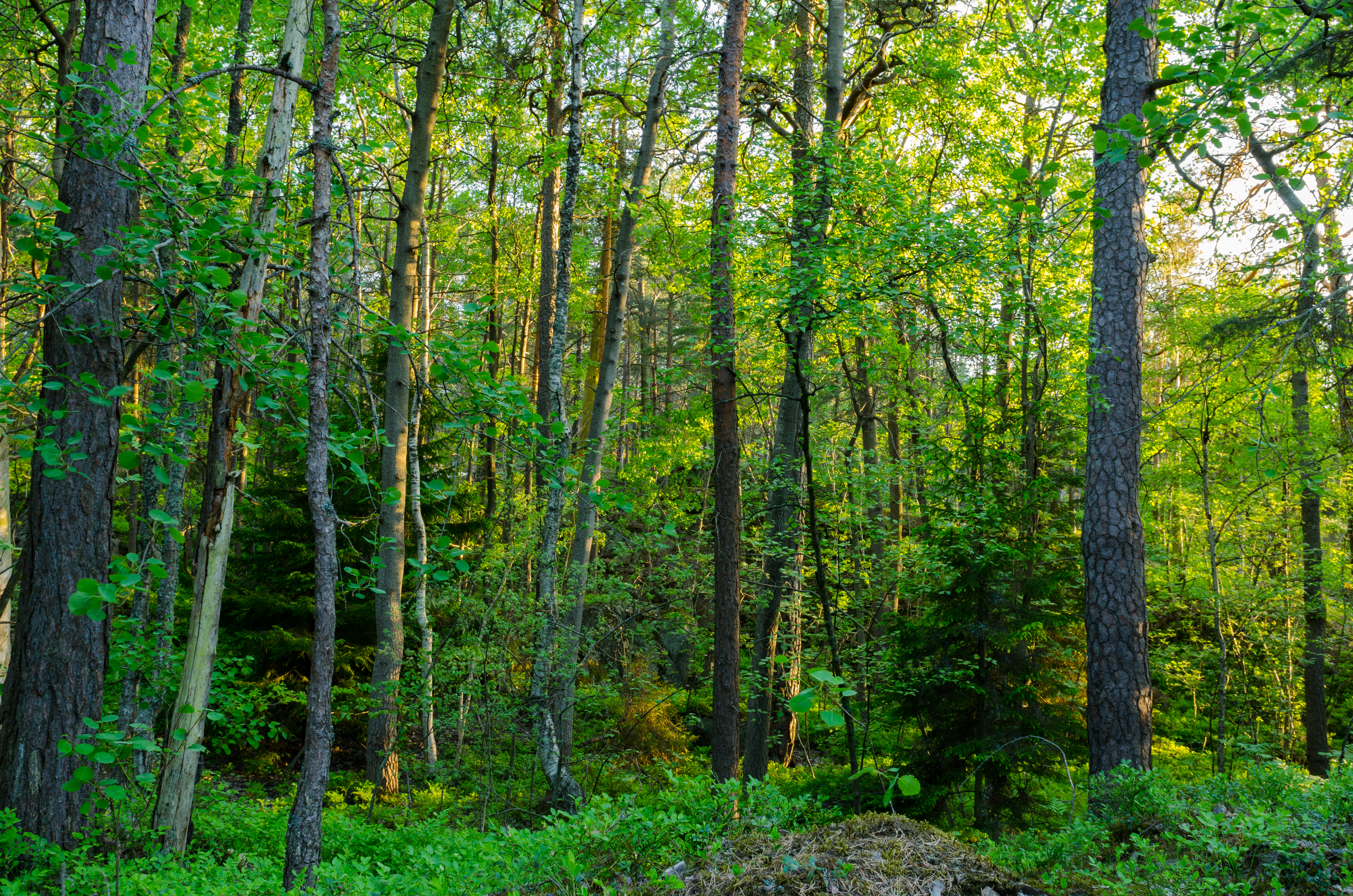
A forest in Ryssbergen, Sweden

- Deserts have an arid climate, generally defined to mean that they receive less than 25 centimetres (9.8 in) of precipitation per year. They make up around one fifth of the Earth's land area, are found on every continent, and can be very hot or very cold (see polar desert). They are home to animals and plants which evolved to be tolerant of droughts. In deserts, most erosion is caused by running water, usually during violent thunderstorms, which cause flash floods. Deserts are expanding due to desertification, which is caused by excessive deforestation and overgrazing.
- Tundra is a biome where tree growth is hindered by frigid temperatures and short growing seasons. There are types of tundra associated with different regions: Arctic tundra, alpine tundra, and Antarctic tundra.
- A forest is an area of land dominated by trees. Many definitions of "forest" are used throughout the world, incorporating factors such as tree density, tree height, land use, legal standing, and ecological function. The United Nations' Food and Agriculture Organization (FAO) defines a forest as: "land spanning more than 0.5 hectares with trees higher than 5 meters and a canopy cover of more than 10 per cent, or trees able to reach these thresholds in situ. It does not include land that is predominantly under agricultural or urban use." Types of forests include rainforests, deciduous forests, and boreal forests.
- Grasslands are areas where the vegetation is dominated by grasses (Poaceae). However, sedge (Cyperaceae) and rush (Juncaceae) can also be found, along with variable proportions of legumes like clover and other herbs. Grasslands occur naturally on all continents except Antarctica and are found in most ecoregions of the Earth. Furthermore, grasslands are one of the largest biomes on Earth and dominate the landscape worldwide. Types include natural, semi-natural, and agricultural grasslands. Savannas are grasslands with occasional, scattered trees.

=== Fauna and flora ===
Land plants evolved from green algae, and they are called embryophytes. They include trees, shrubs, ferns, grass, moss, and flowers. Most plants are vascular plants, meaning that their tissues distribute water and minerals throughout the plant. Through photosynthesis, most plants nourish themselves with sunlight and water, breathing in carbon dioxide and breathing out oxygen. Between 20 and 50% of oxygen is produced by land vegetation.

Unlike plants, terrestrial animals are not a monophyletic group—that is, a group including all terrestrial animals does not encompass all lineages from a common ancestor. This is because there are organisms, such as the whale, that evolved from terrestrial mammals back to an aquatic lifestyle. Many megafauna of the past, such as non-avian dinosaurs, have become extinct due to extinction events, e.g., the Quaternary extinction event.

== Humans and land ==
Land is "deeply intertwined with human development." It is a crucial resource for human survival; humans depend on land for subsistence, and they can develop strong symbolic attachments to it. Access to land can determine "survival and wealth," particularly in developing countries, giving rise to complex power relationships in production and consumption. Most of the world's philosophies and religions recognize a human duty of stewardship towards land and nature.

=== Culture ===
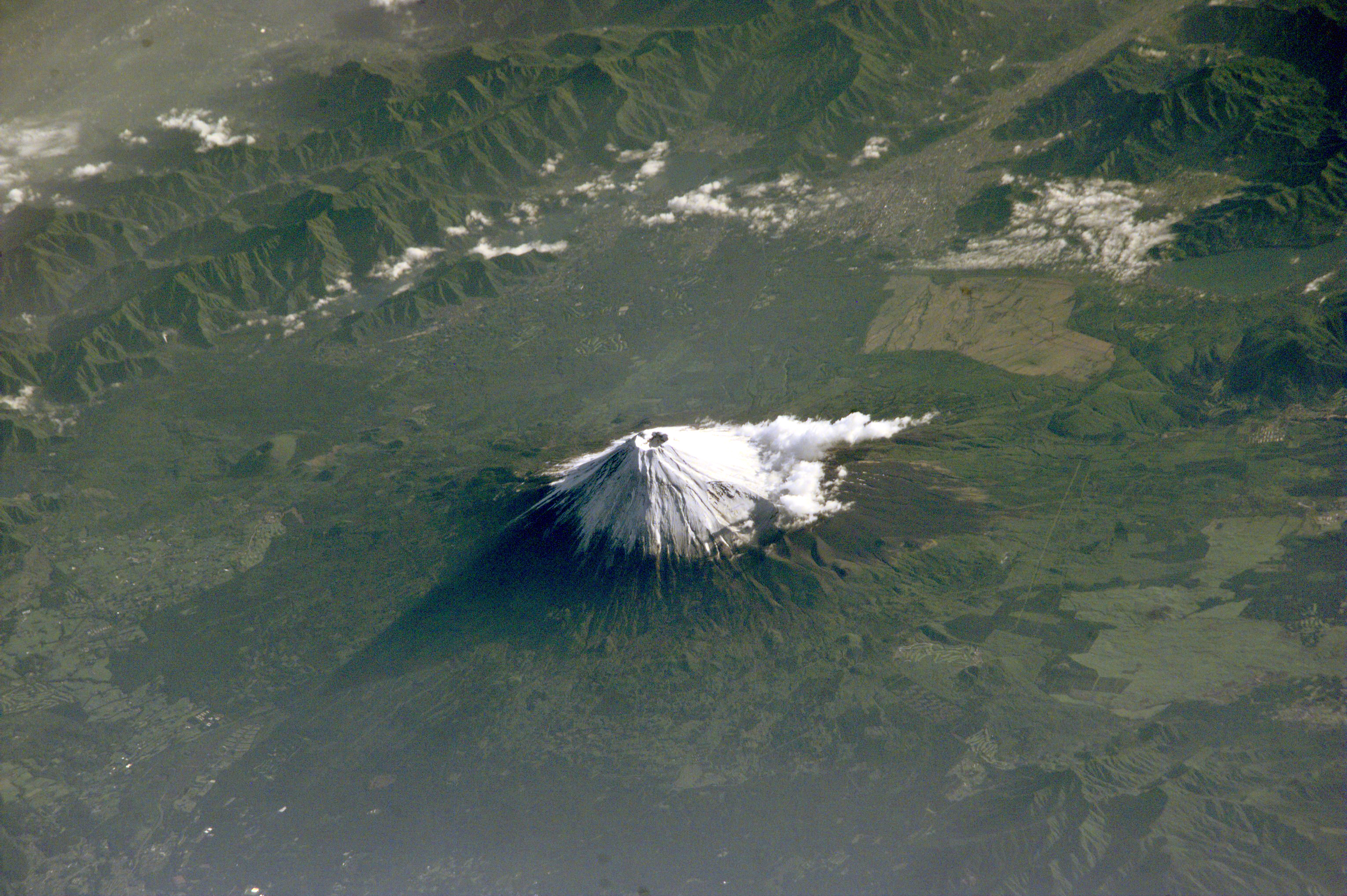
Mount Fuji in early summer seen from the International Space Station. Mount Fuji is a geological feature of the land that is of great cultural and religious significance.

Many humans see land as a source of "spirituality, inspiration, and beauty." Many also derive a sense of belonging from land, especially if it also belonged to their ancestors. Various religions teach about a connection between humans and the land (such as veneration of Bhumi, a personification of the Earth in Hinduism, and the obligation to protect land as hima in Islam), and in almost every Indigenous group there are etiological stories about the land they live on. For Indigenous peoples, connection to the land is an important part of their identity and culture, and some religious groups consider a particular area of land to be sacred, such as the Holy Land in the Abrahamic religions.

Creation myths in many religions involve stories of the creation of the world by a supernatural deity or deities, including accounts wherein the land is separated from the oceans and the air. The Earth itself has often been personified as a deity, in particular a goddess. In many cultures, the mother goddess is also portrayed as a fertility deity. To the Aztecs, Earth was called Tonantzin—"our mother"; to the Incas, Earth was called Pachamama—"mother earth". In Norse mythology, the Earth giantess Jörð was the mother of Thor and the daughter of Annar. Ancient Egyptian mythology is different from that of other cultures because Earth (Geb) is male and the sky (Nut) is female.

Ancient Near Eastern cultures conceived of the world as a flat disk of land surrounded by ocean. The Pyramid Texts and Coffin Texts reveal that the ancient Egyptians believed Nun (the ocean) was a circular body surrounding nbwt (a term meaning "dry lands" or "islands"). The Hebrew Bible, drawing on other Near Eastern ideas, depicts the Earth as a flat disc floating on water, with another expanse of water above it. A similar model is found in the Homeric account of the 8th century BC in which "Okeanos, the personified body of water surrounding the circular surface of the Earth, is the begetter of all life and possibly of all gods."

The spherical form of the Earth was suggested by early Greek philosophers, a belief espoused by Pythagoras. Contrary to popular belief, most educated people in the Middle Ages did not believe the Earth was flat: this misconception is often called the "Myth of the Flat Earth". As evidenced by thinkers such as Thomas Aquinas, the European belief in a spherical Earth was widespread by this point in time. Prior to circumnavigation of the planet and the introduction of space flight, belief in a spherical Earth was based on observations of the secondary effects of the Earth's shape and parallels drawn with the shape of other planets.

=== Travel ===
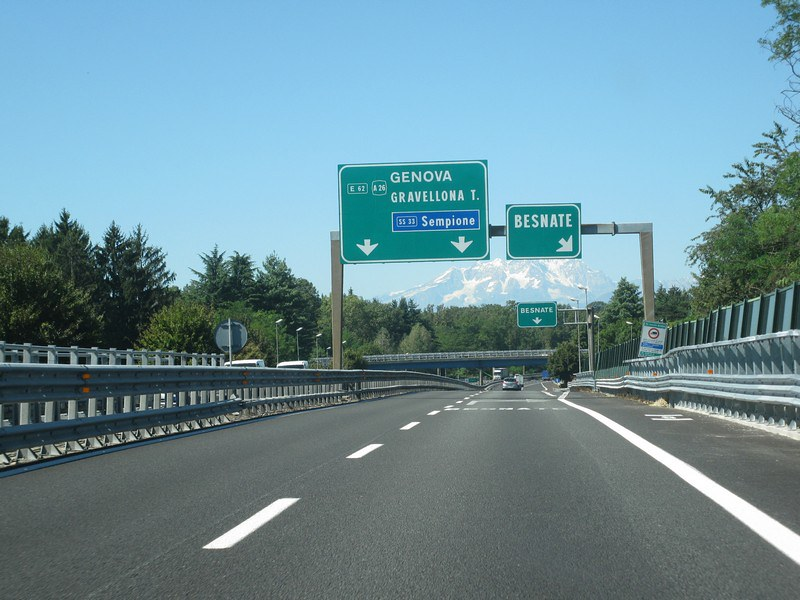
The Autostrada dei Laghi ("Lakes Motorway"; part of the A8 and A9), Italy, the first motorway built in the world.

Humans have commonly traveled for business, pleasure, discovery, and adventure, all made easier in recent human history as a result of technologies like cars, trains, planes, and ships. Land navigation is an aspect of travel and refers to progressing through unfamiliar terrain using navigational tools like maps with references to terrain, a compass, or satellite navigation. Navigation on land is often facilitated by reference to landmarks – enduring and recognizable natural or artificial features that stand out from their nearby environment and are often visible from long distances. Natural landmarks can be characteristic features, such as mountains or plateaus, with examples including Table Mountain in South Africa, Mount Ararat in Turkey, the Grand Canyon in the United States, Uluru in Australia, and Mount Fuji in Japan.

Two major eras of exploration occurred in human history: one of divergence, and one of convergence. The former saw humans moving out of Africa, settling in new lands, and developing distinct cultures in relative isolation. Early explorers settled in Europe and Asia; 14,000 years ago, some crossed the Ice Age land bridge from Siberia to Alaska and moved southbound to settle in the Americas. For the most part, these cultures were ignorant of each other's existence. The second period, occurring over roughly the last 10,000 years, saw increased cross-cultural exchange through trade and exploration, marking a new era of cultural intermingling.

=== Trade ===
Human trade has occurred since the prehistoric era. Peter Watson dates the history of long-distance commerce from c. 150,000 years ago. Major trade routes throughout history have existed on land, such as the Silk Road which linked East Asia with Europe, and the Amber Road which was used to transfer amber from Northern Europe to the Mediterranean Sea. The Dark Ages led trade to collapse in the West, but it continued to flourish among the kingdoms of Africa, the Middle East, India, China, and Southeast Asia. During the Middle Ages, Central Asia was the economic centre of the world, and luxury goods were commonly traded in Europe. Physical money (either barter or precious metals) was dangerous to carry over a long distance. To address this, a burgeoning banking industry enabled the shift to movable wealth or capital, making it far easier and safer to trade across long distances. After the Age of Sail, international trade mostly occurred along sea routes, notably to prevent intermediary countries from being able to control trade routes and the flow of goods.

In economics, land refers to a factor of production. It can be leased in exchange for rent and the use of its various raw material resources (trees, oil, metals).

=== Land use ===
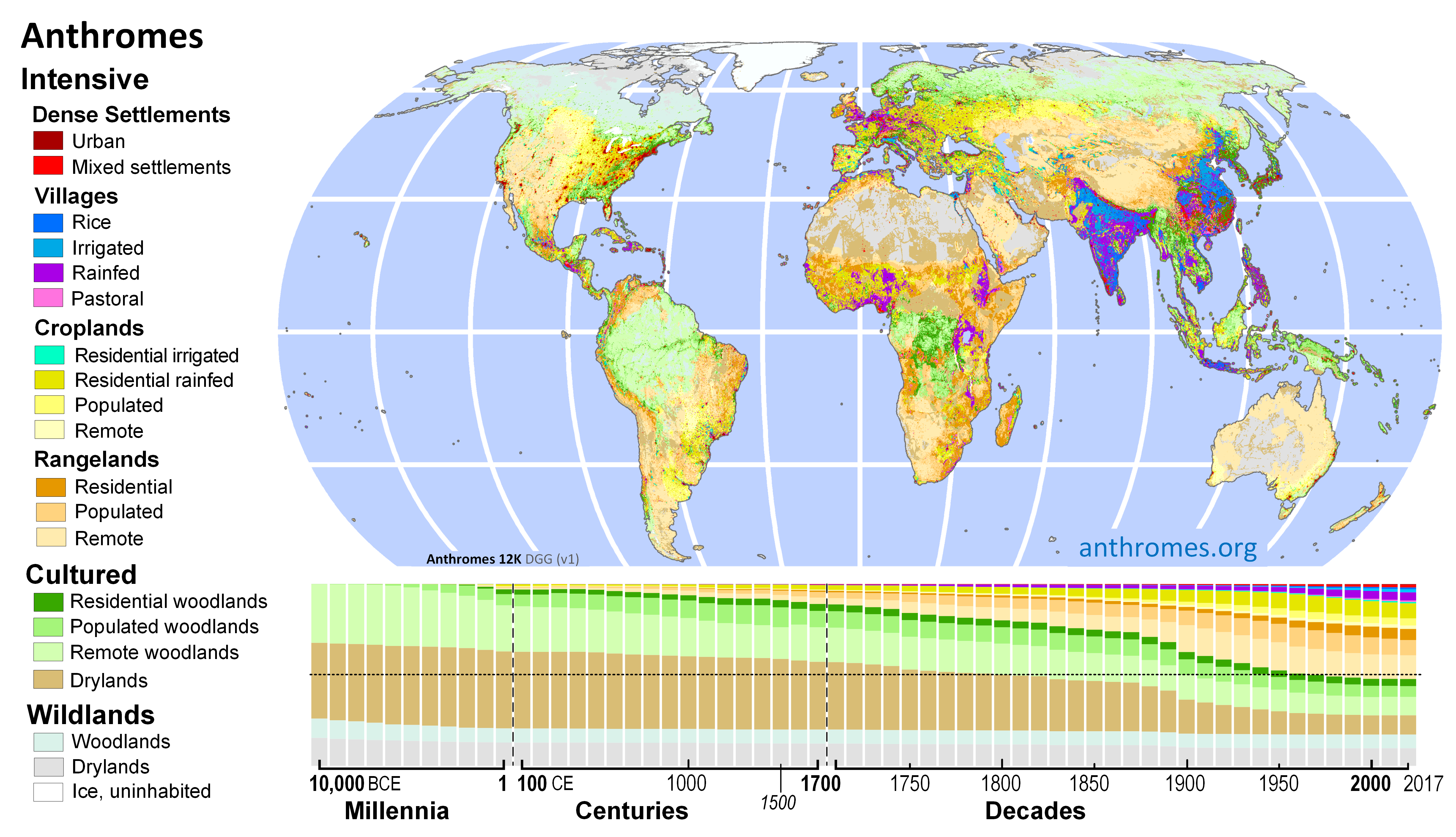
World map of land use as of 2017. A historical distribution of land use, beginning at 10,000 BCE, is shown at the bottom-right.

Land is the foundation of agriculture, supporting over 95% of food production while providing essential ecosystem services that sustain life on Earth. As a finite resource, agricultural land faces pressures from competing demands including urban expansion, biofuel production, and changing consumption patterns driven by rising incomes and shifting diets. Land is the basis of food security, biodiversity conservation, climate regulation and – in 2025 – the livelihoods of 892 million agricultural workers worldwide.

For more than 10,000 years, humans have engaged in activities on land such as hunting, foraging, controlled burning, land clearing, and agriculture. Beginning with the Neolithic Revolution and the spread of agriculture around the world, human land use has significantly altered terrestrial ecosystems, with an essentially global transformation of Earth's landscape by 3000 years ago. From around 1750, human land use has increased at an accelerating rate due to the Industrial Revolution, which created a greater demand for natural resources and caused rapid population growth.

Agriculture includes both crop farming and animal husbandry. A third of Earth's land surface is used for agriculture, with an estimated 16.7 million km^{2} (6.4 million sq mi) of cropland and 33.5 million km^{2} (12.9 million sq mi) of pastureland. This has had significant impacts on Earth's ecosystems. When land is cleared to make way for agriculture, native flora and fauna are replaced with newly introduced crops and livestock. Excessively high agricultural land use is driven by poor management practices (which lead to lower food yields, necessitating more land use), food demand, food waste, and diets high in meat.

Urbanization has led to greater population growth in urban areas in the last century. Although urban areas make up less than 3 percent of Earth's land area, the global population shifted from a majority living in rural areas to a majority living in urban areas in 2007. People living in urban areas depend on food produced in rural areas outside of their cities, which creates greater demand for agriculture and drives land use change well beyond city boundaries. Urbanization also displaces agricultural land because it mainly takes place on the most fertile land. Urban expansion in peri-urban areas fragments agricultural and natural lands, forcing agriculture to move to less fertile land elsewhere. Because this land is less fertile, more land is needed for the same output, which increases the total agricultural land use.

Another form of land use is mining, whereby minerals are extracted from the ground using a variety of methods. Evidence of mining activity dates back to around 3000 BCE in Ancient Egypt. Important minerals include iron ore, mined for use as a raw material; coal, mined for energy production; and gemstones, mined for use in jewellery and currency.

=== Land ownership and reform ===
Ownership of agricultural land and its distribution among the population is a key driver of a wide range of social, political and economic inequalities. Land reform (also known as agrarian reform) refers to the process of changing who owns agricultural land and who has the right to use these lands. Redistributive land reform refers to the narrower concept of transferring agricultural land ownership from large private landowners to small farmers and people without any landholdings. It involves the redistribution of wealth and political power that comes from owning large swathes of land. There are different types of land reform, including state-led and market-led agrarian reforms.

=== Law ===
The phrase "the law of the land" first appeared in 1215 in Magna Carta, inspiring its later usage in the United States Constitution. The idea of common land also originated with medieval English law, and refers to collective ownership of land, treating it as a common good. In environmental science, economics, and game theory, the tragedy of the commons refers to individuals' use of common spaces for their own gain, deteriorating the land overall by taking more than their fair share and not cooperating with others. The idea of common land suggests public ownership; but there is still some land that can be privatized as property for an individual, such as a landlord or king. In the developed world, land is expected to be privately owned by an individual with legal title, but in the developing world the right to use land is often divided, with the rights to land resources being given to different people at different times for the same area of land. Beginning in the late 20th century, the international community has begun to recognise Indigenous land rights in law, for example, the Treaty of Waitangi for Māori people, the Act on Greenland Self-Government for Inuit, and the Indigenous Peoples Rights Act in the Philippines.

=== Geopolitics ===
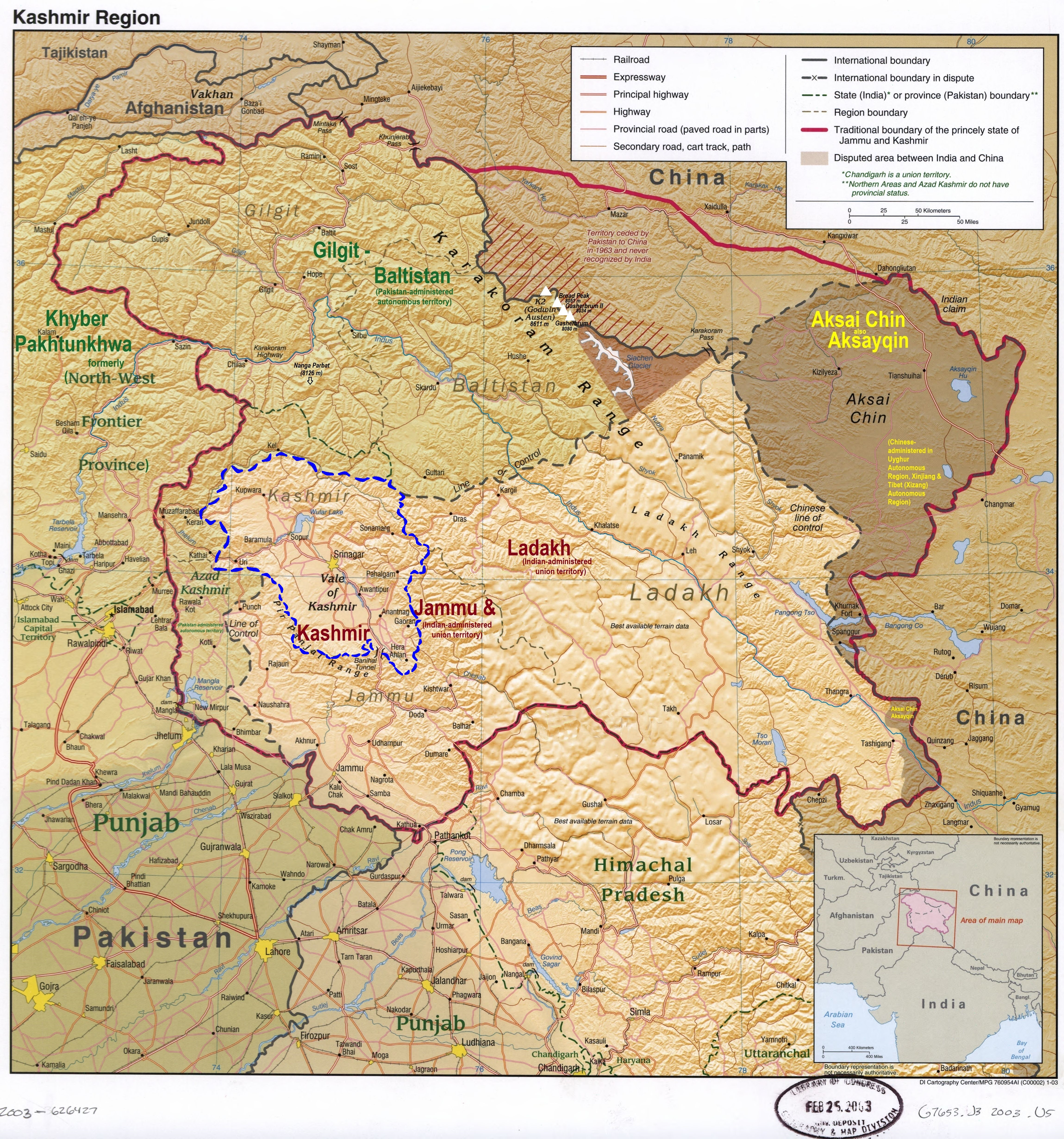
A map of Kashmir, showing border disputes between China, India, and Pakistan. Undisputed borders between the three countries are also visible.

Borders are geographical boundaries imposed either by geographic features (oceans, mountain ranges, rivers) or by political entities (governments, states, or subnational entities). Political borders can be established through warfare, colonization, or mutual agreements between the political entities that reside in those areas; the creation of these agreements is called boundary delimitation.

Many wars and other conflicts have occurred in efforts by participants to expand the land under their control, or to assert control of a specific area considered to hold strategic, historical, or cultural significance. The Mongol Empire of the 13th and 14th centuries became the largest contiguous land empire in history through war and conquest.

In the 19th-century United States, a concept of manifest destiny was developed by various groups, asserting that American settlers were destined to expand across North America. This concept was used to justify military action against the indigenous peoples of North America and of Mexico.

The aggression of Nazi Germany in World War II was motivated in part by the concept of Lebensraum ("living space"), which had first become a geopolitical goal of Imperial Germany in World War I (1914–1918), originally as the core element of the Septemberprogramm of territorial expansion. The most extreme form of this ideology was supported by the Nazi Party (NSDAP). Lebensraum was one of the leading motivations Nazi Germany had in initiating World War II, and it would continue this policy until the end of World War II.

== Environmental issues ==
Temperature change, measured over land by region

Land degradation is "the reduction or loss of the biological or economic productivity and complexity" of land as a result of human activity. Land degradation is driven by many different activities, including agriculture, urbanization, energy production, and mining. Humans have altered more than three-quarters of ice-free land through habitation and other use, fundamentally changing ecosystems. Human activity is a major factor in the Holocene extinction, and human-caused climate change is causing rising sea levels and ecosystem loss. Environmental scientists study land ecosystems, natural resources, the biosphere (fauna and flora), troposphere, and the impact of human activity on these. Their recommendations have led to international action to prevent biodiversity loss and desertification, and encourage sustainable forest and waste management. The conservation movement lobbies for the protection of endangered species and the protection of natural areas, such as parks. International frameworks have focused on analyzing how humans can meet their needs while using land more efficiently and preserving its natural resources, notably under the United Nations' Sustainable Development Goals framework.

=== Soil degradation ===
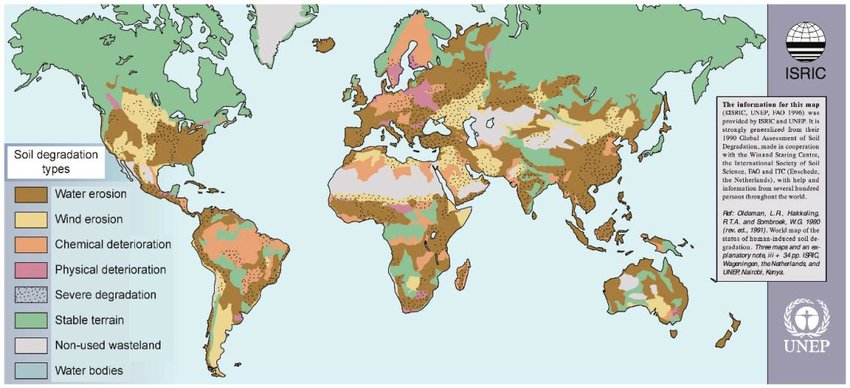
World map of soil degradation

Human land use can cause soil to degrade, both in quality and in quantity. Soil degradation can be caused by agrochemicals (such as fertilizers, pesticides, and herbicides), infrastructure development, and mining, among other activities. Several different processes lead to soil degradation. Physical processes, such as erosion, sealing, and crusting, lead to the structural breakdown of the soil. This means water cannot penetrate the soil surface, causing surface runoff. Chemical processes, such as salinization, acidification, and toxication, lead to chemical imbalances in the soil. Salinization in particular is detrimental, as it makes land less productive for agriculture and affects at least 20% of all irrigated lands. Deliberate disruption of soil in the form of tillage can also alter biological processes in the soil, which leads to excessive mineralization and the loss of nutrients.

Desertification is a type of land degradation in drylands in which fertile areas become increasingly arid as a result of natural processes or human activities, resulting in loss of biological productivity. This spread of arid areas can be influenced by a variety of human factors, such as deforestation, improper land management, overgrazing, anthropogenic climate change, and overexploitation of soil. Throughout geological history, desertification has occurred naturally, though in recent times it is greatly accelerated by human activity.

=== Pollution ===
Ground pollution is soil contamination via pollutants, such as hazardous waste or litter. Ground pollution can be prevented by properly monitoring and disposing of waste, along with reducing unnecessary chemical and plastic use. Unfortunately, proper disposal of waste often is not economically beneficial or technologically viable, leading to short-term solutions of waste disposal that pollute the earth. Examples include dumping harmful industrial byproducts, overusing agricultural fertilizers and other chemicals, and poorly maintaining landfills. Some landfills can be thousands of acres in size, such as the Apex Regional landfill in Las Vegas.

Water pollution on land is the contamination of non-oceanic hydrological surface and underground water features such as lakes, ponds, rivers, streams, wetlands, aquifers, reservoirs, and groundwater as a result of human activities. It may be caused by toxic substances (e.g., oil, metals, plastics, pesticides, persistent organic pollutants, industrial waste products), stressful conditions (e.g., changes of pH, hypoxia or anoxia, increased temperatures, excessive turbidity, unpleasant taste or odor, and changes of salinity), or pathogenic organisms.

=== Biodiversity loss ===
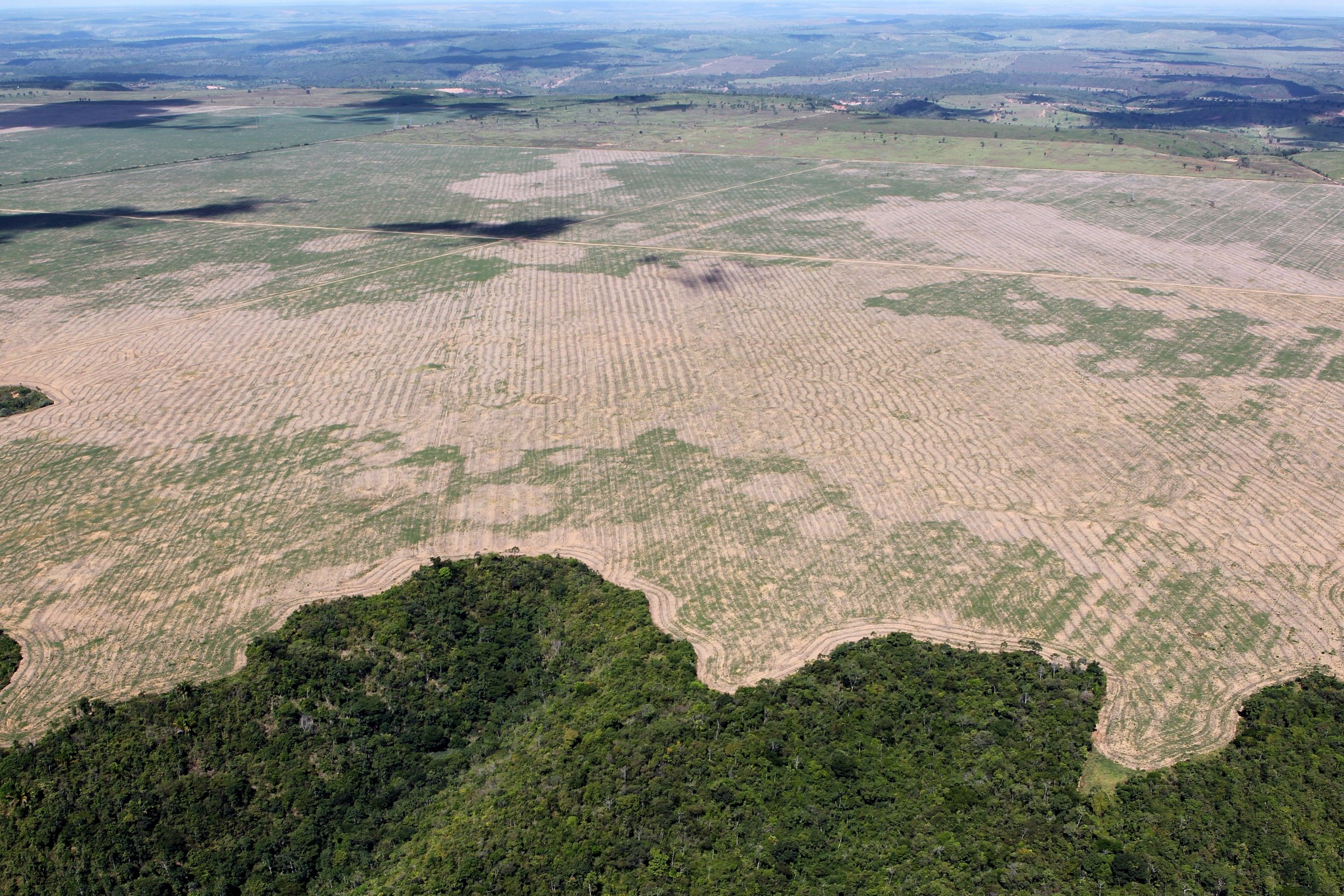
Deforestation in the Amazon rainforest. Human activity can destroy previously diverse ecosystems.

The biodiversity of Earth—the variety and variability of life—is threatened by climate change, human activities, and invasive species. Due to an increase in the rate of extinction, biodiversity loss is increasing. Agriculture can cause biodiversity loss as land is converted for agricultural use at a very high rate, particularly in the tropics, which directly causes habitat loss. The use of pesticides and herbicides can also negatively impact the health of local species. Ecosystems can also be divided and degraded by infrastructure development outside of urban areas.

Biodiversity loss can sometimes be reversed through ecological restoration or ecological resilience, such as through the restoration of abandoned agricultural areas; however, it may also be permanent (e.g., through land loss). The planet's ecosystem is quite sensitive: occasionally, minor changes from a healthy equilibrium can have dramatic influence on a food web or food chain, up to and including the coextinction of that entire food chain. Biodiversity loss leads to reduced ecosystem services, and it can eventually threaten food security. Earth is currently undergoing its sixth mass extinction (the Holocene extinction) as a result of human activities which push beyond the planetary boundaries. So far, this extinction has proven irreversible.

=== Resource depletion ===
Although humans have used land for its natural resources since ancient times, demand for resources such as timber, minerals, and energy has grown exponentially since the Industrial Revolution due to population growth. When a natural resource is depleted to the point of diminishing returns, it is considered the overexploitation of that resource. Some natural resources – such as timber – are considered renewable because, with sustainable practices, they replenish to their previous levels. Fossil fuels such as coal are not considered renewable, as they take millions of years to form, with the current supply of coal expected to peak in the middle of the 21st century. Economic materialism, or consumerism, has influenced destructive patterns of modern resource usage, in contrast with pre-industrial usage.

== Gallery ==
Different varieties of landscapes:

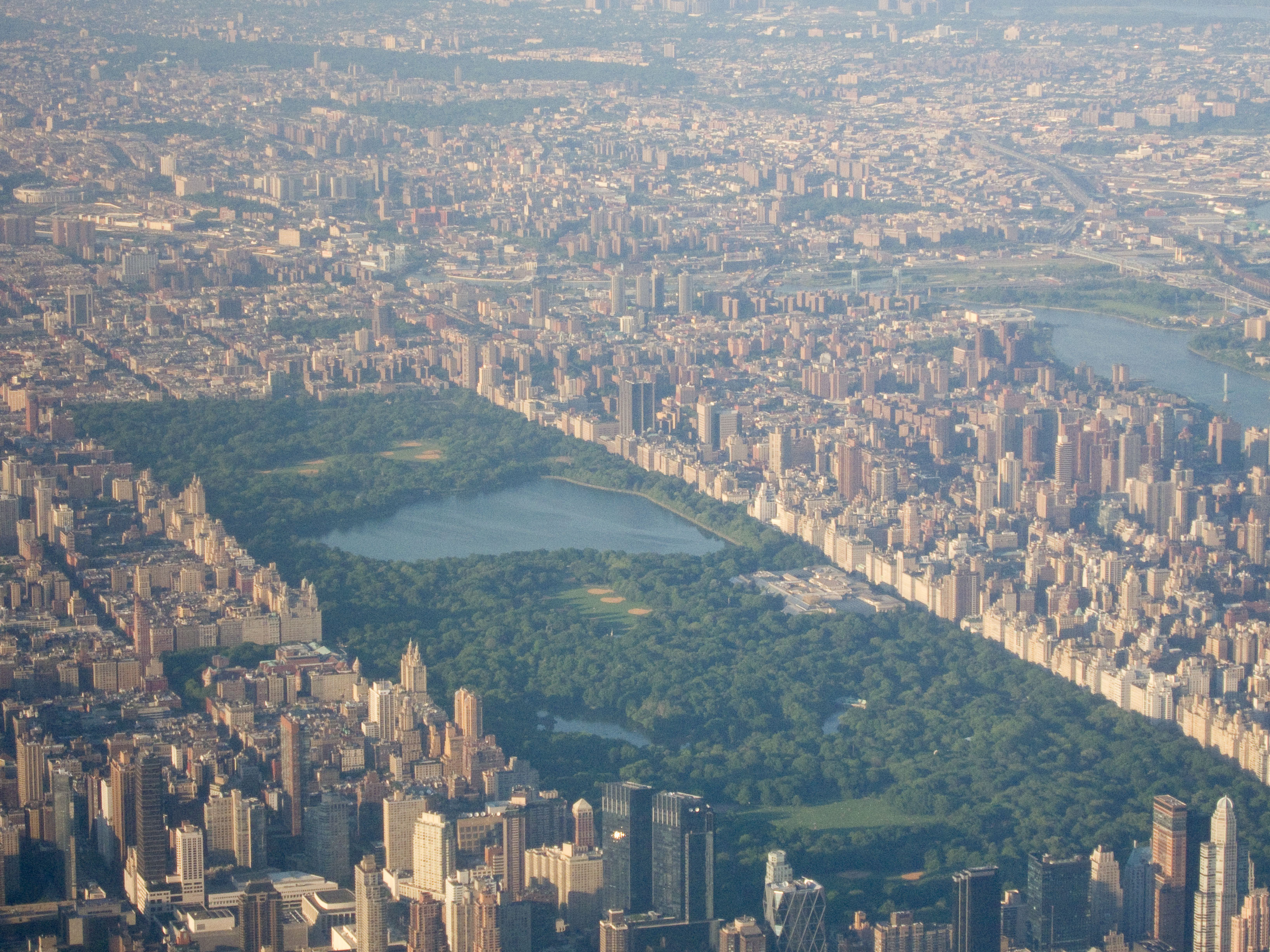
Central Park, New York City

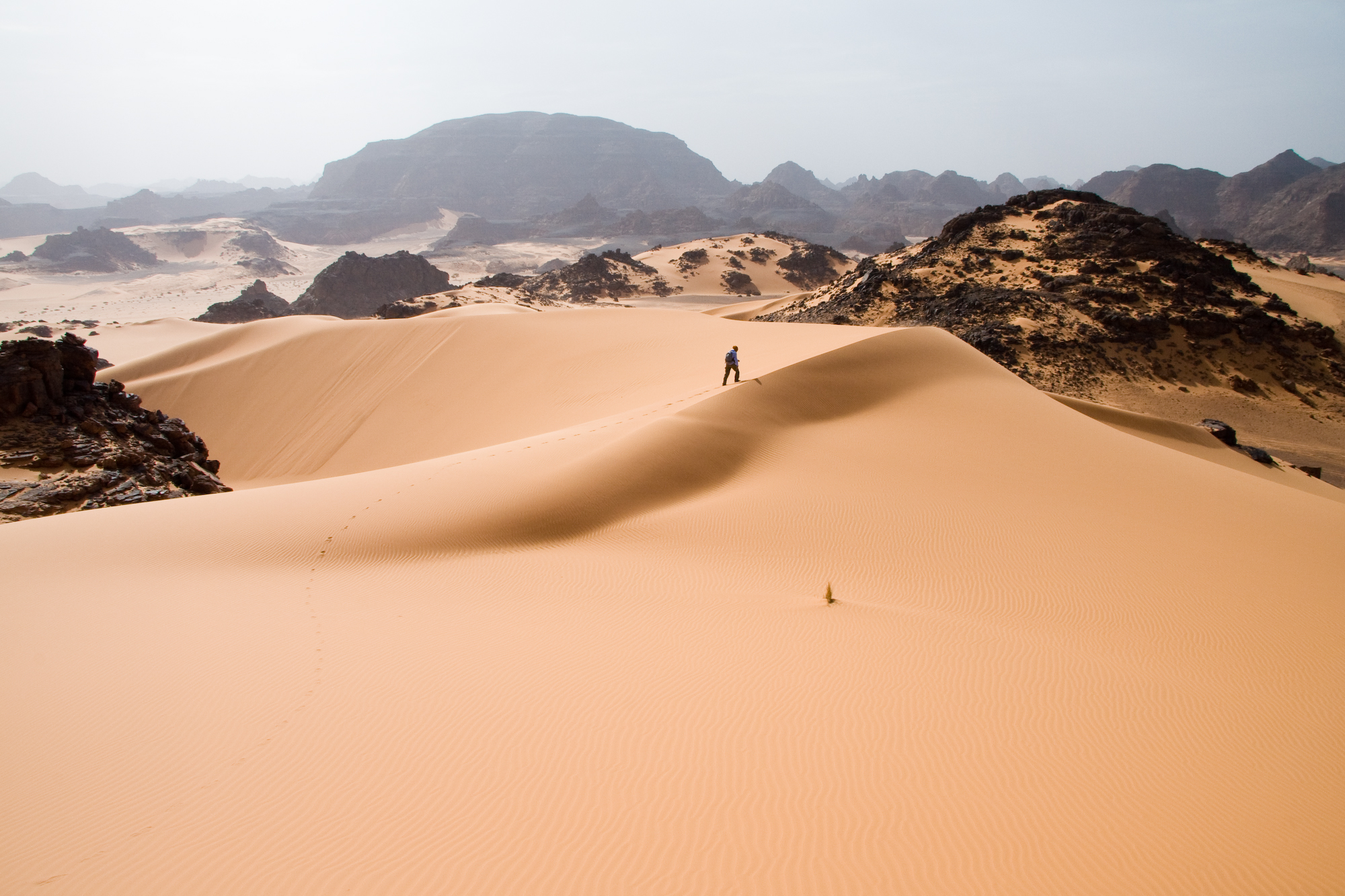
Sahara Desert, Libya

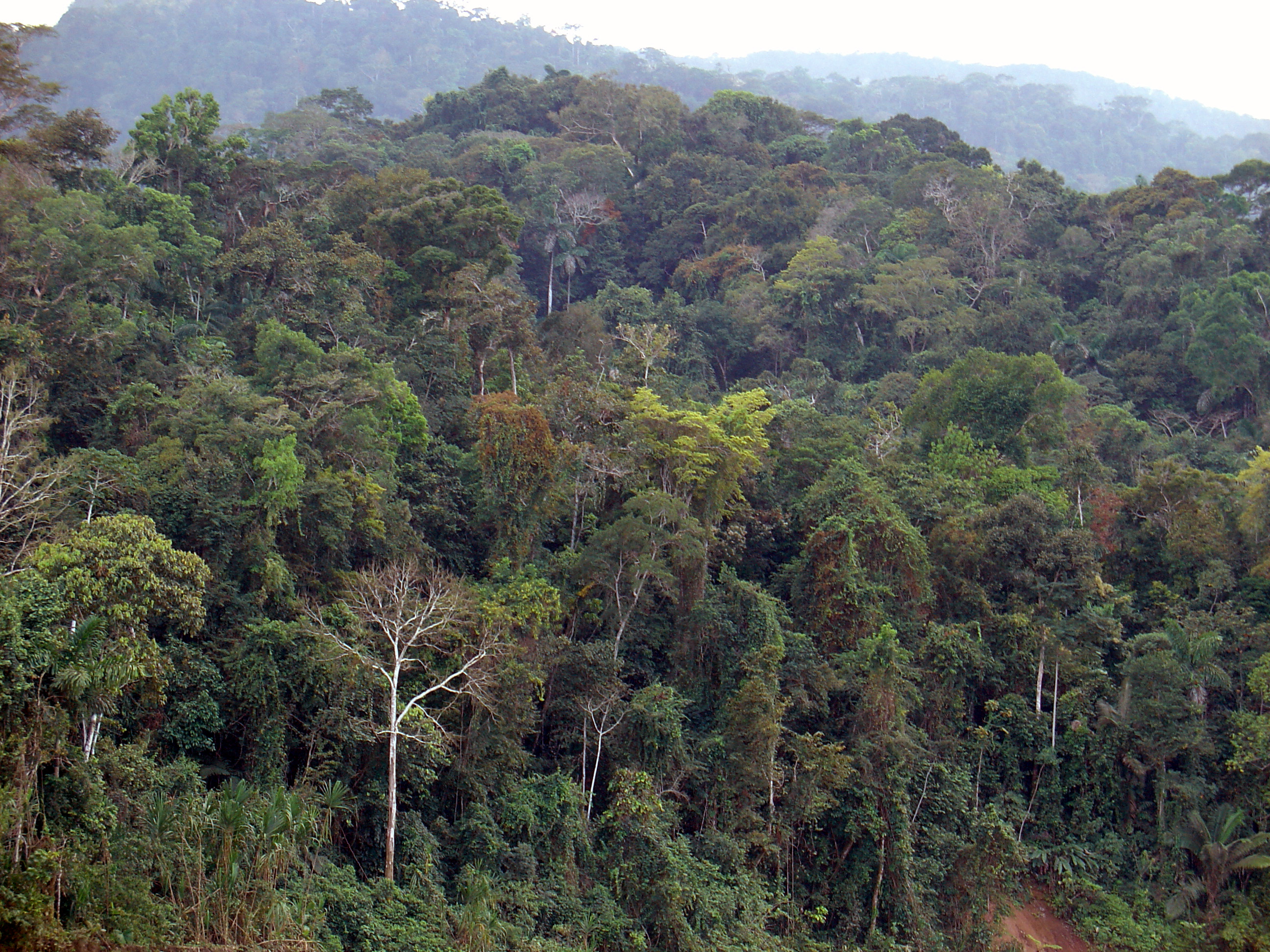
Amazon rainforest, Peru

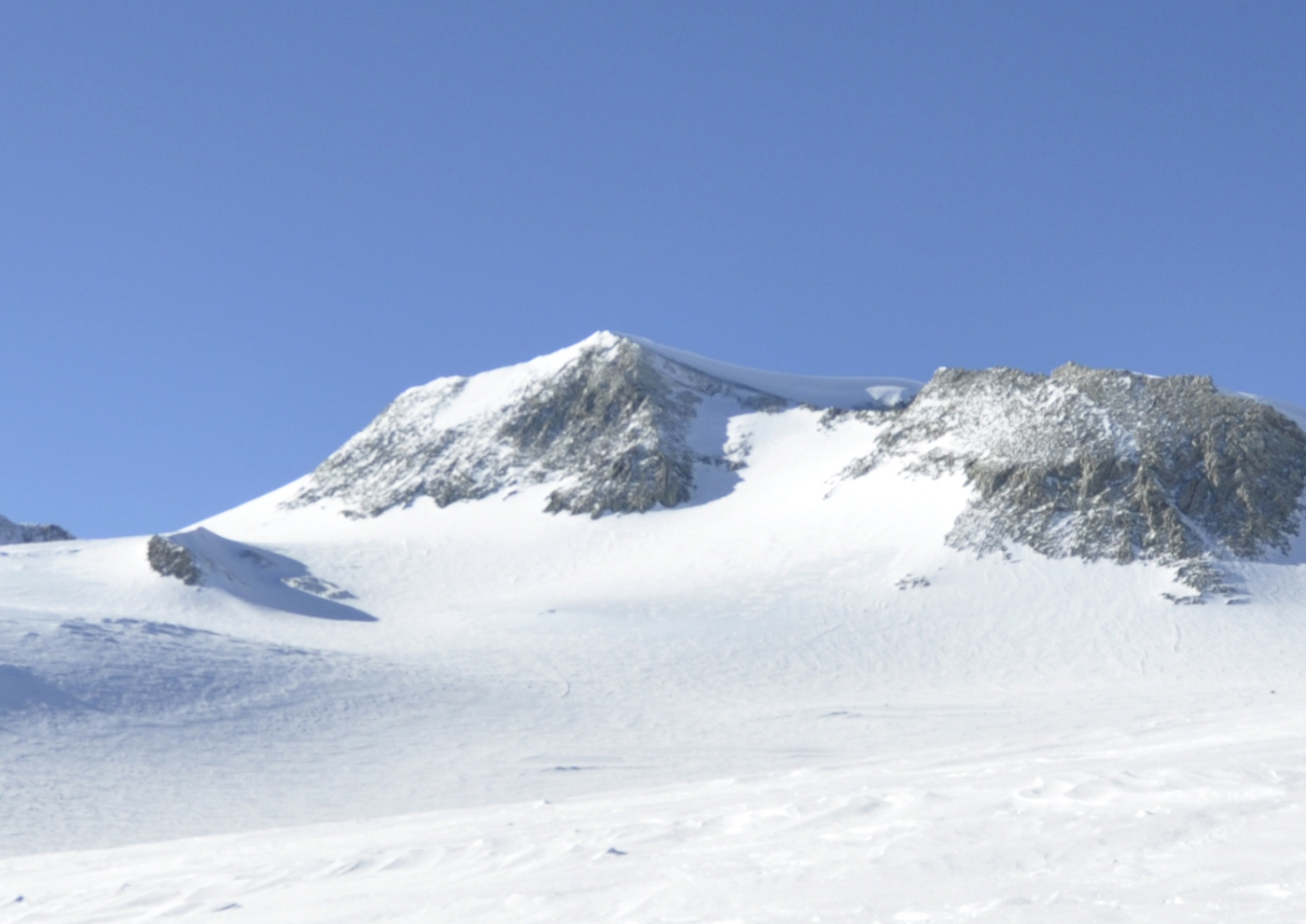
Permafrost, Antarctica

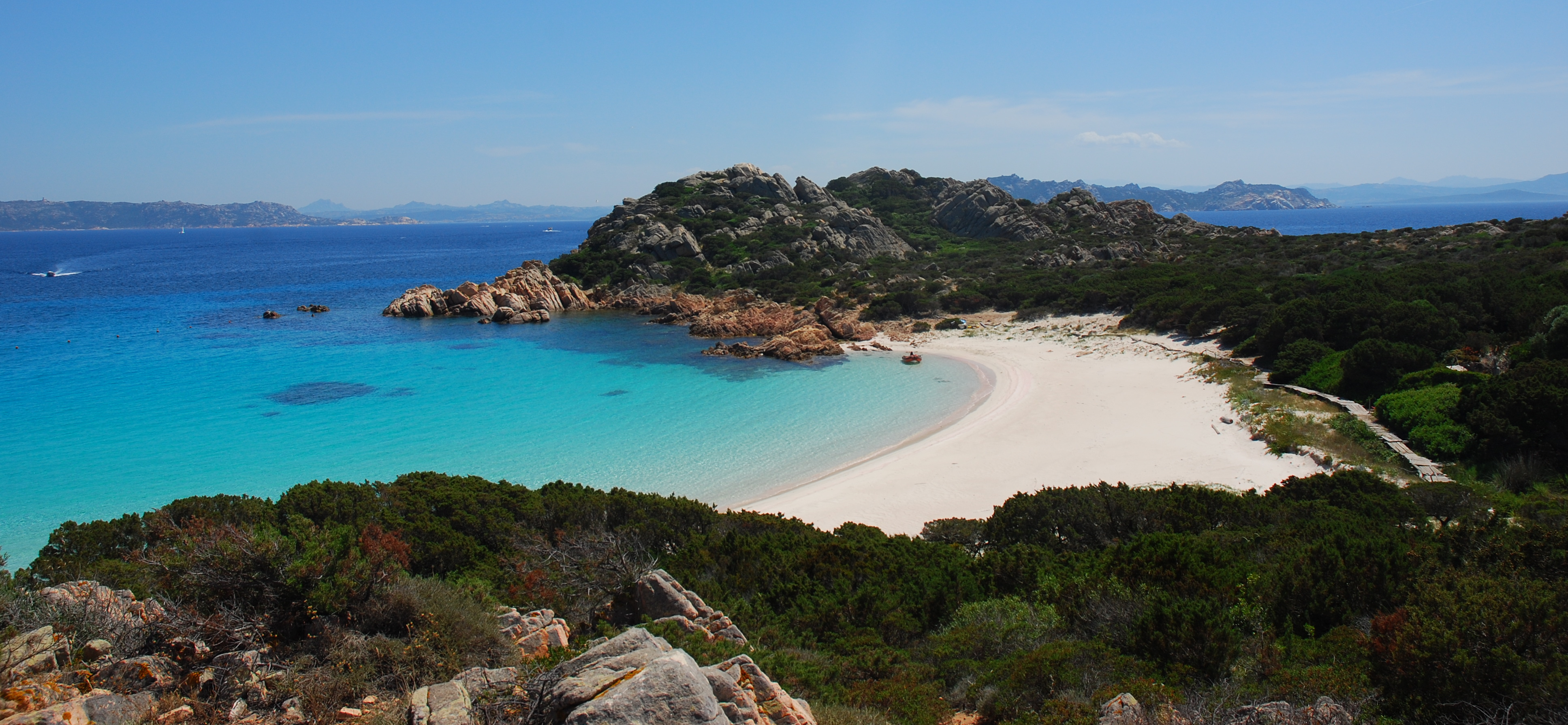
Seaside in Budelli, Italy

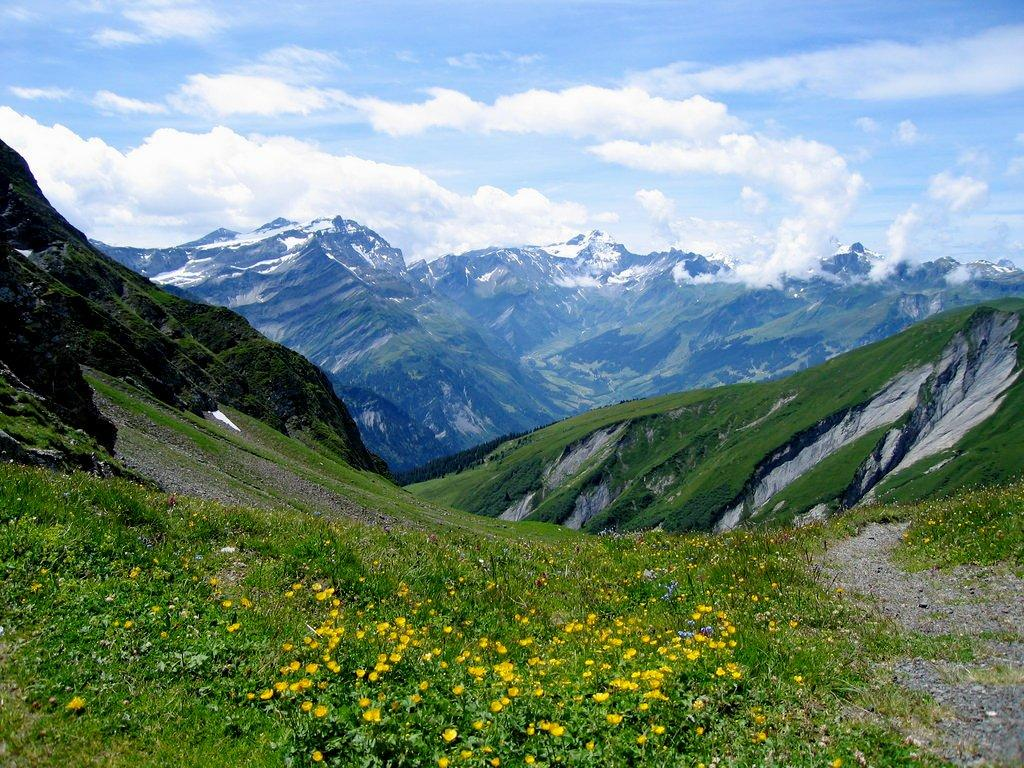
Meadow in the Swiss Alps

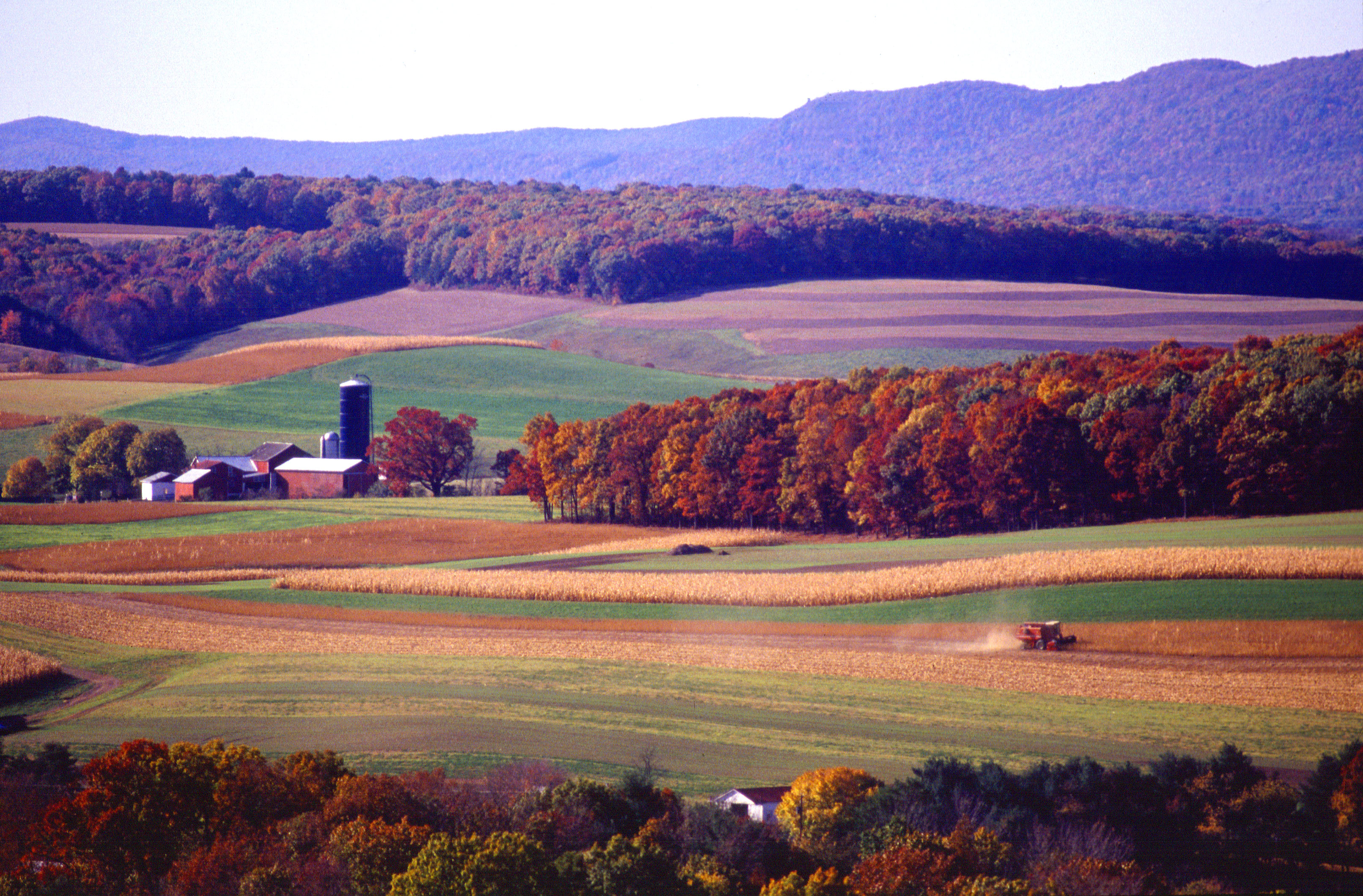
Farmland in Pennsylvania

== See also ==
- Public land
- Solid earth

== Sources ==
This article incorporates text from a free content work. Licensed under CC BY 4.0 (license statement/permission). Text taken from The State of Food and Agriculture 2025, Food and Agriculture Organization of the United Nations.
