= Salic =

Salic may refer to:

- Salian Franks, one of the division of the Franks
- Salic law, a Frankish law code
- Salian dynasty, medieval German dynasty of Frankish descent
- Sial, a class of igneous rock
