= Steilhang =

Terrain at a slope of 30° or more

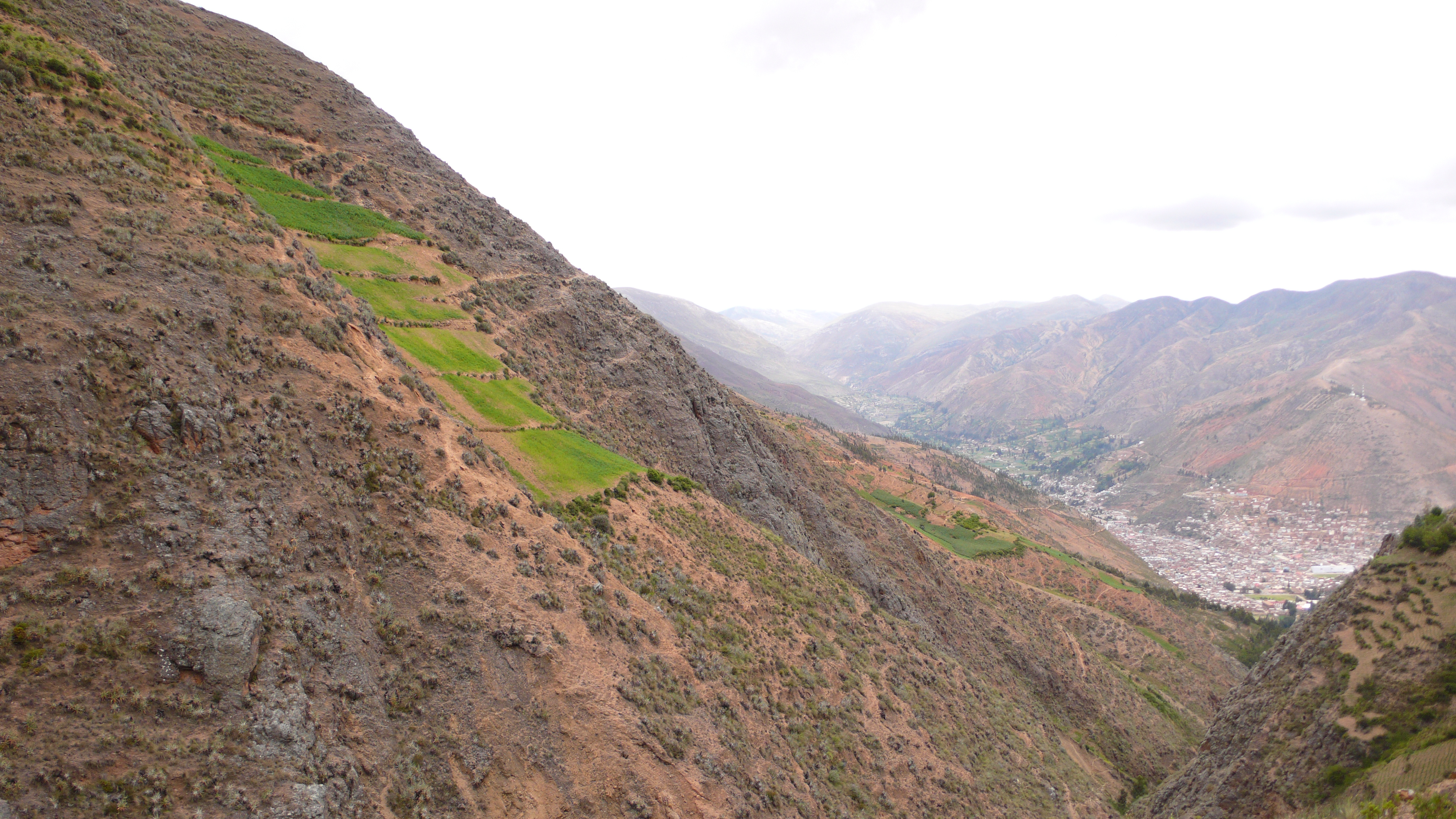
A steilhang

A Steilhang (German: [ˈʃtaɪlhaŋ]; pl. Steilhänge [ˈʃtaɪlhɛŋə]) is a geoscientific term for a steep mountainside or hillside (or a part thereof), the average slope of which is greater than 1:2 or 30°. Leser defines a steilhang as a mountainside with an incline of between 16° and 60°, slopes of between 30° and 60° being described as "very steep" (übersteil) and anything over 60° being a rock face (wand).

The term is German for "steep slope/mountainside/hillside", "escarpment" or "steep face". The word hang in this compound is derived from hängen, "to hang". Also compare the British English word hanger (from Old English hangra) for a steep wooded slope (compare Hanger Lane), or used to mean woods on steep hillsides, e.g. for the East Hampshire Hangers.

== Geology ==
The formation of slopes of different gradients depends on the one hand on the type of underlying rock of the mountain or hill - and this may result in slopes varying from those on the other side of a mountain, hill or valley – and on the other hand on its local hardness, and circumstances of its deposition (sedimentation, stratigraphy, bedding or jointing), on its resistance to erosion and not least on the water flow and local climatic conditions.

From a geomorphological standpoint, there is a distinction made between steilhänge not simply on the basis of their gradient and rock type, but especially on their aspect (i.e. their orientation), their rotundity or roughness (small shapes, flexion, steps, terraces, drainage etc.), the vegetation on the mountainsides or hillsides and the soil formation.

For example, the soil type known as ranker gets its name from the word Ranker which is commonly used in Western Austria to mean steilhang.

== Natural dangers ==
Steilhänge present various natural dangers if they are not forested or interrupted by gentler slopes:

- Landslides – especially if the soil is saturated after long periods of rain or during snowmelt
- Collapse – if there is a rock face or heavily eroded crags above, or
- Rockfall, a less severe occurrence
- Destruction caused by mudflows during bad weather or avalanches
- episodic or sudden rock creep, that may threaten to impound water.

== Farming ==
Steilhänge of up to about 40° can in principle be used for farming – for example to make hay or in forestry to obtain wood. Under favourable climatic conditions they can even be used for viticulture. But they are only rarely economic when compared with more level landscapes with which they are in competition. As a result, hill farmers (their definition varies according to the location of the uplands and their hillsides) are usually supported from the public purse.

This support of the alpine forestry and agriculture is sometimes not only justified, but also essential. Traditionally the higher level authorities are responsible (especially the German states for example), because the individual municipalities are economically unable to. Geotechnological institutions from the fields of mining, avalanche protection and tourism, as well as the EU are active in supporting the affected highlands in Europe

Through sensible support, hill farmers are encouraged or enabled to continue to work their farms or alms. Where this does not happen, the damage caused by the aforementioned natural dangers is generally more costly over time than the costs of subsidising hill farming. The advantages of protective and support measures are:

- Preservation of protected forests (especially against mudflows and avalanches)
- General conservation ("hill farmers as landscape gardeners")
- Environmental protection (e.g. preservation of soil quality, biodiversity, etc...)
- Tourism (desire for "intact landscapes", native customs, etc.)
- Control of mountain streams and avalanches
- Protection of roads and stabilization of forest tracks
- Increased self-sufficiency in terms of the local supply of food and raw materials
- Regional aspects of planning.
