= Conrad discontinuity =

Discontinuous seismic boundary

The Conrad discontinuity corresponds to the sub-horizontal boundary in the continental crust at which the seismic wave velocity increases in a discontinuous way. This boundary is observed in various continental regions at a depth of 15 to 20 km, but it is not found in oceanic regions.

The Conrad discontinuity (named after the seismologist Victor Conrad) is considered to be the border between the upper continental (sial, for silica-aluminium) crust and the lower one (sima, for silica-magnesium). It is not as pronounced as the Mohorovičić discontinuity and absent in some continental regions. Up to the middle 20th century, the upper crust in continental regions was seen to consist of felsic rocks such as granite (sial), and the lower one to consist of more magnesium-rich mafic rocks like basalt (sima). Therefore, the seismologists of that time considered that the Conrad discontinuity should correspond to a sharply defined contact between the chemically distinct two layers, sial and sima. Despite the fact that sial and sima are two solid layers, the lighter sial is thought to "float" on top of the denser sima layer. This forms the basis of Alfred Wegener's 'Continental Drift Theory.' The area of contact during the movement of the Continental plates is on the Conrad discontinuity.

However, from the 1960s onward, this theory was strongly contested among geologists. The exact geological significance of the Conrad discontinuity is still not clarified. The possibility that it represents the transition from amphibolite facies to granulite facies metamorphism has been given some support from observations of the uplifted central part of the Vredefort impact structure and the surrounding Kaapvaal craton.
