= Continental crust =

Layer of rock that forms the continents and continental shelves

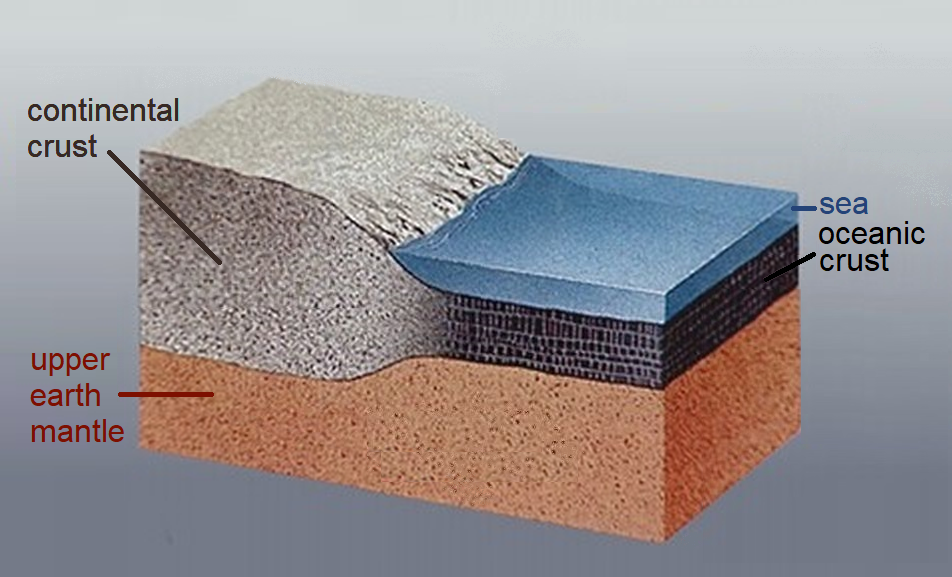
Continental and oceanic crust on the upper mantle

Continental crust is the layer of igneous, metamorphic, and sedimentary rocks that forms the geological continents and the areas of shallow seabed close to their shores, known as continental shelves. This layer is sometimes called sial because its bulk composition is richer in aluminium silicates (Al-Si) and has a lower density compared to the oceanic crust, called sima which is richer in magnesium silicate (Mg-Si) minerals. Changes in seismic wave velocities have shown that at a certain depth (the Conrad discontinuity), there is a reasonably sharp contrast between the more felsic upper continental crust and the lower continental crust, which is more mafic in character.

Most continental crust is dry land above sea level. However, 94% of the Zealandia continental crust region is submerged beneath the Pacific Ocean, with New Zealand constituting 93% of the above-water portion.

== Thickness and density ==
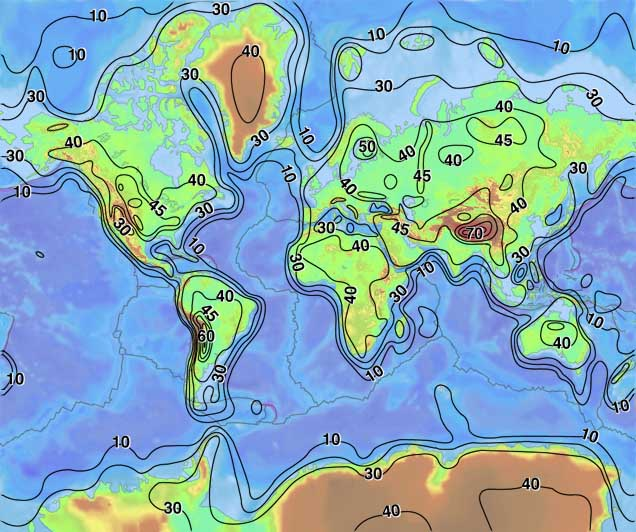
The thickness of Earth's crust (km)

The continental crust consists of various layers, with a bulk composition that is intermediate (SiO_{2} wt% = 60.6). The average density of the continental crust is about 2.83 g/cm^{3} (0.102 lb/cu in), less dense than the ultramafic material that makes up the mantle, which has a density of around 3.3 g/cm^{3} (0.12 lb/cu in). Continental crust is also less dense than oceanic crust, whose density is about 2.9 g/cm^{3} (0.10 lb/cu in). At 25 to 70 km (16 to 43 mi) in thickness, continental crust is considerably thicker than oceanic crust, which has an average thickness of around 7 to 10 km (4.3 to 6.2 mi). Approximately 41% of Earth's surface area and about 70% of the volume of Earth's crust are continental crust.

== Importance ==
Because the surface of continental crust mainly lies above sea level, its existence allowed land life to evolve from marine life. Its existence also provides broad expanses of shallow water known as epeiric seas and continental shelves where complex metazoan life could become established during early Paleozoic time, in what is now called the Cambrian explosion.

== Origin ==
All continental crust is ultimately derived from mantle-derived melts (mainly basalt) through fractional differentiation of basaltic melt and the assimilation (remelting) of pre-existing continental crust. The relative contributions of these two processes in creating continental crust are debated, but fractional differentiation is thought to play the dominant role. These processes occur primarily at magmatic arcs associated with subduction.

There is little evidence of continental crust prior to 3.5 Ga. About 20% of the continental crust's current volume was formed by 3.0 Ga. There was relatively rapid development on shield areas consisting of continental crust between 3.0 and 2.5 Ga. During this time interval, about 60% of the continental crust's current volume was formed. The remaining 20% has formed during the last 2.5 Ga.

Proponents of a steady-state hypothesis argue that the total volume of continental crust has remained more or less the same after early rapid planetary differentiation of Earth and that presently found age distribution is just the result of the processes leading to the formation of cratons (the parts of the crust clustered in cratons being less likely to be reworked by plate tectonics). However, this is not generally accepted.

== Forces at work ==
In contrast to the persistence of continental crust, the size, shape, and number of continents are constantly changing through geologic time. Different tracts rift apart, collide and recoalesce as part of a grand supercontinent cycle.

There are currently about 7 billion cubic kilometres (1.7 billion cubic miles) of continental crust, but this quantity varies because of the nature of the forces involved. The relative permanence of continental crust contrasts with the short life of oceanic crust. Because continental crust is less dense than oceanic crust, when active margins of the two meet in subduction zones, the oceanic crust is typically subducted back into the mantle. Continental crust is rarely subducted (this may occur where continental crustal blocks collide and overthicken, causing deep melting under mountain belts such as the Himalayas or the Alps). For this reason the oldest rocks on Earth are within the cratons or cores of the continents, rather than in repeatedly recycled oceanic crust; the oldest intact crustal fragment is the Acasta Gneiss at 4.01 Ga, whereas the oldest large-scale oceanic crust (located on the Pacific plate offshore of the Kamchatka Peninsula) is from the Jurassic (≈180 Ma), although there might be small older remnants in the Mediterranean Sea at about 340 Ma. Continental crust and the rock layers that lie on and within it are thus the best archive of Earth's history.

The height of mountain ranges is usually related to the thickness of crust. This results from the isostasy associated with orogeny (mountain formation). The crust is thickened by the compressive forces related to subduction or continental collision. The buoyancy of the crust forces it upwards, the forces of the collisional stress balanced by gravity and erosion. This forms a keel or mountain root beneath the mountain range, which is where the thickest crust is found. The thinnest continental crust is found in rift zones, where the crust is thinned by detachment faulting and eventually severed, replaced by oceanic crust. The edges of continental fragments formed this way (both sides of the Atlantic Ocean, for example) are termed passive margins.

The high temperatures and pressures at depth, often combined with a long history of complex distortion, cause much of the lower continental crust to be metamorphic – the main exception to this being recent igneous intrusions. Igneous rock may also be "underplated" to the underside of the crust, i.e. adding to the crust by forming a layer immediately beneath it.

Continental crust is produced and (far less often) destroyed mostly by plate tectonic processes, especially at convergent plate boundaries. Additionally, continental crustal material is transferred to oceanic crust by sedimentation. New material can be added to the continents by the partial melting of oceanic crust at subduction zones, causing the lighter material to rise as magma, forming volcanoes. Also, material can be accreted horizontally when volcanic island arcs, seamounts or similar structures collide with the side of the continent as a result of plate tectonic movements. Continental crust is also lost through erosion and sediment subduction, tectonic erosion of forearcs, delamination, and deep subduction of continental crust in collision zones. Many theories of crustal growth are controversial, including rates of crustal growth and recycling, whether the lower crust is recycled differently from the upper crust, and over how much of Earth history plate tectonics has operated and so could be the dominant mode of continental crust formation and destruction.

It is a matter of debate whether the amount of continental crust has been increasing, decreasing, or remaining constant over geological time. One model indicates that at prior to 3.7 Ga ago continental crust constituted less than 10% of the present amount. By 3.0 Ga ago the amount was about 25%, and following a period of rapid crustal evolution it was about 60% of the current amount by 2.6 Ga ago. The growth of continental crust appears to have occurred in spurts of increased activity corresponding to five episodes of increased production through geologic time.

== See also ==
- Digital geological mapping
- Geological map
- Geologic province
- Lithosphere
- Mohorovičić discontinuity
- Oceanic crust
- OneGeology
- Plate tectonics
- Terrane
