= Sial =

Rocks rich in aluminium silicate minerals

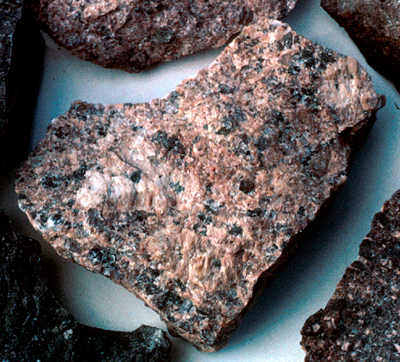
Typical sial material, a Precambrian granite from St. Francois Mountains, Missouri, showing the potassium feldspar (felsic) matrix

In geology, sial is an antiquated blended term for the composition of the upper layer of Earth's crust, namely rocks rich in aluminium silicate minerals. It is sometimes equated with the continental crust because it is absent in the wide oceanic basins, but 'sial' is a geochemical term rather than a plate tectonic term. As these elements are less dense than the majority of Earth's elements, they tend to be concentrated in the upper layer of the crust.

The uppermost layer of the crust is called the sial, consisting of silicate and aluminium (Si = silicate, Al = aluminium). On average, the thickness of the sial is till 25 km from the surface. The continents are composed mainly of lighter rock material formed from silicon and aluminium, so the sial is thick over the continents and very thin or absent on the ocean floor, especially the Pacific Ocean. Average density of the sial is 2.7 g/cm^{3}.

Geologists often refer to the rocks in this layer as felsic, because they contain high levels of feldspar, an aluminium silicate mineral series. However, the sial "actually has quite a diversity of rock types, including large amounts of basaltic rocks."

The name 'sial' was taken from the first two letters of silica and of alumina. The sial is often contrasted to the 'sima' (another antiquated blended term), the next lower layer in Earth, which is rich in silica and magnesium and is often exposed in the ocean basins; and the nickel-iron alloy core, sometimes referred to as the 'Nife'. These geochemical divisions of Earth's interior (with these names) were first proposed by Eduard Suess in the 19th century. This model of the outer layers of Earth has been confirmed by petrographic, gravimetric, and seismic evidence.

== Properties ==
The sial has a lower density (2700–2800 kg/m^{3}) than the sima, which is primarily due to increased amounts of aluminium, and decreased amounts of iron and magnesium. The base of the sial is not a strict boundary, the sial grades into the denser rocks of the sima. The Conrad discontinuity has been proposed as the boundary, but little is known about it, and it doesn't seem to match the point of geochemical change. Instead, the boundary has been arbitrarily set at a mean density of 2800 kg/m^{3}.

Because of the large pressures, over geologic time, the sima flows like a very viscous liquid, so, in a real sense, the sial floats on the sima, in isostatic equilibrium. Mountains extend down as well as up, much like icebergs on the ocean; so that on the continental plates, the sial runs between 5 km and 70 km deep.

== See also ==
- Asthenosphere
- Eduard Suess
- KREEP
- Lithosphere
- Earth's mantle

== Sources ==
- Bates, R.L., and Jackson, J.A., (1987) Glossary of geology American Geological Institute, Alexandria, Virginia.
- Dilek, Y. and Newcomb, S. (eds.) (2003) Ophiolite Concept and the Evolution of Geological Thought Geological Society of America Special Paper 373, Boulder, Colorado.
