= Ranker (soil) =

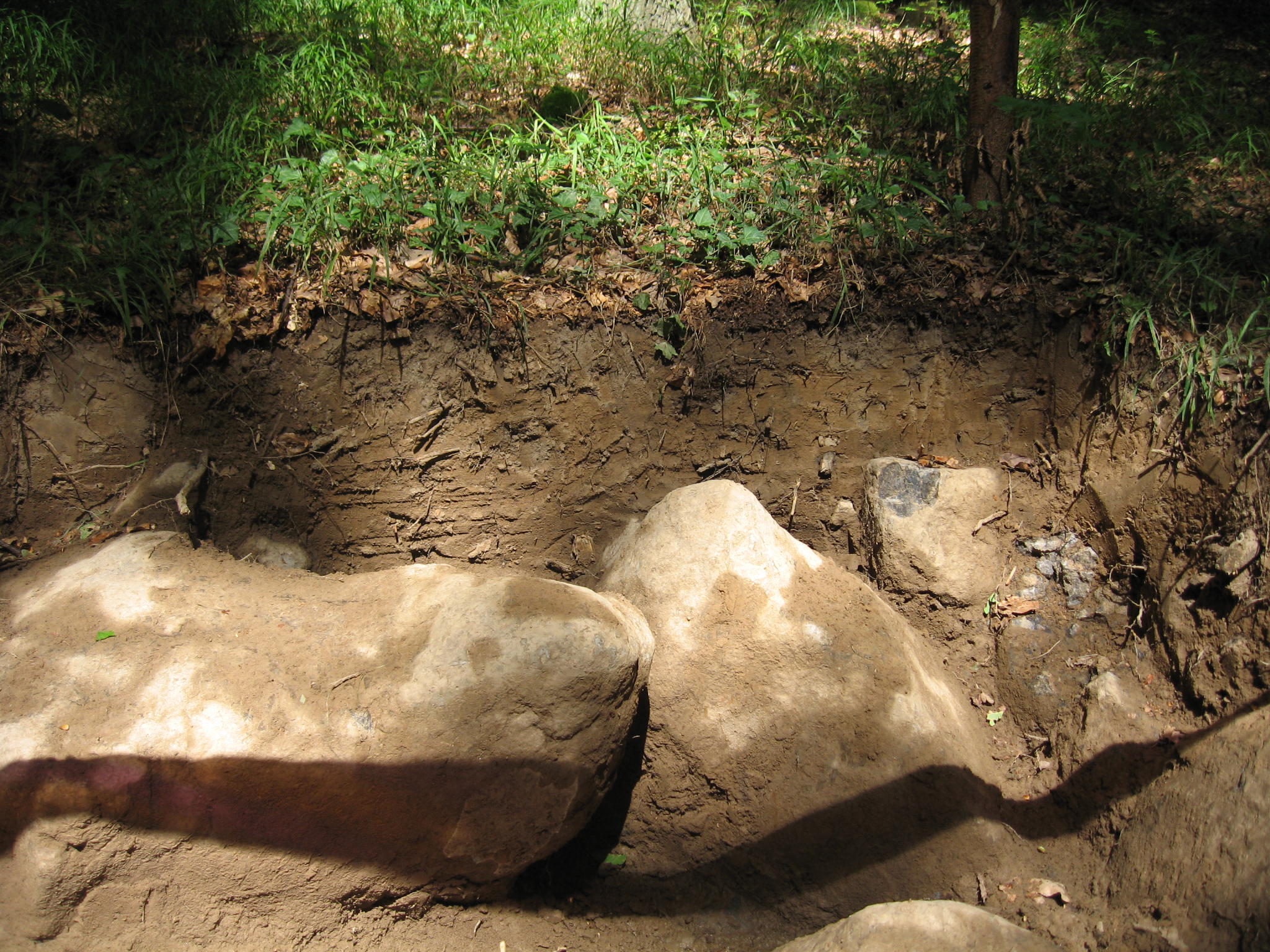
Example of ranker

Ranker is soil developed over non-calcareous material, usually rock. It is regarded in some soil classifications as lithomorphic, a group which also includes rendzina, similar soil over calcareous material. It is often called A/C soil, as the topsoil, or A horizon, is immediately over a C horizon (unaltered parent material).
