= Sima (geology) =

Rocks rich in magnesium silicate minerals

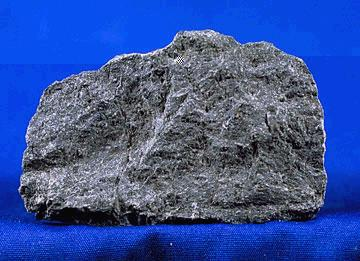
Sima often takes the form of basalt when on the surface

In geology, sima (/ˈsaɪmə/) is an antiquated blended term for the lower layer of Earth's crust. This layer is made of rocks rich in magnesium silicate minerals. Typically, when the sima comes to the surface, it is basalt, so sometimes this layer is called the 'ocean layer' of the crust. The sima layer is also called the 'basal crust' or 'basal layer' because it is the lowest layer of the crust. Because the ocean floors are mainly sima, it is also sometimes called the 'oceanic crust'.

The name 'sima' was taken from the first two letters of silica and of magnesia.

Comparable is the term sial (another antiquated blended term), which is the name for the upper layer of Earth's crust (continental crust), namely rocks rich in aluminium silicate minerals.

== Petrology ==
The sima has a higher density (2800 to 3300 kg/m^{3}) than the sial, which is due to larger amounts of iron and magnesium, and smaller amounts of aluminium. When the denser sima comes to the surface it forms mafic rocks, or rocks with mafic minerals. The most dense sima has less silica and forms ultramafic rocks.

== See also ==
- Asthenosphere
- Eduard Suess
- KREEP
- Lithosphere
- Earth's mantle
