= Annie Souriau =

French seismologist

Annie Souriau Thevenard
- Born: 1947 (age 78–79); Saint-Cloud, near Paris, France
- Education: Ecole normale supérieure (physics). Institut de Physique du Globe, Paris (Ph.D 1971 - 1978).
- Awards: Fellow, American Geophysical Union (2001) Member, Academia Europaea (2004) Beno Gutenberg Medal, European Geosciences Union (2019) Inaugural winner of the Réseau Accélérométrique Permanent award (2018) Prize Binoux of the French Academy of Sciences (1989) Corresponding member of the Bureau des longitudes, Paris (2010)
- Scientific career
- Fields: Seismology, Geology
- Workplaces: CNRS (Centre National de la Recherche Scientifique) from 1971. Institut de Physique du Globe, Paris (1971-1978). Groupe de Recherche de Géodésie Spatiale, Toulouse, from 1979, then Laboratoire « Dynamique Terrestre et Planétaire », Toulouse, then Institut de Recherche en Planétologie en Astrophysique, Toulouse (until 2019) Harvard University (1983-1984) Australian National University, Canberra (1988)
- Thesis: Le manteau supérieur sous la France et les régions limitrophes au nord (1978)

Annie Souriau is a French seismologist. She is primarily known for her research into the Earth's deep interior, in particular the Earth's core. With her colleagues, she has made notable advances in the understanding of the structure of the liquid Earth's outer core and solid inner core, in relation with Earth evolution. She has also made important contributions to the analysis of the seismic activity and structure of the Pyrenean range, and on seismic risk in the area.

== Education and career ==
Annie Souriau received most of her education in Dijon (Burgundy, France) before being admitted to the Ecole normale supérieure de Fontenay-aux-Roses, where she learned physics and passed the agregation (higher level teacher certification) in 1971. She then obtained a position at CNRS (Centre national de la Recherche Scientifique) and joined the Institut de Physique du Globe in Paris where she obtained her Ph.D. in 1978 in seismology on the structure of the upper mantle. She moved to Toulouse in 1979 in a Space Geodesy Research Group, where a new CNRS structure was created to link fundamental research and space experiments conducted by the CNES (Centre National d’Etudes Spatiales) in Earth sciences. A specific group in Terrestrial and Planetary Dynamics was then created. She spent 1983 to 1984 at Harvard University, and a six-month period at ANU (Australian National University) in Canberra. Then she joined the newly created Observatoire Midi-Pyrénées, as head of a small research group in global Earth seismology, which was also in charge of the seismic survey of the Pyrenean range. Annie Souriau was the recipient of the 2019 EGU Gutenberg Medal.

== Research ==
Annie Souriau is mostly known for her contributions to the study of the structure of the liquid Earth's outer core and solid inner core and their boundaries, which are key elements to understand the evolution of the Earth through geological time, in particular its cooling and differentiation. From the fine analysis of seismic waves which traverse the core or are reflected or diffracted at core boundaries, she revealed some important features in the core. She identified a dense layer at the base of the liquid outer core. She also showed that the seismic waves in the inner core have an anisotropic attenuation, after having contributed to the discovery of their anisotropy in velocity. This implies specific characteristics for the fine internal structure of the inner core. With colleagues, she contributed to demonstrate the hemispherical East-West dichotomy of the Earth’s inner core, propose a mechanism at the origin of this dichotomy, and suggest a possible relation with the dense basal layer of the liquid outer core. She also first proposed and discussed the possible detection with analysis of seismic waves of a possibly slightly different rotation rate of the inner core compared with the mantle.

In geodesy, she established a correlation between the deep mantle structure, the geoid and the surface topography, with a degree-two pattern related to the distribution of oceanic ridges and subduction zones. She also examined how earthquakes influence the drift of the Earth's pole and the Chandler wobble, a small periodic but irregular deviation of the Earth rotation axis.

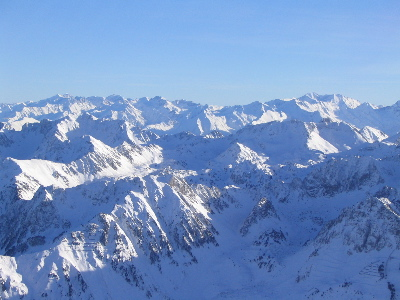
Pyrenees mountains

The study of the Pyrenean seismicity and deep structure has been another important field of research for Annie Souriau. With colleagues from other institutions, the Toulouse team set up networks of seismometers in the mountain range, which contributed to a detailed knowledge of the earthquake activity in the area, and produced the first tomographic map of a whole mountain range. They also contributed to the evaluation of the seismic risk in the city of Lourdes.

=== Selected publications ===
- Souriau, Annie (2004). Les séismes dans les Pyrénées. Portet-sur-Garonne (Haute-Garonne): F. Loubatières. ISBN 2-86266-439-1. OCLC 419406097.
- Dehant, Véronique; Creager, Kenneth C.; Karato, Shun-ichiro; Zatman, Stephen; Souriau, Annie (2003). Earth's core : dynamics, structure, rotation. Washington, D.C.: American Geophysical Union. ISBN 978-1-118-67007-1. OCLC 798834883.
- Souriau, Annie (1998). "Is the Rotation Real?". Science. 281 (5373): 55–56. doi:10.1126/science.281.5373.55. ISSN 0036-8075. JSTOR 2895379. S2CID 127489559.
- Souriau, Annie; Pauchet, Hélène (May 1998). "A new synthesis of Pyrenean seismicity and its tectonic implications". Tectonophysics. 290 (3–4): 221–244. Bibcode:1998Tectp.290..221S. doi:10.1016/S0040-1951(98)00017-1.
- Poupinet, G.; Pillet, R.; Souriau, A. (September 1983). "Possible heterogeneity of the Earth's core deduced from PKIKP travel times". Nature. 305 (5931): 204–206. Bibcode:1983Natur.305..204P. doi:10.1038/305204a0. S2CID 4275432.
- Annie Souriau, J. H. Woodhouse; A strategy for deploying a seismological network for global studies of Earth structure. Bulletin of the Seismological Society of America 1985;; 75 (4): 1179–1193. doi: https://doi.org/10.1785/BSSA0750041179
- Spatial variations of b-value and crustal stress in the Pyrenees, A. Rigo &A. Souriau &M. Sylvander, (October 2017)
- Deep Earth Structure: The Earth's Cores, A. Souriau, Marie Calvet (2015)
- Séismicité de la bordure nord des Pyrénées centrales et occidentales: une conséquence de la subsidence de blocs denses exhumés dans la croûte supérieure, Annie Souriau, Alexis Rigo, Matthieu Sylvander, Sébastien Benahmed, Frank Grimaud (2014)
- Presumption of large-scale heterogeneity at the top of the outer core basal layer, Annie Souriau (2015)
- Seismicity in central-western Pyrenees (France): A consequence of the subsidence of dense exhumed bodies, Annie Souriau, Alexis Rigo, Matthieu Sylvander, Sébastien Benahmed(2014)
- Seismic attenuation in the eastern Australian and Antarctic plates, from multiple ScS waves, Annie Souriau, Luis Rivera, Alessia Maggi, Jean Jacques Lévêque (2012)
- Ground motion simulations of a major historical earthquake (1660) in the French Pyrenees using recent moderate size earthquakes, L. Honore, Françoise Courboulex, Annie Souriau, (2011)
- Multimethod Characterization of the French-Pyrenean Valley of Bagneres-de-Bigorre for Seismic-Hazard Evaluation: Observations and Models, Annie Souriau, Emmanuel Chaljub, Cécile Cornou, Ludovic Margerin, Marie Calvet, Julie Maury, Marc Wathelet, Franck Grimaud, Christian Ponsolles, Catherine Pequegnat, Mickaël Langlais, and Philippe Guéguen, (August 2011), doi: 10.1785/0120100293
- Lopsided growth of Earth's inner core: a new interpretation for seismic hemispherical variations in the uppermost inner core (Invited), Marie Calvet, M.Monnereau, Ludovic Margerin, A. Souriau, (2010)
- Seismological constraints on ice properties at Dome C, Antarctica, from horizontal to vertical spectral ratios, Jean-Jacques Lé, V Que, Alessia Maggi, Annie Souriau (2010) doi:10.1017/S0954102010000325
- CASE-IPY: autonomous seismic stations newly deployed on the East Antarctic Plateau, Jean-Jacques Leveque, Alessia Maggi, Annie Souriau, Gerard Wittlinger (2010)
- Commentary on the note Refutation of the sismo-acoustic hypothesis invoked by the double bang catastrophe in Toulouse (France) on 21 September 2001, Annie Souriau, Alexis Rigo, Matthieu Sylvander, 2009)
- A Major Historical Earthquake in the French Pyrenees Revisited using Actual Moderate Size Earthquakes, Françoise Courboulex, L. Honore, A. Souriau (2010)

== Awards and honors ==
- Fellow, American Geophysical Union (2001)
- Member, Academia Europaea (2004)
- Beno Gutenberg Medal, European Geosciences Union (2019)
- Inaugural winner of the Réseau Accélérométrique Permanent (RAP) award (2018)
- Prize Binoux of the French Academy of Sciences (1989)
- Corresponding member of the Bureau des longitudes, Paris (2010)
