= Primitive mantle =

Layer in a newly formed planet

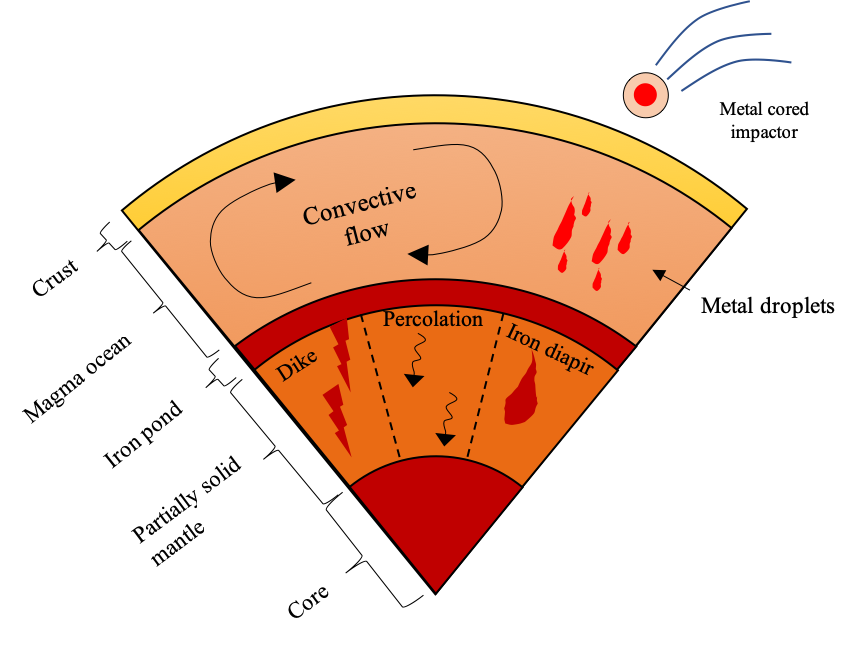
Illustration depicting three proposed processes that drive core–mantle differentiation (dikes, percolation, and iron diapirism), thus separating the core from the primitive mantle.

In geochemistry, the primitive mantle (also known as the bulk silicate Earth) is the chemical composition of the Earth's mantle during the developmental stage between core-mantle differentiation and the formation of early continental crust. The chemical composition of the primitive mantle contains characteristics of both the crust and the mantle.

== Development ==
One accepted scientific hypothesis is that the Earth was formed by accretion of material with a chondritic composition through impacts with differentiated planetesimals. During this accretionary phase, planetary differentiation separated the Earth's core, where heavy metallic siderophile elements accumulated, from the surrounding undifferentiated primitive mantle. Further differentiation would take place later, creating the different chemical reservoirs of crust and mantle material, with incompatible elements accumulating in the crust.

Today, differentiation still continues in the upper mantle, resulting in two types of mantle reservoirs: those depleted in lithophile elements (depleted reservoirs), and those composed of "fresh" undifferentiated mantle material (enriched or primitive reservoirs). Volcanic rocks from hotspot areas often have a primitive composition, and because the magma at hotspots is supposed to have been taken to the surface from the deepest regions of the mantle by mantle plumes, geochemists assume there must be a relatively closed and very undifferentiated primitive reservoir somewhere in the lower mantle. One hypothesis to describe this assumption is the existence of the D"-layer at the core-mantle boundary.

== Chemical composition ==
Although the chemical composition of the primitive mantle cannot be directly measured at its source, researchers have been able to estimate primitive mantle characteristics using a few methods. One methodology involves the analysis of chondritic meteorites that represent early Earth chemical composition and creating models using the analyzed chemical characteristics and assumptions describing inner-Earth dynamics. This approach is based on the assumption that early planetary bodies in the Solar System formed under similar conditions, giving them comparable chemical compositions. The more direct methodology is to observe trends in the chemical makeup of upper mantle peridotites and interpret the hypothetical composition of the primitive mantle based on these trends. This is done by matching the peridotite compositional trends to the distribution of refractory lithophile elements (which are not affected by core-mantle differentiation) in chondritic meteorites. Both methods have limitations based on the assumptions made about inner-earth, as well as statistical uncertainties in the models used to quantify the data.

The two approaches detailed above yield weight percentages that follow the same general trends when compared to the depleted (or homogeneous) mantle: the primitive mantle has significantly higher concentrations of SiO_{2,} Al_{2}O_{3}, Na_{2}O, and CaO, and significantly lower concentrations of MgO. More importantly, both approaches show that the primitive mantle has much greater concentrations of refractory lithophile elements (e.g Al, Ba, Be, Ca, Hf, Nb, Sc, Sr, Ta, Th, Ti, U, Y, Zr, and rare earth elements). The exact concentrations of these compounds and refractory lithophile elements depends on the estimation method used. Methods using peridotite analysis yield a much smaller primitive mantle weight percentage for SiO_{2} and significantly larger primitive mantle weight percentages for MgO and Al_{2}O_{3} than those estimated using direct chondritic meteorite analysis. The estimated concentrations of refractory lithophile elements obtained from the two methods vary as well, usually 0.1-5 ppm.

== See also ==
- Giant impact hypothesis
