= Lithosphere–asthenosphere boundary =

Level representing a mechanical difference between layers in Earth's inner structure

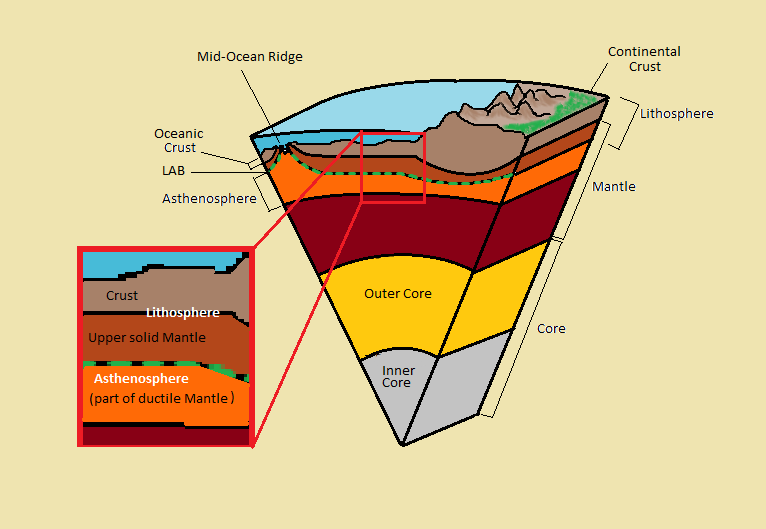
A diagram of the internal structure of Earth. The lithosphere consists of the crust and upper solid mantle (lithospheric mantle). The green dashed line marks the LAB.

The lithosphere–asthenosphere boundary (referred to as the LAB by geophysicists) represents a mechanical difference between layers in Earth's inner structure. Earth's inner structure can be described both chemically (crust, mantle, and core) and mechanically. The lithosphere–asthenosphere boundary lies between Earth's cooler, rigid lithosphere and the warmer, ductile asthenosphere. The actual depth of the boundary is still a topic of debate and study, although it is known to vary according to the environment. The following overview follows the chapters in the research monograph by Irina Artemieva on "The Lithosphere".

== Definition ==
The LAB is determined from the differences in the lithosphere and asthenosphere including, but not limited to, differences in grain size, chemical composition, thermal properties, and extent of partial melt; these are factors that affect the rheological differences in the lithosphere and asthenosphere.

=== Mechanical boundary layer (MBL) ===
The LAB separates the mechanically strong lithosphere from the weak asthenosphere. The depth to the LAB can be estimated from the amount of flexure the lithosphere has undergone due to an applied load at the surface (such as the flexure from a volcano). Flexure is one observation of strength, but earthquakes can also be used to define the boundary between "strong" and "weak" rocks. Earthquakes are primarily constrained to occur within the old, cold, lithosphere to temperatures of up to ~650 °C. This criterion works particularly well in oceanic lithosphere, where it is reasonably simple to estimate the temperature at depth based upon the age of the rocks. The LAB is most shallow when using this definition. The MBL is rarely equated to the lithosphere, as in some tectonically active regions (e.g. the Basin and Range Province) the MBL is thinner than the crust and the LAB would be above the Mohorovičić discontinuity.

=== Thermal boundary layer (TBL) ===
The definition of the LAB as a thermal boundary layer (TBL) comes not from temperature, but instead from the dominant mechanism of heat transport. The lithosphere is unable to support convection cells because it is strong, but the convecting mantle beneath is much weaker. In this framework, the LAB separates the two heat transport regimes [conduction vs. convection]. However, the transition from a domain that transports heat primarily through convection in the asthenosphere to the conducting lithosphere is not necessarily abrupt and instead encompasses a broad zone of mixed or temporally variable heat transport. The top of the thermal boundary layer is the maximum depth at which heat is transported only by conduction. The bottom of the TBL is the shallowest depth at which heat is transported only by convection. At depths internal to the TBL, heat is transported by a combination of both conduction and convection.

=== Rheological boundary layer (RBL) ===
The LAB is a rheological boundary layer (RBL). Colder temperatures at Earth's shallower depths affect the viscosity and strength of the lithosphere. Colder material in the lithosphere resists flow while the "warmer" material in the asthenosphere contributes to its lower viscosity. The increase in temperature with increasing depth is known as the geothermal gradient and is gradual within the rheological boundary layer. In practice, the RBL is defined by the depth at which the viscosity of the mantle rocks drops below ~$10^{21} Pa\cdot s$.

However, mantle material is a non-Newtonian fluid, i.e. its viscosity depends also on the rate of deformation. This means that the LAB can change its position as a result of changes in the stresses.

=== Compositional boundary layer (CBL) ===
Another definition of the LAB involves differences in composition of the mantle at depth. Lithospheric mantle is ultramafic and has lost most of its volatile constituents, such as water, calcium, and aluminum. Knowledge of this depletion is based upon the composition of mantle xenoliths. The depth to the base of the CBL can be determined from the amount of forsterite within samples of olivine extracted from the mantle. This is because partial melting of primitive or asthenospheric mantle leaves behind a composition that is enriched in magnesium, with the depth at which the concentration of magnesium matches that of the primitive mantle being the base of the CBL.

== Measuring the LAB depth ==
=== Seismic observations ===
The seismic LAB (i.e. measured using seismological observations) is defined by the observation that there exists seismically fast lithosphere (or a lithospheric lid) above a low-velocity zone (LVZ). Seismic tomographic studies suggests that the LAB is not purely thermal, but rather is affected by partial melt. The cause of the LVZ could be explained by a variety of mechanisms. One way to determine if the LVZ is generated by partial melt is to measure the electrical conductivity of the Earth as a function of depth using magnetotelluric (MT) methods. Partial melt tends to increase conductivity, in which case the LAB can be defined as a boundary between the resistive lithosphere and conductive asthenosphere.

Because mantle flow induces the alignment of minerals (such as olivine) to generate observable anisotropy in seismic waves, another definition of the seismic LAB is the boundary between the anisotropic asthenosphere and the isotropic (or a different pattern of anisotropy) lithosphere.

The seismic LVZ was first recognized by Beno Gutenberg, whose name is sometimes used to refer to the base of the seismic LAB beneath oceanic lithosphere. The Gutenberg discontinuity coincides with the expected LAB depth in many studies and has also been found to become deeper under older crust, thus supporting the suggestion that the discontinuity is closely interrelated to the LAB. Evidence from converted seismic phases indicates a sharp decrease in shear wave velocity 90–110 km below continental crust. Recent seismological studies indicate a 5 to 10 percent reduction in shear-wave velocity in the depth range of 50 to 140 km beneath ocean basins.

=== Beneath oceanic lithosphere ===
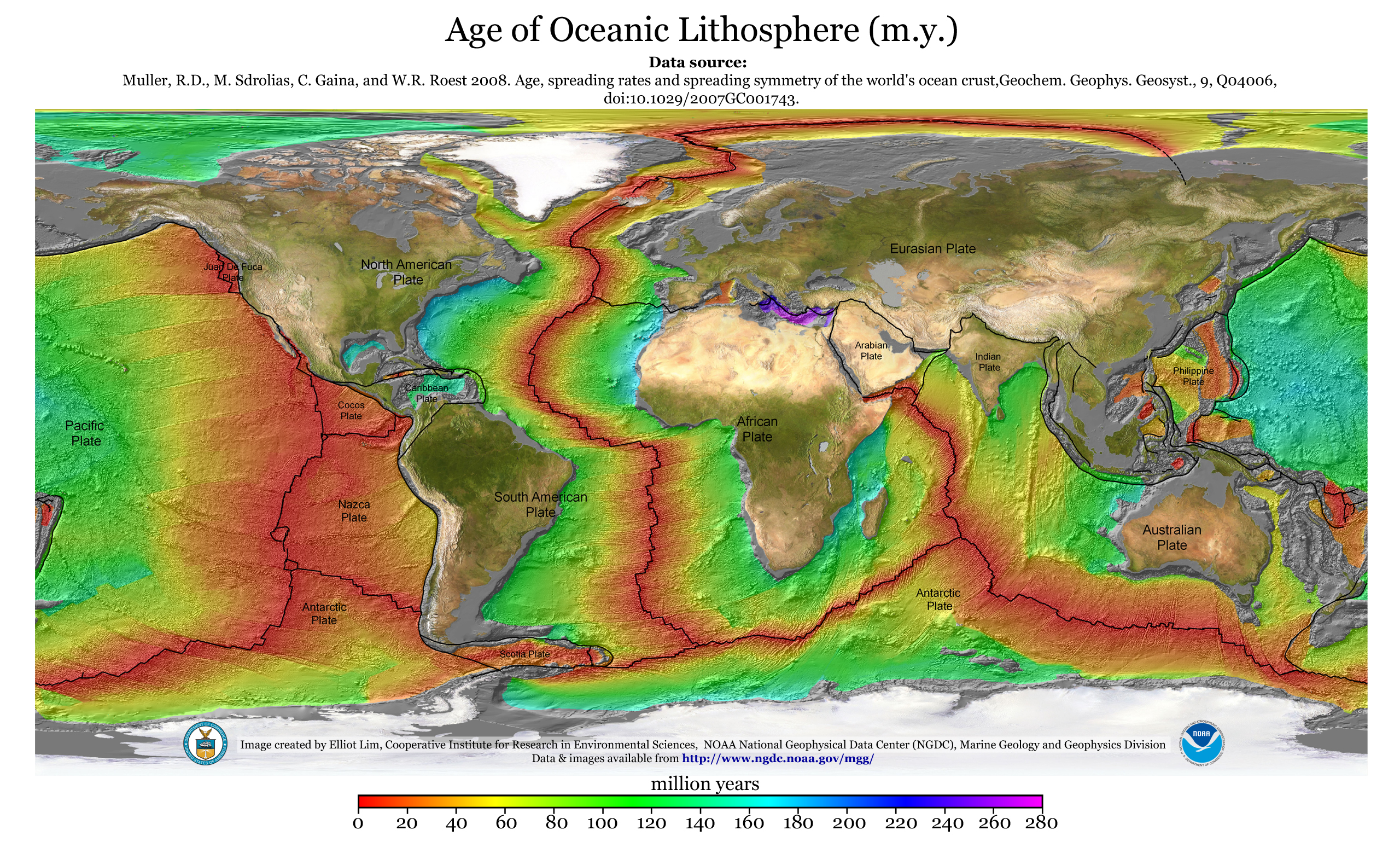
Age of oceanic lithosphere.

Beneath oceanic crust, the LAB ranges anywhere from 50 to 140 km in depth, except close to mid-ocean ridges where the LAB is no deeper than the depth of the new crust being created. Seismic evidence shows that oceanic plates do thicken with age. This suggests that the LAB underneath oceanic lithosphere also deepens with plate age. Data from ocean seismometers indicate a sharp age-dependent LAB beneath the Pacific and Philippine plates and has been interpreted as evidence for a thermal control of oceanic-lithosphere thickness.

=== Beneath continental lithosphere ===
The continental lithosphere contains ancient, stable parts known as cratons. The LAB is particularly difficult to study in these regions, with evidence suggesting that the lithosphere within this old part of the continent is at it thickest and even appears to exhibit large variations in thickness beneath the cratons, thus supporting the theory that lithosphere thickness and LAB depth are age-dependent. The LAB beneath these regions (composed of shields and platforms) is estimated to be between 200 and 250 km deep. Beneath Phanerozoic continental crust, the LAB is roughly 100 km deep.
