= Hafnium–tungsten dating =

Geochronological radiometric dating method using radioactive decay of hafnium-182

Hafnium–tungsten dating is a geochronological radiometric dating method utilizing the radioactive decay system of hafnium-182 to tungsten-182. The half-life of the system is 8.9±0.1 million years. Today hafnium-182 is an extinct radionuclide, but the hafnium–tungsten radioactive system is useful in studies of the early Solar System since hafnium is lithophilic while tungsten is moderately siderophilic, which allows the system to be used to date the differentiation of a planet's core. It is also useful in determining the formation times of the parent bodies of iron meteorites.

The use of the hafnium-tungsten system as a chronometer for the early Solar System was suggested in the 1980s, but did not come into widespread use until the mid-1990s when the development of multi-collector inductively coupled plasma mass spectrometry enabled the use of samples with low concentrations of tungsten.

== Basic principle ==
The radioactive system behind hafnium–tungsten dating is a two-stage decay as follows:

^{182}_{72}Hf → ^{182}_{73}Ta + e^{−} + ν̅_{e}

^{182}_{73}Ta → ^{182}_{74}W + e^{−} + ν̅_{e}

The first decay has a half-life of 8.9 million years, while the second has a half-life of only 114 days, such that the intermediate nuclide tantalum-182 (^{182}Ta) can effectively be ignored.

Since hafnium-182 is an extinct radionuclide, hafnium–tungsten chronometry is performed by examining the abundance of tungsten-182 relative to other stable isotopes of tungsten, of which there are effectively five in total, including the extremely long-lived isotope tungsten-180, which has a half-life much longer than the current age of the universe. The abundance of tungsten-182 can be influenced by processes other than the decay of hafnium-182, but the existence of a large number of stable isotopes is very helpful for disentangling variations in tungsten-182 due to a different cause. For example, while ^{182}W, ^{183}W, ^{184}W and ^{186}W are all produced by the r- and s-processes, the rare isotope tungsten-180 is only produced by the p-process. Variations in tungsten isotopes caused by r- and s-process nucleosynthetic contributions also result in correlated changes in the ratios ^{182}W/^{184}W and ^{183}W/^{184}W, which means that the ^{183}W/^{184}W ratio can be used to quantify how much of the tungsten-182 variation is due to nucleosynthetic contributions. The influence of cosmic rays is more difficult to correct for since cosmic ray interactions affect the abundance of tungsten-182 much more than any of the other tungsten isotopes. Nonetheless, cosmic ray effects can be corrected for by examining other isotope systems such as platinum, osmium or the stable isotopes of hafnium, or simply by taking samples from the interior that have not been exposed to cosmic rays, though the latter requires large samples.

Tungsten isotopic data is usually plotted in terms of ε^{182}W and ε^{183}W, which represent deviations in the ratios ^{182}W/^{184}W and ^{183}W/^{184}W in parts per 10,000 relative to terrestrial standards. Since Earth is differentiated the crust and mantle of Earth are enriched in tungsten-182 relative to the initial composition of the Solar System. Undifferentiated chondritic meteorites have ε^{182}W = −1.9±0.1 relative to Earth, which is extrapolated to give a value of −3.45±0.25 for the initial ε^{182}W of the Solar System.

== Dating planetary core formation ==
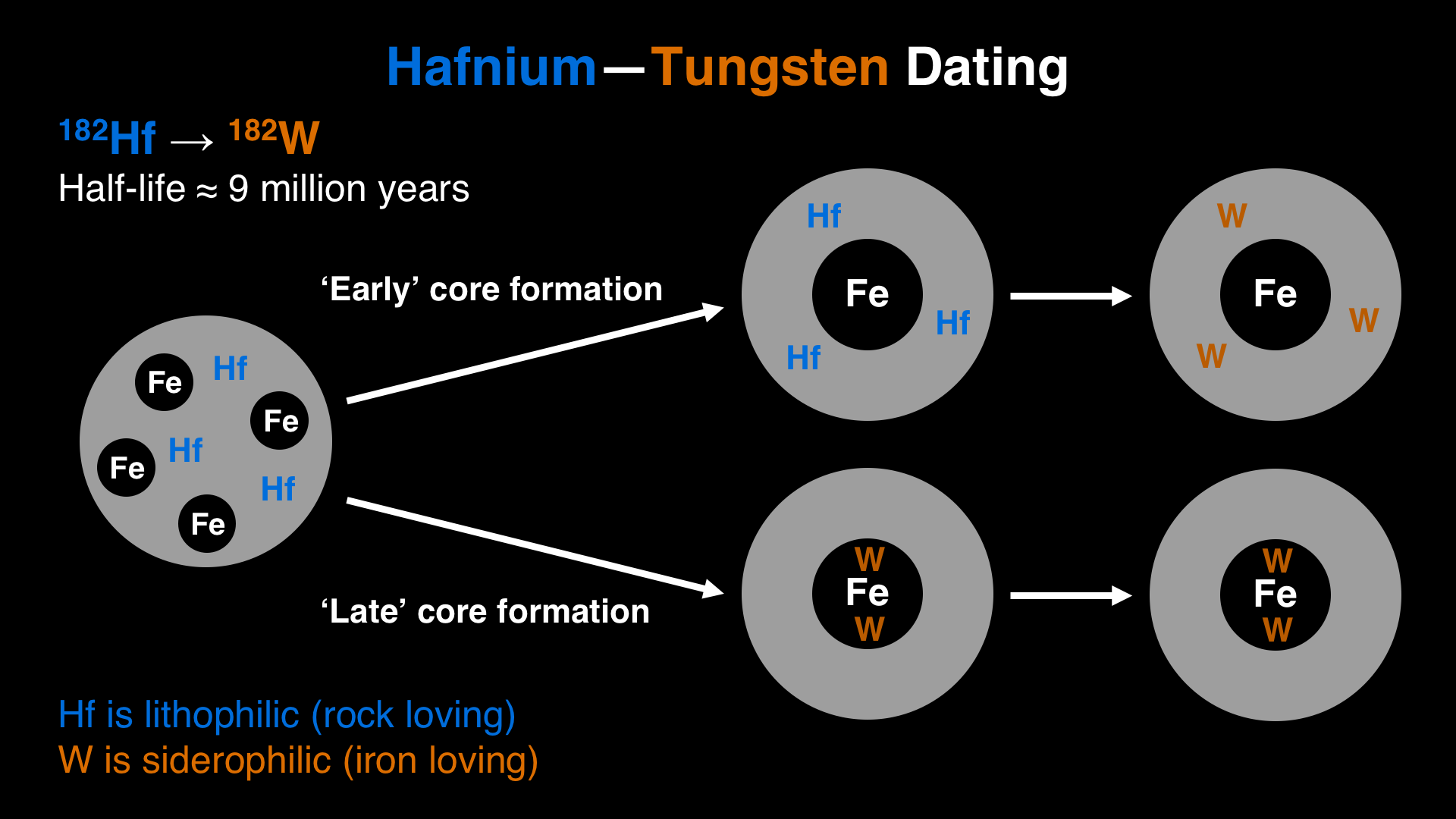
Illustration of how hafnium-tungsten dating can help quantify the time of differentiation (core formation) of a planet

A primordial planet is undifferentiated, meaning that it is not layered according to density (with the densest material being towards the interior of the planet). When a planet undergoes differentiation the dense materials, particularly iron, separate from lighter components and sink to the interior forming the core of the planet. If this process took place relatively early in a planet's history, hafnium-182 would not have sufficient time to decay to tungsten-182. Since hafnium is a lithophile element the (undecayed) hafnium-182 would remain in the mantle (i.e. the outer layers of the planet). Then, after some time, the hafnium-182 would decay to tungsten-182 leaving an excess of tungsten-182 in the mantle. On the other hand, if differentiation occurred later in a planet's history, then most of the hafnium-182 would have decayed to tungsten-182 before differentiation began. Being moderately siderophilic, much of the tungsten-182 would sink towards the interior of the planet along with iron. In this scenario, not much tungsten-182 would subsequently be present in the outer layers of the planet. As such, by looking at how much tungsten-182 is present in the outer layers of a planet, relative to other isotopes of tungsten, the time of differentiation can be quantified.

=== Model ages ===
If we have a sample from the mantle (or core) of a body and want to calculate a core formation age from the tungsten-182 abundance we need to also know the composition of the bulk planet. Since we do not have samples from the core of Earth (or any other intact planet) the composition of chondritic meteorites is generally substituted for that of the bulk planet. Hafnium and tungsten are both refractory elements so there is not expected to be any fractionation between hafnium and tungsten due to heating of the planet during or after formation. A model age for the time of core formation can then be calculated using the equation

$t=\frac{1}{\lambda}\ln \left ( \frac{(\epsilon^{182}{\rm W_{chondrite}}-\epsilon^{182}{\rm W_{SSI}})f^{\rm Hf/W}}{\epsilon^{182}{\rm W_{sample}}-\epsilon^{182}{\rm W_{chondrite}}} \right )$,

where $\lambda$ is the decay constant for hafnium-182 (0.078±0.002 Ma^{−1}), the ε^{182}W values are those of the sample, chondritic meteorites (taken to represent the bulk planet) and the Solar System Initial value, and $f^{Hf/W}$accounts for any differences in the general abundance of hafnium between the sample and chondritic meteorites,

$f^{Hf/W}=\frac{(^{180}{\rm Hf}/^{184}{\rm W})_{\rm sample}}{(^{180}{\rm Hf}/^{184}{\rm W})_{\rm chondrite}}-1$.

This equation assumes that core formation is instantaneous. This can be a reasonable assumption for small bodies, like iron meteorites, but is not true for large bodies like Earth whose accretion likely took many millions of years. Instead more complex models that model core formation as a continuous process are more reasonable, and should be used.

=== Core formation times for Solar System bodies ===
The method of hafnium-tungsten dating has been applied to many samples from Solar System bodies and used to provide estimates for the date of core formation. For iron meteorites hafnium-tungsten dating yields ages ranging from less than a million years after the formation of the first solids (calcium-aluminium-rich inclusions, usually called CAIs) to around 3 million years for different meteorite groups. While chondritic meteorites are not differentiated as a whole, hafnium-tungsten dating can still be useful for constraining formation ages by applying it to smaller melt regions in which metals and silicates have separated. For the very well studied carbonaceous chondrite Allende this gives a formation age of around 2.2 million years after the formation of CAIs. Martian meteorites have been examined and indicate that Mars may have been fully formed within 10 million years of the formation of CAIs, which has been used to suggest that Mars is a primordial planetary embryo. For Earth, models of accretion and core formation are strongly dependent on how much giant impacts, like that presumed to have formed the Moon, re-mixed the core and mantle, yielding dates of between 30 and 100 million years after CAIs depending on assumptions.

== See also ==
- Radiometric dating
- Isotope geochemistry
- Planetary differentiation
