= Gutenberg discontinuity =

Boundary between Earth's core and mantle

The Gutenberg discontinuity occurs within Earth's interior at a depth of about 2,900 km (1,800 mi) below the surface, where there is an abrupt change in the seismic waves (generated by earthquakes or explosions) that travel through Earth. At this depth, primary seismic waves (P waves) decrease in velocity while secondary seismic waves (S waves) disappear completely. S waves shear material, and cannot transmit through liquids, so it is believed that the unit above the discontinuity is solid, while the unit below is in a liquid, or molten, form. This distinct change marks the boundary between two sections of the earth's interior, known as the lower mantle (which is considered solid) and the underlying outer core (believed to be molten). The molten section of the outer core is thought to be about 700 °C (1,300 °F) hotter than the overlying mantle. It is also denser, probably due to a greater percentage of iron. This distinct boundary between the core and the mantle, which was discovered by the change in seismic waves at this depth, is often referred to as the core–mantle boundary, or the CMB. It is a narrow, uneven zone, and contains undulations that may be up to 5–8 km (3.1–5.0 mi) wide. These undulations are affected by the heat-driven convection activity within the overlying mantle, which may be the driving force of plate tectonics-motion of sections of Earth's brittle exterior. These undulations in the core–mantle boundary are also affected by the underlying eddies and currents within the outer core's iron-rich fluids, which are ultimately responsible for Earth's magnetic field.

The boundary between the core and the mantle does not remain constant. As the heat of the earth's interior is constantly but slowly dissipated, the molten core within Earth gradually solidifies and shrinks, causing the core–mantle boundary to slowly move deeper and deeper within Earth's core.

The Gutenberg discontinuity was named after Beno Gutenberg (1889–1960) a seismologist who made several important contributions to the study and understanding of the Earth's interior. It has also been referred to as the Oldham–Gutenberg discontinuity (after Richard Dixon Oldham), or the Wiechert–Gutenberg discontinuity (after Emil Wiechert).

== See also ==
- Lithosphere–asthenosphere boundary
- Mohorovičić discontinuity
