= Core–mantle boundary =

Discontinuity where the bottom of the planet's mantle meets the outer layer of the core

Schematic view of the interior of Earth.: 1. continental crust; 2. oceanic crust; 3. upper mantle; 4. lower mantle; 5. outer core; 6. inner core; 1. Mohorovicic discontinuity; 2. core–mantle boundary; 3. outer core–inner core boundary

The core–mantle boundary (CMB) of Earth lies between the planet's silicate mantle and its liquid iron–nickel outer core, at a depth of 2,891 km (1,796 mi) below Earth's surface. The boundary is observed via the discontinuity in seismic wave velocities at that depth due to the differences between the acoustic impedances of the solid mantle and the molten outer core. P-wave velocities are much slower in the outer core than in the deep mantle while S-waves do not exist at all in the liquid portion of the core. Recent evidence suggests a distinct boundary layer directly above the CMB possibly made of a novel phase of the basic perovskite mineralogy of the deep mantle named post-perovskite. Seismic tomography studies have shown significant irregularities within the boundary zone and appear to be dominated by the African and Pacific large low-shear-velocity provinces (LLSVP).

The uppermost section of the outer core is thought to be about 500–1,800 K hotter than the overlying mantle, creating a thermal boundary layer. The boundary is thought to harbor topography, much like Earth's surface, that is supported by solid-state convection within the overlying mantle. Variations in the thermal properties of the CMB may affect how the outer core's iron-rich fluids flow, which are ultimately responsible for Earth's magnetic field.

== D″ region ==
An approximately 200 km thick layer of the lower mantle directly above the CMB is referred to as the D″ region ("D double-prime" or "D prime prime") and is sometimes included in discussions regarding the core–mantle boundary zone. The D″ name originates from geophysicist Keith Bullen's designations for the Earth's layers. His system was to label each layer alphabetically, A through G, with the crust as 'A' and the inner core as 'G'. In his 1942 publication of his model, the entire lower mantle was the D layer. In 1949, Bullen found his 'D' layer to actually be two different layers. The upper part of the D layer, about 1,800 km thick, was renamed D′ (D prime) and the lower part (the bottom 200 km) was named D″. Later it was found that D" is non-spherical. In 1993, Czechowski found that inhomogeneities in D" form structures analogous to continents (i.e. core-continents). They move in time and determine some properties of hotspots and mantle convection. Later research supported this hypothesis.

== Seismic discontinuity ==
A seismic discontinuity occurs within Earth's interior at a depth of about 2,900 km (1,800 mi) below the surface, where there is an abrupt change in the speed of seismic waves (generated by earthquakes or explosions) that travel through Earth. At this depth, primary seismic waves (P waves) decrease in velocity while secondary seismic waves (S waves) disappear completely. S waves shear material and cannot transmit through liquids, so it is thought that the unit above the discontinuity is solid, while the unit below is in a liquid or molten form.

The discontinuity was discovered by Beno Gutenberg, a seismologist who made several important contributions to the study and understanding of the Earth's interior. The CMB has also been referred to as the Gutenberg discontinuity, the Oldham-Gutenberg discontinuity, or the Wiechert-Gutenberg discontinuity. In modern times, however, the term Gutenberg discontinuity or the "G" is most commonly used in reference to a decrease in seismic velocity with depth that is sometimes observed at about 100 km below the Earth's oceans.

== See also ==
- Core–mantle differentiation
- Ultra low velocity zone
