= Earth's outer core =

Fluid layer between Earth's solid inner core and its mantle

Earth and atmosphere structure

Earth's outer core is a fluid layer about 2,260 km (1,400 mi) thick, composed of mostly iron and nickel that lies above Earth's solid inner core and below its mantle. The outer core begins approximately 2,889 km (1,795 mi) beneath Earth's surface at the core-mantle boundary and ends 5,150 km (3,200 mi) beneath Earth's surface at the inner core boundary.

== Properties ==
The outer core of Earth is liquid, unlike its inner core, which is solid. Evidence for a fluid outer core includes seismology which shows that seismic shear-waves are not transmitted through the outer core. Although having a composition similar to Earth's solid inner core, the outer core remains liquid as there is not enough pressure to keep it in a solid state.

Seismic inversions of body waves and normal modes constrain the radius of the outer core to be 3483 km with an uncertainty of 5 km, while that of the inner core is 1220±10 km.

Estimates for the temperature of the outer core are about 3,000–4,500 K (2,700–4,200 °C; 4,900–7,600 °F) in its outer region and 4,000–8,000 K (3,700–7,700 °C; 6,700–14,000 °F) near the inner core. Modeling has shown that the outer core, because of its high temperature, is a low-viscosity fluid that convects turbulently. The dynamo theory sees eddy currents in the nickel-iron fluid of the outer core as the principal source of Earth's magnetic field. The average magnetic field strength in Earth's outer core is estimated to be 2.5 millitesla, 50 times stronger than the magnetic field at the surface.

As Earth's core cools, the liquid at the inner core boundary freezes, causing the solid inner core to grow at the expense of the outer core, at an estimated rate of 1 mm per year. This is approximately 80,000 tonnes of iron per second.

The fluid in Earth's outer core convects up to about 1 millimeter per second, roughly 30 kilometers per year.The movement is driven by thermal convection and chemical convection.

== Light elements ==
=== Composition ===
Earth's outer core cannot be entirely constituted of iron or iron-nickel alloy because their densities are higher than geophysical measurements of the density of Earth's outer core. The outer core is approximately 5 to 10 percent lower density than iron at Earth's core temperatures and pressures. Hence it has been proposed that light elements with low atomic numbers compose part of Earth's outer core, as the only feasible way to lower its density.

Although Earth's outer core is inaccessible to direct sampling, the composition of light elements can be meaningfully constrained by high-pressure experiments, calculations based on seismic measurements, models of Earth's accretion, and carbonaceous chondrite meteorite comparisons with bulk silicate Earth (BSE). As of 2023, estimates are that Earth's outer core is composed of iron along with 0 to 0.26 percent hydrogen, 0.2 percent carbon, 0.8 to 5.3 percent oxygen, 0 to 4.0 percent silicon, 1.7 percent sulfur, and 5 percent nickel by weight, and the temperature of the core-mantle boundary and the inner core boundary ranges from 4,137 to 4,300 K and from 5,400 to 6,300 K respectively.

==== Constraints ====
===== Accretion =====
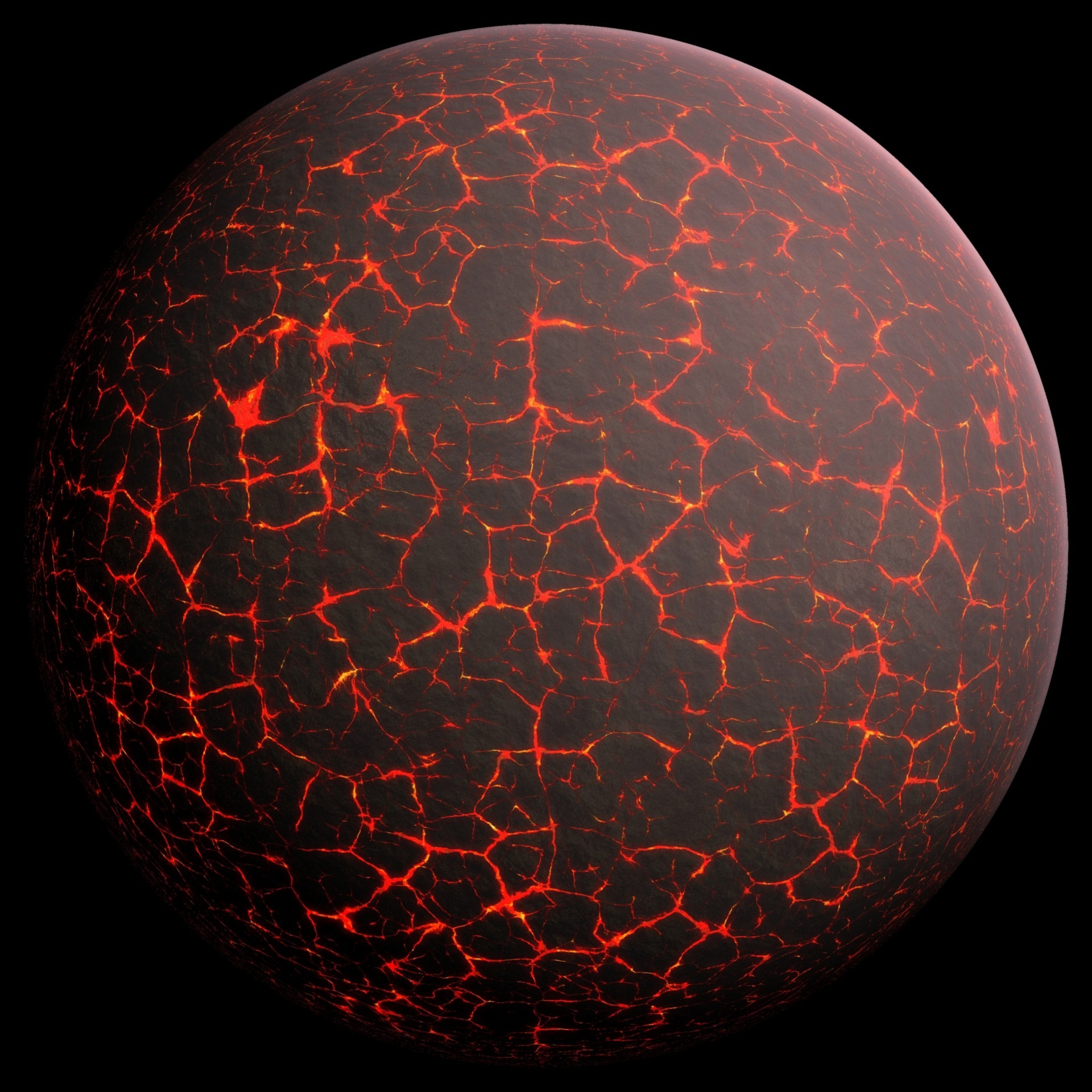
An artist's illustration of what Earth might have looked like early in its formation.

The variety of light elements present in Earth's outer core is constrained in part by Earth's accretion. Namely, the light elements contained must have been abundant during Earth's formation, must be able to partition into liquid iron at low pressures, and must not volatilize and escape during Earth's accretionary process.

===== CI chondrites =====
CI chondritic meteorites are believed to contain the same planet-forming elements in the same proportions as in the early Solar System, so differences between CI meteorites and BSE can provide insights into the light element composition of Earth's outer core. For instance, the depletion of silicon in Earth's primitive mantle compared to CI meteorites may indicate that silicon was absorbed into Earth's core; however, a wide range of silicon concentrations in Earth's outer and inner core is still possible.

=== Implications for Earth's accretion and core formation history ===
Tighter constraints on the concentrations of light elements in Earth's outer core would provide a better understanding of Earth's accretion and core formation history.

==== Consequences for Earth's accretion ====
Models of Earth's accretion could be better tested if we had better constraints on light element concentrations in Earth's outer core. For example, accretionary models based on core-mantle element partitioning tend to support proto-Earths constructed from reduced, condensed, and volatile-free material, despite the possibility that oxidized material from the outer Solar System was accreted towards the conclusion of Earth's accretion. If we could better constrain the concentrations of hydrogen, oxygen, and silicon in Earth's outer core, models of Earth's accretion that match these concentrations would presumably better constrain Earth's formation.

==== Consequences for Earth's core formation ====
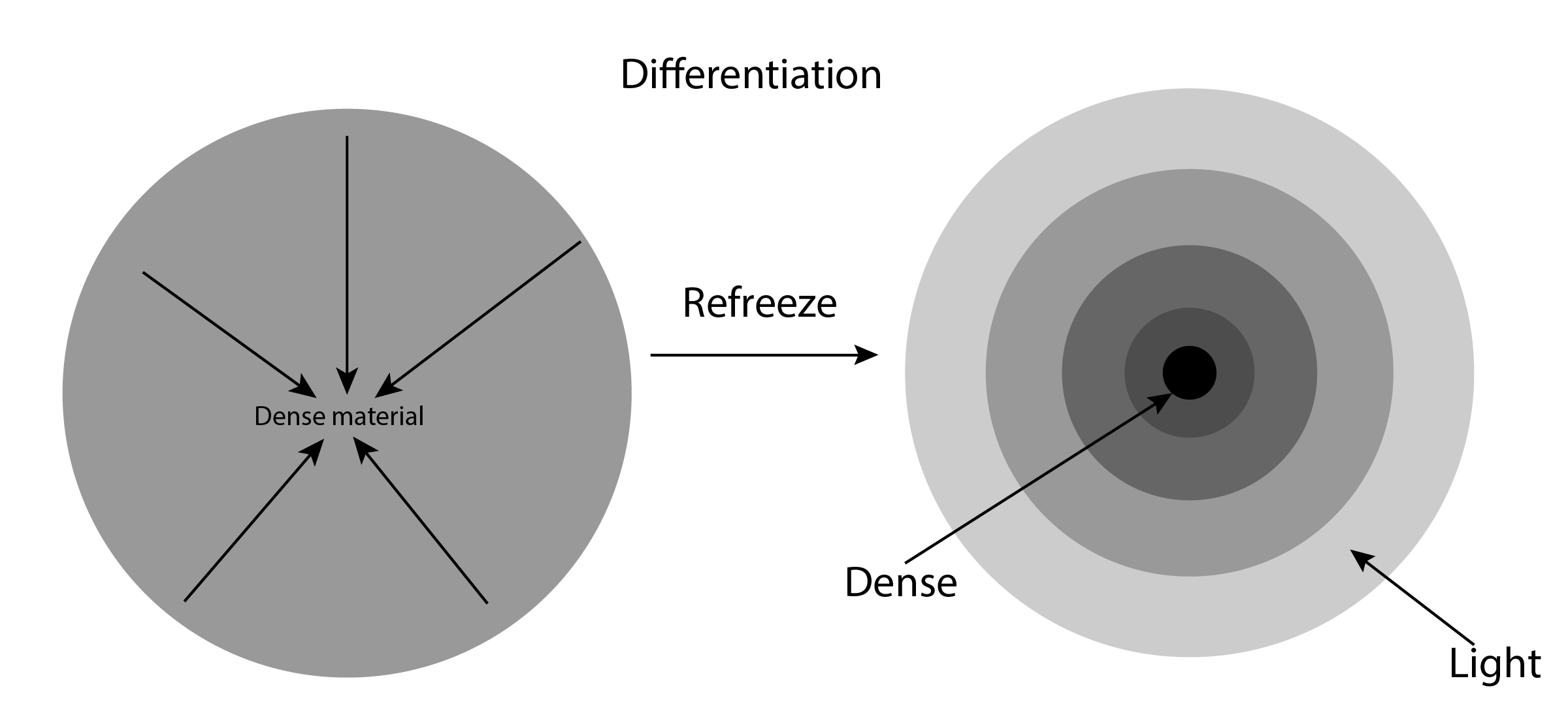
A diagram of Earth's differentiation. The light elements sulfur, silicon, oxygen, carbon, and hydrogen may constitute part of the outer core due to their abundance and ability to partition into liquid iron under certain conditions.

The depletion of siderophile elements in Earth's mantle compared to chondritic meteorites is attributed to metal-silicate reactions during formation of Earth's core. These reactions are dependent on oxygen, silicon, and sulfur, so better constraints on concentrations of these elements in Earth's outer core will help elucidate the conditions of formation of Earth's core.

In another example, the possible presence of hydrogen in Earth's outer core suggests that the accretion of Earth's water was not limited to the final stages of Earth's accretion and that water may have been absorbed into core-forming metals through a hydrous magma ocean.

=== Implications for Earth's magnetic field ===
A diagram of Earth's geodynamo and magnetic field, which could have been driven in Earth's early history by the crystallization of magnesium oxide, silicon dioxide, and iron(II) oxide.

Earth's magnetic field is driven by thermal convection and also by chemical convection, the exclusion of light elements from the inner core, which float upward within the fluid outer core while denser elements sink. This chemical convection releases gravitational energy that is then available to power the geodynamo that produces Earth's magnetic field. Carnot efficiencies with large uncertainties suggest that compositional and thermal convection contribute about 80 percent and 20 percent respectively to the power of Earth's geodynamo.

Traditionally it was thought that prior to the formation of Earth's inner core, Earth's geodynamo was mainly driven by thermal convection. However, as of 2020, claims that the thermal conductivity of iron at core temperatures and pressures is much higher than previously thought imply that core cooling was largely by conduction not convection, limiting the ability of thermal convection to drive the geodynamo. This conundrum is known as the new "core paradox." An alternative process that could have sustained Earth's geodynamo requires Earth's core to have initially been hot enough to dissolve oxygen, magnesium, silicon, and other light elements. As the Earth's core began to cool, it would become supersaturated in these light elements that would then precipitate into the lower mantle forming oxides leading to a different variant of chemical convection.

The magnetic field generated by core flow is essential to protect life from interplanetary radiation and prevent the atmosphere from dissipating in the solar wind. The rate of cooling by conduction and convection is uncertain, but one estimate is that the core would not be expected to freeze up for approximately 91 billion years, which is well after the Sun is expected to expand, sterilize the surface of the planet, and then burn out.

== See also ==
- Hollow Earth
- Geological history of Earth
- Large low-shear-velocity provinces
- Lehmann discontinuity
- Rain-out model
- Seismic tomography – technique for imaging the subsurface of Earth using seismic waves
- Travel to the Earth's center
- Solid earth
