= Core–mantle differentiation =

Separation of materials resulting in a distinct planetary mantle and core

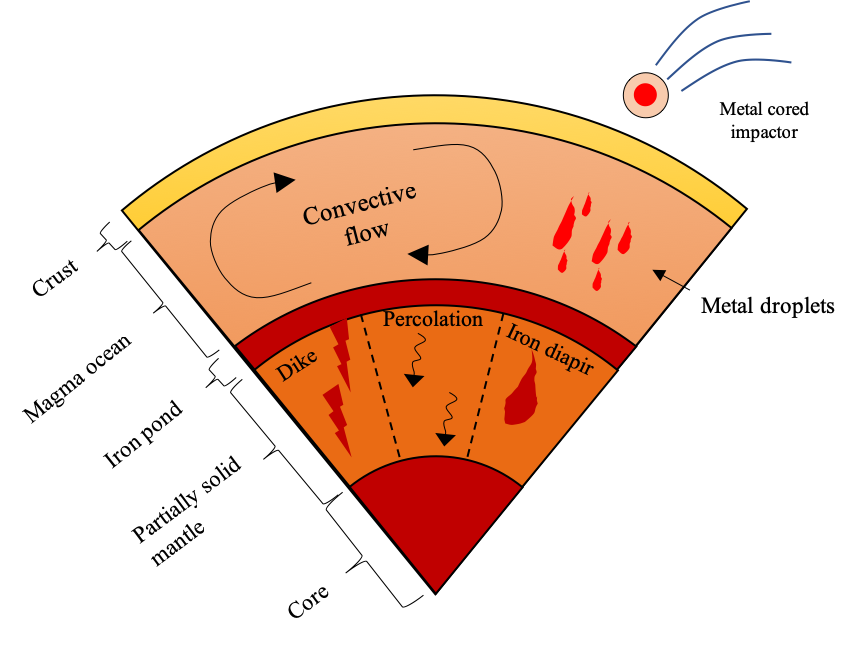
Hypothetical core-mantle differentiation processes: Percolation, diking, and diapirism. After Rubie et al. (2015).

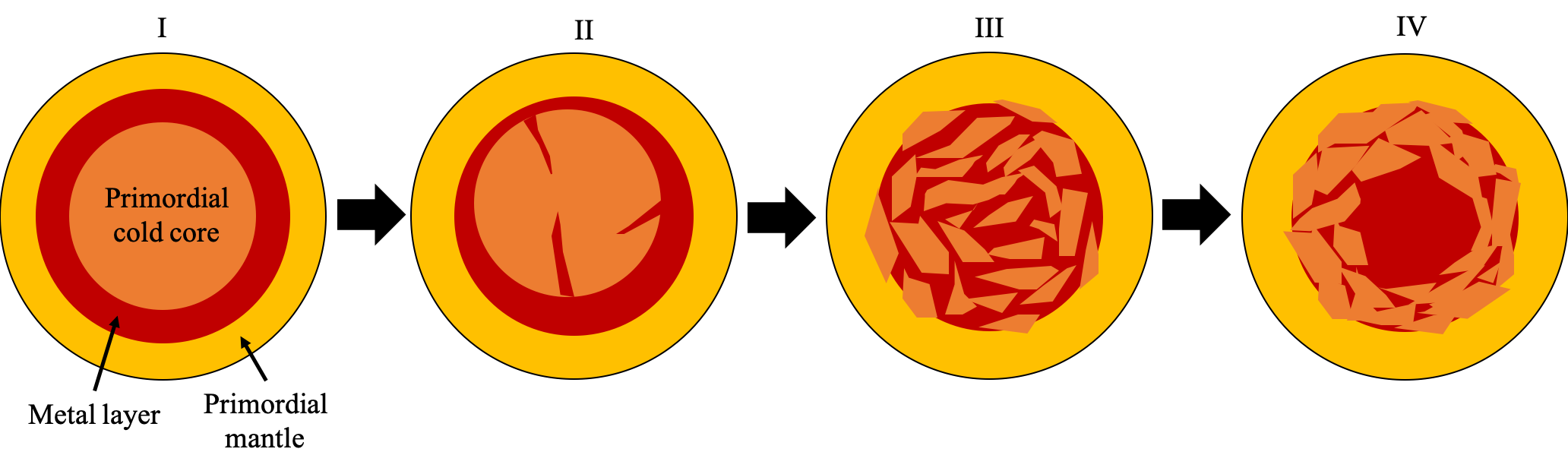
Alternative model for core-mantle differentiation: I. Melted iron layer between protomantle and primordial core. II. Primordial core cracking. III. Primordial core fragments. IV. Rockbergs ascend and iron forms new core. After Stevenson (1981).

Core–mantle differentiation is the set of processes that took place during the accretion stage of Earth's evolution (or more generally, of rocky planets) that results in the separation of iron-rich materials that eventually would conform a metal core, surrounded by a rocky mantle. According to the Safronov's model, protoplanets formed as the result of collisions of smaller bodies (planetesimals), which previously condensed from solid debris present in the original nebula. Planetesimals contained iron and silicates either already differentiated or mixed together. Either way, after impacting the Proto-Earth their materials very likely became homogenized. At this stage, the Proto-Earth was probably the size of Mars. Next followed the separation and stratification of the Proto-Earth's constituents, chiefly driven by their density contrasts. Factors such as pressure, temperature, and impact bodies in the primordial magma ocean were involved in the differentiation process.

The differentiation process is driven by the higher density of iron compared to silicate rocks, but the lower melting point of the former constitutes an important factor. In fact, once iron has melted, differentiation can take place whether silicate rocks are completely melted or not. On the premises of these plausible scenarios, several models have been proposed to account for the core-mantle differentiation following the stage of nebular formation of the Solar System. They can be summarized into three mechanisms: 1) Percolation of iron alloy through silicate crystals; 2) Separation of metal from rock in a primordial magma ocean; 3) Migration of iron diapirs or dikes through the mantle.

== Percolation ==
Under the assumption of a solid mantle and melted iron mixture, the percolation mechanism involves metal flowing along solid mantle crystal grain boundaries towards the center of the Earth. This hypothesis assumes that rocky materials remain solid or soft, while iron is molten. The surface tension of iron drops cannot be physically larger than the dragging exerted by the comparatively more viscous mantle, hence limiting the size of the iron droplets.

The percolation hypothesis assumes that crystals in the mantle have no preferred orientation. Likewise, percolation requires the dihedral angle between melt and crystals to be less than 60 degrees to maintain connectivity. However, measurements at the surface suggest that the dihedral angle is frequently greater than 60 degrees, thereby limiting the occurrence of percolation, although it is uncertain whether it may be less than 60 degrees in the lower mantle. Traces of iron have not been observed in the upper mantle, which would be expected had percolation dominated there. Another argument against percolation as a dominant mechanism of iron migration is that it requires temperature to stay within a narrow margin, above the iron solidus but below rock solidus.

== Magma ocean ==
Energy release during the impact of large bodies could have partially or totally melted the Earth producing a magma ocean, conceivably more than once during the Earth's formation. Even if initial melting surrounds only the impact area, isostatic equilibrium would globally re-distribute magma, albeit the timescale of such redistribution in comparison to the timescale of iron-silicate differentiation remains uncertain. Once both rock and metal are melted, separation easily takes place driven by density contrast. Models suggest that melting could have occurred as soon as a planet radius becomes ~ 2000 to 3000 km. Likewise, some models predict occurrence of magma oceans at depths down to 300 km. The lower mantle may have never been completely melted because its melting temperature rises at a rate of 1 Kelvin/km. It still remains uncertain whether a single stage long-lasting magma ocean took place, or rather several episodes of rapid-cooling magma oceans during periodic impact events. Experiments suggest that viscosity of the magma ocean was low, thereby implying turbulent convective flow that rapidly dissipates heat. If true, the magma ocean can only have existed for a few thousands years.

Iron droplets in the magma ocean existed in a variety of sizes depending on the size of the bodies impacting the Earth. In molten state large bodies tend to break, whereas small bodies tend to coalesce. The equilibrium is found by the Weber number that provides a mean to calculate the stabilized diameter of the liquid iron droplets, which corresponds to 10 cm. After iron droplets form they segregate from the surrounding silicates and precipitate in a "rain".

== Diapirism and diking ==
Large iron blobs cannot be dragged by convective forces in the primordial mantle, therefore they do not have enough time to hydrodynamically equilibrate and reach the stabilized size. Hence, they deposit at a rheological boundary (such as present day lithosphere-asthenosphere boundary), forming iron ponds. Eventually, ponded iron would sink into the comparatively less dense silicates underneath them. The mechanism is thought to resemble salt diapirs. However, notwithstanding the fact that the mantle underlying the magma ocean is not brittle, according to some studies it is possible that the difference in viscosity between the iron ponds and the mantle was enough to allow the formation of dikes rather than diapirs. For today's conditions, iron diking has been devised as a viable strategy to send a probe to study the Earth's interior.

== Other core-mantle differentiation models ==
=== Elsasser's model ===
Temperature models predict melting of the disseminated iron alloy while silicate rocks soften at the upper level. The heat source is radioactive decay. Liquid iron migrated downward to levels where cooler temperatures kept silicates solidified, forming an iron layer on top of an undifferentiated material core, and below the primordial mantle in which impact-induced convection flow develops. From this stage on, iron aggregations triggered by Rayleigh-Taylor instabilities migrated through the primordial core in a long-term process (hundreds of millions of years).

=== Vityazev and Mayeva's model ===
Rather than the iron aggregations proposed by Elsasser, this model proposes that the iron shell melted at the boundary with the primordial core, and permeated through the latter in liquid state instead of aggregating into iron bulbs as proposed in the Safronov's model. The primordial core would ascend in grain-size bodies until incorporating into the mantle. The time-scale for the core formation is of the order of billion years.

=== Stevenson's model ===
One plausible scenario is that the primordial, cold silicate core fragmented in response to instabilities induced by the denser surrounding iron layer. At the end, chunks of such a fragmented core ("rockbergs") migrated upward and incorporated into the mantle, whereas the iron alloy settled at the center of the Earth. This process would take place faster than the two models mentioned above.
