= Solid earth =

Earth, minus the oceans and atmosphere

Solid earth refers to "the earth beneath our feet" or terra firma, the planet's solid surface and its interior. It excludes the Earth's fluid envelopes, the atmosphere and hydrosphere (but includes the ocean basin), as well as the biosphere and interactions with the Sun.

Solid-earth science refers to the corresponding methods of study, a subset of Earth sciences, predominantly geophysics and geology, excluding aeronomy, atmospheric sciences, oceanography, hydrology, and ecology.

== See also ==
- Ad cœlum – Principle of property law concerning air and subsurface rights
- Crust (geology) – Outermost solid shell of astronomical bodies
  - Earth's crust – Earth's outer shell of rock
- Geosphere – Collective name for the lithosphere, the hydrosphere, the cryosphere, and the atmosphere
- Journal of Geophysical Research - section B (Solid Earth) – Peer-reviewed scientific journal
- Land – Earth's dry surface
- Landform – Feature of the solid surface of a planetary body
- Landscape – Visible features of a land area
- Lithosphere – Outermost shell of a terrestrial-type planet or natural satellite
- Pedosphere – Outermost layer of the Earth
- Solid Earth (journal)
- Structure of the Earth – Interior of the earth
- Terrain – Dimension and shape of land surfaces
