= Iron catastrophe =

Possible geologic event in Earth's early history

The iron catastrophe is a postulated major geological event early in the history of Earth, where heavy metals such as iron and nickel congregated in the core during a geologically brief period.

The original accretion of the Earth's material into a spherical mass is thought to have resulted in a relatively uniform composition. While residual heat from the collision of the material that formed the Earth was significant, heating from radioactive materials in this mass gradually increased the temperature until a critical condition was reached. As material became molten enough to allow movement, the denser iron and nickel, previously evenly distributed throughout the mass, began to migrate to the center of the planet to form the core. The gravitational potential energy released by the sinking of the dense NiFe globules, along with any cooler, denser solid material, is thought to have been a runaway process, increasing the temperature of the protoplanet above the melting point of most components, resulting in the rapid formation of a molten iron core covered by a deep global silicate magma. This event, an important process of planetary differentiation, occurred at about 500 million years into the formation of the planet.

== Formation of Earth's magnetosphere ==
This large spinning mass of super-hot metal is responsible for the formation of the Earth's magnetic field, the magnetosphere, which protects the Earth from solar wind and the most harmful components of solar radiation coming from the Sun. The magnetosphere protects both Earth's atmosphere and life to the present day and distinguishes the planet from its close celestial neighbour, Mars, which no longer has a significant magnetic field nor comparable atmosphere. The term catastrophe is, here, in the mathematical sense of "a large, sudden change or discontinuity", as contrasted with "a disaster", because this event was necessary for life to emerge and evolve on Earth: without it, Earth's atmosphere would have been, as on Mars, stripped away by solar wind long before the present epoch.

Another theory, however, suggests Mars did once experience its own iron catastrophe and was once shielded by a magnetosphere. By this theory Mars has simply cooled faster than the Earth, gradually solidifying its dynamic iron center, hence shutting down its magnetosphere. The finding of signs of liquid water once existing on Mars suggests that it once had its own magnetic shield to keep the water in the atmosphere of the planet from being blown into space by solar wind.

== See also ==
- Rain-out model
