= Internal structure of Earth =

Geological cross section of Earth, showing the different layers of the interior.

The internal structure of Earth is the spatial variation of chemical and physical properties in the solid Earth. The primary structure is a series of layers: Its mechanical structure is of a rigid lithosphere, a semi-fluid asthenosphere, a semi-fluid mesosphere, a liquid outer core, and a solid, rigid inner core. Its chemical structure is of a silicate crust, a ferromagnesian mantle, and an iron-nickel core whose flowing upper portion generates the Earth's magnetic field.

Scientific understanding of the internal structure of Earth is based on observations of topography and bathymetry, observations of rock in outcrop, samples brought to the surface from greater depths by volcanoes or volcanic activity, analysis of the seismic waves that pass through Earth, measurements of the gravitational and magnetic fields of Earth, and experiments with crystalline solids at pressures and temperatures characteristic of Earth's deep interior.

== Global properties ==
Chemical composition of the upper internal structure of Earth
Chemical element/oxide	Chondrite model (1) (%)	Chondrite model (2) (%)
MgO	26.3	38.1
Al_{2}O_{3}	2.7	3.9
SiO_{2}	29.8	43.2
CaO	2.6	3.9
FeO	6.4	9.3
Other oxides	N/A	5.5
	25.8	N/A
Ni	1.7	N/A
Si	3.5	N/A

Note: In chondrite model (1), the light element in the core is assumed to be Si. Chondrite model (2) is a model of chemical composition of the mantle corresponding to the model of core shown in chondrite model (1).

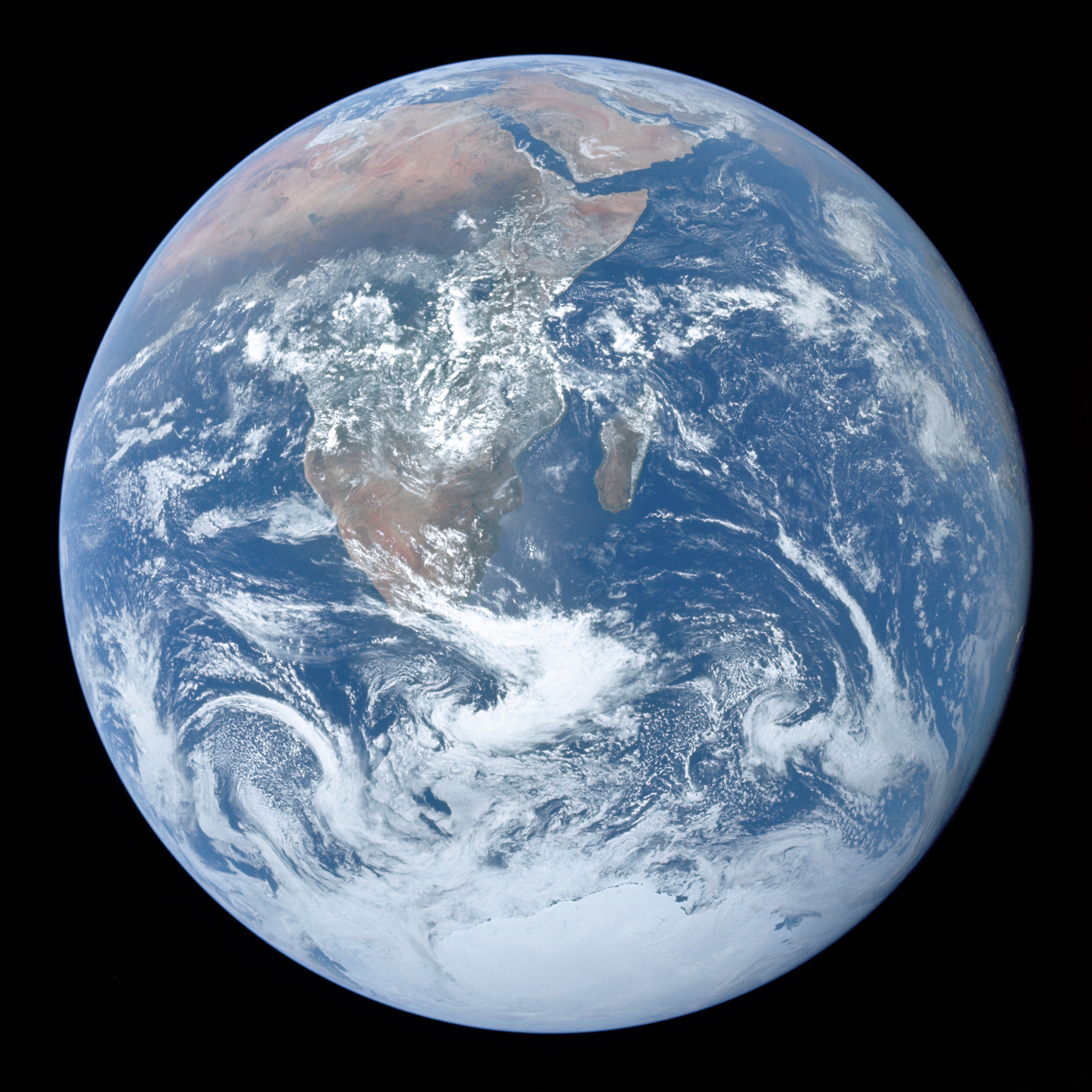
A photograph of Earth taken by the crew of Apollo 17 in 1972. A processed version became widely known as The Blue Marble.

Measurements of the force exerted by Earth's gravity can be used to calculate its mass. Astronomers can also calculate Earth's mass by observing the motion of orbiting satellites. Earth's average density can be determined through gravimetric experiments, which have historically involved pendulums. The mass of Earth is about 6×10^{24} kg. The average density of Earth is 5.515 g/cm^{3}.

== Layers ==
Schematic view of Earth's interior structure.: 1. continental crust; 2. oceanic crust; 3. upper mantle; 4. lower mantle; 5. outer core; 6. inner core; 1. Mohorovičić discontinuity; 2. core–mantle boundary; 3. outer core–inner core boundary

The geologic layers of Earth are at increasing depths below the surface of the earth. How these layers are assigned names, and thus how the planet’s structure is described, depends on the scientific approach.

Compositionally, the Earth’s layers are classified by their chemistry as the crust (an outer layer chiefly of silicate minerals—more specifically, dense basaltic oceanic crust and slightly less dense granitic continental crust), the mantle (an upper layer high in mafic rock and a lower layer high in bridgmanite and ferropericlase), and the core (an iron-nickel central layer).

Mechanically, in contrast, Earth’s physical and particularly rheological properties and behaviors give rise to layers called the lithosphere (a rigid, brittle outer shell comprising both the crust and the very top of the upper mantle); the asthenosphere (a ductile, semi-fluid layer, chiefly of the upper mantle, where tectonic plates float and move); the mesosphere, or mesospheric mantle (also called the subasthenospheric mantle, a layer of the lower mantle where high pressures solidify the rock, and not to be confused with the atmospheric mesosphere); and a liquid outer core and a solid inner core.

The differing nature of the layers represented by these two approaches aligns only partially, and so their names are usually not intermingled in geology.

=== Crust and lithosphere ===
Earth's major plates, which are: Pacific Plate; African Plate; North American Plate; Eurasian Plate; Antarctic Plate; Indo-Australian Plate; South American Plate

Earth's crust ranges from 5 to 70 kilometres (3.1–43.5 mi) in depth and is the outermost layer. The thin parts are the oceanic crust, which underlies the ocean basins (5–10 km) and is mafic-rich (dense iron-magnesium silicate mineral or igneous rock). The thicker crust is the continental crust, which is less dense and is felsic-rich (igneous rocks rich in elements that form feldspar and quartz). The rocks of the crust fall into two major categories – sial (aluminium silicate) and sima (magnesium silicate). It is estimated that sima starts about 11 km below the Conrad discontinuity, though the discontinuity is not distinct and can be absent in some continental regions.

Earth's lithosphere consists of the crust and the uppermost mantle. The crust-mantle boundary occurs as two physically different phenomena. The Mohorovičić discontinuity is a distinct change of seismic wave velocity. This is caused by a change in the rock's density – immediately above the Moho, the velocities of primary seismic waves (P wave) are consistent with those through basalt (6.7–7.2 km/s), and below they are similar to those through peridotite or dunite (7.6–8.6 km/s). Second, in oceanic crust, there is a chemical discontinuity between ultramafic cumulates and tectonized harzburgite, which has been observed from deep parts of the oceanic crust that have been obducted onto the continental crust and preserved as ophiolite sequences.

Many rocks making up Earth's crust formed less than 100 million years ago; however, the oldest known mineral grains are about 4.4 billion years old, indicating that Earth has had a solid crust for at least 4.4 billion years.

=== Mantle ===
Earth's crust and mantle, Mohorovičić discontinuity between bottom of crust and solid uppermost mantle

Earth's mantle extends to a depth of 2,890 km (1,800 mi), making it the planet's thickest layer. [This is 45% of the 6,371 km (3,959 mi) radius, and 83.7% of the volume - 0.6% of the volume is the crust]. The mantle is divided into upper and lower mantle separated by a transition zone. The lowest part of the mantle next to the core-mantle boundary is known as the D″ (D-double-prime) layer. The pressure at the bottom of the mantle is ≈140 GPa (1.4 Matm). The mantle is composed of silicate rocks richer in iron and magnesium than the overlying crust. Although solid, the mantle's extremely hot silicate material can flow over very long timescales. Convection of the mantle propels the motion of the tectonic plates in the crust. The source of heat that drives this motion is the decay of radioactive isotopes in Earth's crust and mantle combined with the initial heat from the planet's formation (from the potential energy released by collapsing a large amount of matter into a gravity well, and the kinetic energy of accreted matter).

Due to increasing pressure deeper in the mantle, the lower part flows less easily, though chemical changes within the mantle may also be important. The viscosity of the mantle ranges between 10^{21} and 10^{24} pascal-second, increasing with depth. In comparison, the viscosity of water at 300 K (27 °C; 80 °F) is 0.89 millipascal-second and pitch is (2.3 ± 0.5) × 10^{8} pascal-seconds.

=== Core ===
A diagram of Earth's geodynamo and magnetic field, which could have been driven in Earth's early history by the crystallization of magnesium oxide, silicon dioxide, and iron(II) oxide

Earth's outer core is a fluid layer about 2,260 km (1,400 mi) in height (i.e. distance from the highest point to the lowest point at the edge of the inner core) [36% of the Earth's radius, 15.6% of the volume] and composed of mostly iron and nickel that lies above Earth's solid inner core and below its mantle. Its outer boundary lies 2,890 km (1,800 mi) beneath Earth's surface. The transition between the inner core and outer core is located approximately 5,150 km (3,200 mi) beneath Earth's surface. Earth's inner core is the innermost geologic layer of the planet Earth. It is primarily a solid ball with a radius of about 1,220 km (760 mi), which is about 19% of Earth's radius [0.7% of volume] or 70% of the Moon's radius.

The inner core was discovered in 1936 by Inge Lehmann and is composed primarily of iron and some nickel. Since this layer is able to transmit shear waves (transverse seismic waves), it must be solid. Experimental evidence has at times been inconsistent with current crystal models of the core. Other experimental studies show a discrepancy under high pressure: diamond anvil (static) studies at core pressures yield melting temperatures that are approximately 2000 K below those from shock laser (dynamic) studies. The laser studies create plasma, and the results are suggestive that constraining inner core conditions will depend on whether the inner core is a solid or is a plasma with the density of a solid. This is an area of active research.

In early stages of Earth's formation about 4.6 billion years ago, melting would have caused denser substances to sink toward the center in a process called planetary differentiation (see also the iron catastrophe), while less-dense materials would have migrated to the crust. The core is thus believed to largely be composed of iron (80%), along with nickel and one or more light elements, whereas other dense elements, such as lead and uranium, either are too rare to be significant or tend to bind to lighter elements and thus remain in the crust (see felsic materials). Some have argued that the inner core may be in the form of a single iron crystal.

Under laboratory conditions a sample of iron–nickel alloy was subjected to the core-like pressure by gripping it in a vise between 2 diamond tips (diamond anvil cell), and then heating to approximately 4000 K. The sample was observed with x-rays, and strongly supported the theory that Earth's inner core was made of giant crystals running north to south.

The composition of Earth bears strong similarities to that of certain chondrite meteorites, and even to some elements in the outer portion of the Sun. Beginning as early as 1940, scientists, including Francis Birch, built geophysics upon the premise that Earth is like ordinary chondrites, the most common type of meteorite observed impacting Earth. This ignores the less abundant enstatite chondrites, which formed under extremely limited available oxygen, leading to certain normally oxyphile elements existing either partially or wholly in the alloy portion that corresponds to the core of Earth.

Dynamo theory suggests that convection in the outer core, combined with the Coriolis effect, gives rise to Earth's magnetic field. The solid inner core is too hot to hold a permanent magnetic field (see Curie temperature) but probably acts to stabilize the magnetic field generated by the liquid outer core. The average magnetic field in Earth's outer core is estimated to measure 2.5 milliteslas (25 gauss), 50 times stronger than the magnetic field at the surface.

The magnetic field generated by core flow is essential to protect life from interplanetary radiation and prevent the atmosphere from dissipating in the solar wind. The rate of cooling by conduction and convection is uncertain, but one estimate is that the core would not be expected to freeze up for approximately 91 billion years, which is well after the Sun is expected to expand, sterilize the surface of the planet, and then burn out.

== Seismology ==
The layering of Earth has been inferred indirectly using the time of travel of refracted and reflected seismic waves created by earthquakes. The core does not allow shear waves to pass through it, while the speed of travel (seismic velocity) is different in other layers. The changes in seismic velocity between different layers causes refraction owing to Snell's law, like light bending as it passes through a prism. Likewise, reflections are caused by a large increase in seismic velocity and are similar to light reflecting from a mirror.

== See also ==
- Hollow Earth
- Geological history of Earth
- Large low-shear-velocity provinces
- Lehmann discontinuity
- Rain-out model
- Seismic tomography – technique for imaging the subsurface of Earth using seismic waves
- Travel to the Earth's center
- Solid earth
