= Mantle (geology) =

Layer inside a planetary-mass object

A mantle is a layer inside a planetary body bounded below by a core and above by a crust. Mantles are made of rock or ices, and are generally the largest and most massive layer of the planetary body. Mantles are characteristic of planetary bodies that have undergone differentiation by density. All terrestrial planets (including Earth), half of the giant planets, specifically ice giants, a number of asteroids, and some planetary moons have mantles.

== Examples ==
=== Earth ===
The internal structure of Earth

The Earth's mantle is a layer of silicate rock between the crust and the outer core. Its mass of 4.01 × 10^{24} kg is 67% of the mass of the Earth. It has a thickness of 2,900 kilometres (1,800 mi) making up about 84% of Earth's volume. It is predominantly solid, but in geological time it behaves as a viscous fluid. Partial melting of the mantle at mid-ocean ridges produces oceanic crust, and partial melting of the mantle at subduction zones produces continental crust.

=== Other planets ===
Mercury has a silicate mantle approximately 490 kilometers (300 miles) thick, constituting only 28% of its mass. Venus's silicate mantle is approximately 2,800 kilometers (1,700 miles) thick, constituting around 70% of its mass. Mars's silicate mantle is approximately 1,600 kilometers (990 miles) thick, constituting ~74–88% of its mass, and may be represented by chassignite meteorites. Uranus and Neptune's ice mantles are approximately 30,000 km thick, composing 80% of both masses.

=== Moons ===
Jupiter's moons Io, Europa, and Ganymede have silicate mantles; Io's ~1,100 kilometers (680 miles) silicate mantle is overlain by a volcanic crust, Ganymede's ~1,315 kilometers (817 miles) thick silicate mantle is overlain by ~835 kilometers (519 miles) of ice, and Europa's ~1,165 kilometers (724 miles) km silicate mantle is overlain by ~85 kilometers (53 miles) of ice and possibly liquid water.

The silicate mantle of the Earth's moon is approximately 1300–1400 km thick, and is the source of mare basalts. The lunar mantle might be exposed in the South Pole-Aitken basin or the Crisium basin. The lunar mantle contains a seismic discontinuity at ~500 kilometers (310 miles) depth, most likely related to a change in composition.

Titan and Triton each have a mantle made of ice or other solid volatile substances.

=== Asteroids ===
Some of the largest asteroids have mantles; for example, Vesta has a silicate mantle similar in composition to diogenite meteorites.

== See also ==
- Earth's internal heat budget
- Lehmann discontinuity
- Mantle xenoliths
- Mantle convection
- Mesosphere (mantle)
- Numerical modeling (geology)
- Primitive mantle
