= Goldschmidt classification =

Geochemical classification

The Goldschmidt classification, developed by Victor Goldschmidt (1888–1947), is a geochemical classification which groups the chemical elements within the Earth according to their preferred host phases into lithophile (rock-loving), siderophile (iron-loving), chalcophile (sulfide ore-loving or chalcogen-loving), and atmophile (gas-loving) or volatile (the element, or a compound in which it occurs, is liquid or gaseous at ambient surface conditions).

Some elements have affinities to more than one phase. The main affinity is given in the table below and a discussion of each group follows that table.

Goldschmidt classification in the periodic table

| | 1 | 2 | | 3 | 4 | 5 | 6 | 7 | 8 | 9 | 10 | 11 | 12 | 13 | 14 | 15 | 16 | 17 | 18 |
Group →
↓ Period
| 1 | 1 H | | | | | | | | | | | | | | | | | | 2 He |
| 2 | 3 Li | 4 Be | | | | | | | | | | | | 5 B | 6 C | 7 N | 8 O | 9 F | 10; Ne |
| 3 | 11; Na | 12; Mg | | | | | | | | | | | | 13; Al | 14; Si | 15; P | 16; S | 17; Cl | 18; Ar |
| 4 | 19; K | 20; Ca | | 21; Sc | 22; Ti | 23; V | 24; Cr | 25; Mn | 26; Fe | 27; Co | 28; Ni | 29; Cu | 30; Zn | 31; Ga | 32; Ge | 33; As | 34; Se | 35; Br | 36; Kr |
| 5 | 37; Rb | 38; Sr | | 39; Y | 40; Zr | 41; Nb | 42; Mo | 43; Tc | 44; Ru | 45; Rh | 46; Pd | 47; Ag | 48; Cd | 49; In | 50; Sn | 51; Sb | 52; Te | 53; I | 54; Xe |
| 6 | 55; Cs | 56; Ba | 1 asterisk | 71; Lu | 72; Hf | 73; Ta | 74; W | 75; Re | 76; Os | 77; Ir | 78; Pt | 79; Au | 80; Hg | 81; Tl | 82; Pb | 83; Bi | 84; Po | 85; At | 86; Rn |
| 7 | 87; Fr | 88; Ra | 1 asterisk | 103; Lr | 104; Rf | 105; Db | 106; Sg | 107; Bh | 108; Hs | 109; Mt | 110; Ds | 111; Rg | 112; Cn | 113; Nh | 114; Fl | 115; Mc | 116; Lv | 117; Ts | 118; Og |
| 1 asterisk | | | | 57; La | 58; Ce | 59; Pr | 60; Nd | 61; Pm | 62; Sm | 63; Eu | 64; Gd | 65; Tb | 66; Dy | 67; Ho | 68; Er | 69; Tm | 70; Yb |
| 1 asterisk | | | | 89; Ac | 90; Th | 91; Pa | 92; U | 93; Np | 94; Pu | 95; Am | 96; Cm | 97; Bk | 98; Cf | 99; Es | 100; Fm | 101; Md | 102; No |

Goldschmidt classification: Lithophile Siderophile Chalcophile Atmophile Trace/Synthetic

== Lithophile elements ==
Lithophile elements (from Ancient Greek λῐ́θος (líthos) 'stone' and φίλος (phílos) 'dear, beloved') are those that remain on or close to the surface because they combine readily with oxygen, forming compounds that did not sink into the Earth's core. The lithophile elements include Al, B, Ba, Be, Br, Ca, Cl, Cr, Cs, F, I, Hf, K, Li, Mg, Na, Nb, O, P, Rb, Sc, Si, Sr, Ta, Th, Ti, U, V, W, Y, Zr, and the lanthanides or rare earth elements (REE).

Lithophile elements mainly consist of the highly reactive metals of the s- and f-blocks. They also include a small number of reactive nonmetals, and the more reactive metals of the d-block such as titanium, zirconium and vanadium.

Most lithophile elements form very stable ions with an electron configuration of a noble gas (sometimes with additional f-electrons). The few that do not, such as silicon, phosphorus and boron, form strong covalent bonds with oxygen, often involving pi bonding. Their strong affinity for oxygen causes lithophile elements to associate very strongly with silica, forming relatively low-density minerals that thus rose towards the crust during planetary differentiation. The more soluble minerals formed by the alkali metals tend to concentrate in seawater or arid regions where they can crystallise. The less soluble lithophile elements are concentrated on ancient continental shields where soluble minerals have been weathered.

Because of their strong affinity for oxygen, most lithophile elements are enriched in the Earth's crust relative to their abundance in the Solar System. The most reactive s- and f-block metals, which form either saline or metallic hydrides, are known to be extraordinarily enriched on Earth as a whole relative to their solar abundances. This is because during the earliest stages of the Earth's formation, the abundance of stable forms of each element was determined by how readily it forms volatile hydrides; these volatiles then could "escape" the proto-Earth, leaving behind those elements unreactive with hydrogen. Under these conditions, the s- and f-block metals were strongly enriched during the formation of the Earth. The most enriched elements are rubidium, strontium and barium, which between them account for over 50 percent by mass of all elements heavier than iron in the Earth's crust.

The nonmetallic lithophiles – phosphorus and the halogens – exist on Earth as ionic salts with s-block metals in pegmatites and seawater. With the exception of fluorine, whose hydride forms hydrogen bonds and is therefore of relatively low volatility, these elements have had their concentrations on Earth significantly reduced through escape of volatile hydrides during the Earth's formation. Although they are present in the Earth's crust in concentrations quite close to their solar abundances, phosphorus and the heavier halogens are probably significantly depleted on Earth as a whole relative to their solar abundances.

Several transition metals, including chromium, molybdenum, iron and manganese, show both lithophile and siderophile characteristics and can be found in both these two layers. Although these metals form strong bonds with oxygen and are never found in the Earth's crust in the free state, metallic forms of these elements are thought very likely to exist in the core of the earth as relics from when the atmosphere did not contain oxygen. Like the "pure" siderophiles, these elements (except iron) are considerably depleted in the crust relative to their solar abundances.

Owing to their strong affinity for oxygen, lithophile metals, although they form the great bulk of the metallic elements in Earth's crust, were never available as free metals before the development of electrolysis. With this development, many lithophile metals are of considerable value as structural metals (magnesium, aluminium, titanium, vanadium) or as reducing agents (sodium, magnesium, calcium).

The non-metals phosphorus and the halogens were also not known to early chemists, though production of these elements is less difficult than of metallic lithophiles since electrolysis is required only with fluorine. Elemental chlorine is particularly important as an oxidizing agent – usually being made by electrolysis of sodium chloride.

== Siderophile elements ==
Abundance (atom fraction) of the chemical elements in Earth's upper continental crust as a function of atomic number. The rarest elements in the crust (shown in yellow) are not the heaviest, but are rather the siderophile (iron-loving) elements in the Goldschmidt classification of elements. These have been depleted by being relocated into the Earth's core. Their abundance in meteoroid materials is relatively higher. Additionally, tellurium and selenium have been depleted from the crust due to formation of volatile hydrides.

Siderophile elements (from Ancient Greek σίδηρος (sídēros) 'iron') are the transition metals which tend to sink towards the core during planetary differentiation, because they dissolve readily in iron either as solid solutions or in the molten state. Some sources include elements which are not transition metals in their list of siderophiles, such as germanium. Other sources may also differ in their list based on the temperature being discussed – niobium, vanadium, chromium, and manganese may be considered siderophiles or not, depending on the assumed temperature and pressure. Also confusing the issue is that some elements, such as the aforementioned manganese, as well as molybdenum, form strong bonds with oxygen, but in the free state (as they existed on the early Earth when free oxygen did not exist) can mix so easily with iron that they do not concentrate in the siliceous crust, as do true lithophile elements. Iron, meanwhile, is simply everywhere.

The siderophile elements include the highly siderophilic ruthenium, rhodium, palladium, rhenium, osmium, iridium, platinum, and gold, the moderately siderophilic cobalt and nickel, in addition to the "disputed" elements mentioned earlier – some sources even include tungsten and silver.

Most siderophile elements have practically no affinity for oxygen: indeed, oxides of gold are thermodynamically unstable. They form stronger bonds with carbon or sulfur, but even these are not strong enough to separate out with the chalcophile elements. Thus, siderophile elements are bound with iron through metallic bonding in the Earth's core, where pressures may be high enough to keep the iron solid. Manganese, iron, and molybdenum do form strong bonds with oxygen, but in the free state (as on the early Earth) can mix so easily with iron that they do not concentrate in the siliceous crust, as do true lithophile elements. However, ores of manganese are found in much the same sites as are those of aluminium and titanium, owing to manganese's great reactivity towards oxygen.

Because they are so concentrated in the dense core, siderophile elements are known for their rarity in the Earth's crust. Most of them have always been known as precious metals because of this. Iridium is the rarest transition metal occurring within the Earth's crust, with an abundance by mass of less than one part per billion. Mineable deposits of precious metals usually form as a result of the erosion of ultramafic rocks, but are not highly concentrated even compared to their crustal abundances, which are typically several orders of magnitude below their solar abundances. However, because they are concentrated in the Earth's mantle and Earth's core, siderophile elements are believed to be present in the Earth as a whole (including the core) in something approaching their solar abundances.

== Chalcophile elements ==
The chalcophile elements (from Ancient Greek χαλκός (khalkós) 'copper, brass, bronze', also 'ore') include Ag, As, Bi, Cd, Cu, Ga, Ge, Hg, In, Pb, S, Sb, Se, Sn, Te, Tl and Zn.

Chalcophile elements are those that remain on or close to the surface because they combine readily with sulfur and some other chalcogens other than oxygen, forming compounds which did not sink along with iron towards the Earth's core. Chalcophile elements are those metals and heavier nonmetals that have a low affinity for oxygen and prefer to bond with sulfur as highly insoluble sulfides.

Because these sulfides are much denser than the silicate minerals formed by lithophile elements, chalcophile elements separated below the lithophiles at the time of the first crystallization of the Earth's crust. This has led to their depletion in the Earth's crust relative to their solar abundances, though because the minerals they form are nonmetallic, this depletion has not reached the levels found with siderophile elements.

However, because they formed volatile hydrides in the accreting protosolar nebula when the controlling redox reaction was the oxidation or reduction of hydrogen, the less metallic chalcophile elements are strongly depleted on Earth as a whole relative to cosmic abundances. This is most especially true of the chalcogens selenium and tellurium (which formed volatile hydrogen selenide and hydrogen telluride, respectively), which for this reason are among the rarest elements found in the Earth's crust (to illustrate, tellurium is only about as abundant as platinum).

The most metallic chalcophile elements (of the copper, zinc and boron groups) may mix to some degree with iron in the Earth's core. They are not likely to be depleted on Earth as a whole relative to their solar abundances since they do not form volatile hydrides. Zinc and gallium are somewhat "lithophile" in nature because they often occur in silicate or related minerals and form quite strong bonds with oxygen. Gallium, notably, is sourced mainly from bauxite, an aluminum hydroxide ore in which gallium ions substitute for chemically similar aluminum.

Although no chalcophile element is of high abundance in the Earth's crust, chalcophile elements constitute the bulk of commercially important metals. This is because, whereas lithophile elements require energy-intensive electrolysis for extraction, chalcophiles can be easily extracted by reduction, and chalcophiles' geochemical concentration – which in extreme cases can exceed 100,000 times their average crustal abundance. These greatest enrichments occur in high plateaus like the Tibetan Plateau and the Bolivian Altiplano where large quantities of chalcophile elements have been uplifted through plate tectonics. A side-effect of this in modern times is that the rarest chalcophiles (like mercury) are so completely exploited that their value as minerals has almost completely disappeared.

== Atmophile elements ==
The atmophile elements (from Ancient Greek ἀτμός (atmós) 'vapor, steam, smoke') are H, C, N and the noble gases.

Atmophile elements (also called "volatile elements") are defined as those that remain mostly on or above Earth's surface because they are, or occur in, liquids and/or gases at temperatures and pressures found on the surface. The noble gases do not form stable compounds and occur as monatomic gases, while nitrogen, although highly reactive as the free atom, bonds so strongly into diatomic molecular nitrogen that all oxides of nitrogen are thermodynamically unstable with respect to nitrogen and oxygen. Consequently, with the development of free oxygen in Earth's atmosphere, ammonia was oxidised to molecular nitrogen which has come to form four-fifths of the Earth's atmosphere. Carbon is also classed as an atmophile because it forms very strong multiple bonds with oxygen in carbon monoxide (slowly oxidised in the atmosphere) and carbon dioxide. The latter is the fourth-largest constituent of the Earth's atmosphere, while carbon monoxide occurs naturally from various sources (volcanoes, combustion) and has a residence time in the atmosphere of a few months.

Hydrogen, which occurs in water, is also classed as an atmophile. Water is classified as a volatile, because most of it is liquid or gas, even though it can exist as a solid compound at Earth's surface. Water can also be incorporated into other minerals as water of crystallization (as in gypsum) or through ionic and hydrogen bonding (as in talc), giving hydrogen some lithophile character.

Because all atmophile elements are either gases or form volatile hydrides, atmophile elements are strongly depleted on Earth as a whole relative to their solar abundances owing to losses from the atmosphere during the formation of the Earth. The heavier noble gases (krypton, xenon) are the rarest stable elements on Earth. (In fact they, along with neon, were all first isolated and described by William Ramsay and Morris Travers and assistants, who gave them names with Ancient Greek derivations of 'hidden', 'stranger', and 'new', respectively.)

Argon is the exception among the noble gases: it is the third-most abundant component of Earth's present-day atmosphere after nitrogen and oxygen, comprising approx. 1%. Argon-40 is a stable daughter of radioactive potassium-40, and argon is heavy enough to be gravitationally captured by the post-accretion Earth, so while the proto-Earth's primordial argon was mostly driven off, this radiogenic argon has accumulated over geologic time. This makes Earth's argon abundance substantially different from cosmic abundance ratios for argon, being enormously enriched in ^{40}Ar, while ^{36}Ar predominates cosmically.

== Trace and synthetic elements ==
Synthetic elements are excluded from the classification, as they do not occur naturally.

Trace radioactive elements (namely Tc, Pm, Po, At, Rn, Fr, Ra, Ac, Pa, Np, Pu) are also treated as synthetic. Although these do occur in nature, their occurrence is dependent on their long-lived parents Th and U, and they are not very mobile. For instance, polonium's chemistry would predict it to be a chalcophile, but it tends to occur instead as a lithophile along with its parent uranium. Even radon, a gas at standard conditions, does not usually have time to travel very far from the original uranium source before decaying. When needed, these elements are typically produced synthetically in nuclear reactors instead of extraction from ores.

== See also ==
- Abundance of the chemical elements
- Victor Goldschmidt
- Goldschmidt tolerance factor
