= Seismic wave =

Vibrational energy transfer in Earth or other planetary body

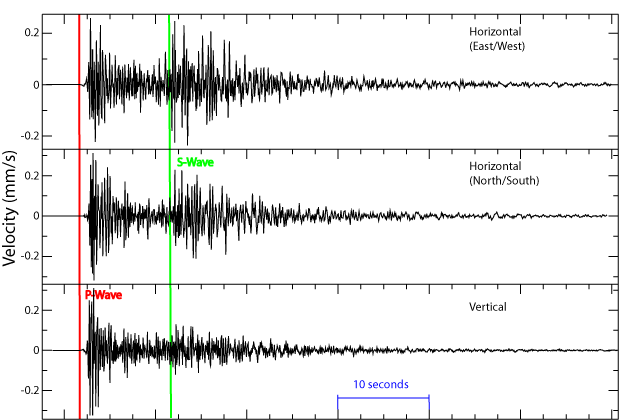
P wave and S wave from seismograph

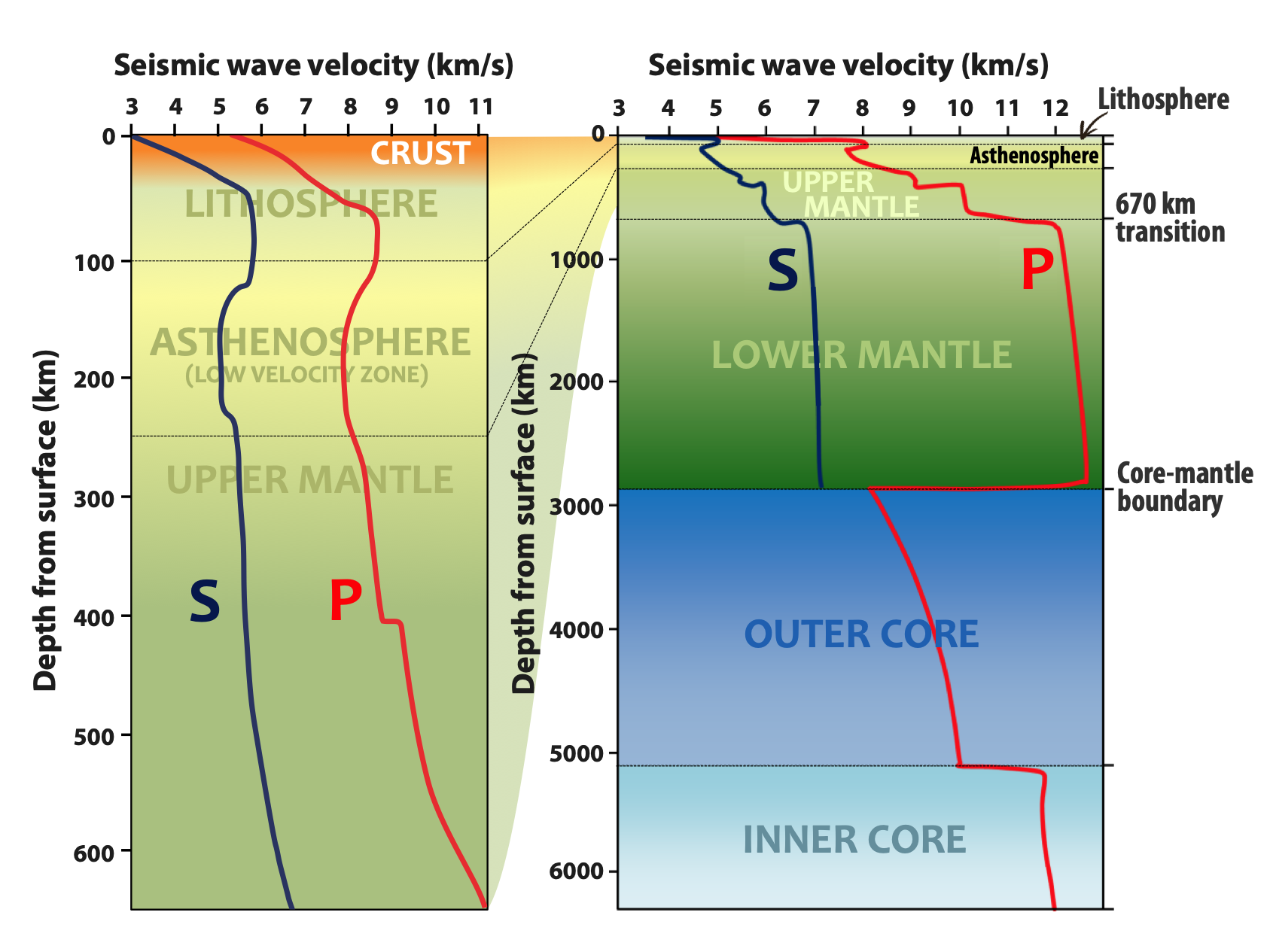
Velocity of seismic waves in Earth versus depth. The negligible S-wave velocity in the outer core occurs because it is liquid, while in the solid inner core the S-wave velocity is non-zero

A seismic wave is a mechanical wave of acoustic energy that travels through the Earth or another planetary body. It can result from an earthquake (or generally, a quake), volcanic eruption, magma movement, a large landslide, and a large man-made explosion that produces low-frequency acoustic energy. Seismic waves are studied by seismologists, who record the waves using seismometers, hydrophones (in water), or accelerometers. Seismic waves are distinguished from seismic noise (ambient vibration), which is persistent low-amplitude vibration arising from a variety of natural and anthropogenic sources.

The propagation velocity of a seismic wave depends on the density and elasticity of the medium as well as the type of wave. Velocity tends to increase with depth through Earth's crust and mantle, but drops sharply going from the mantle to Earth's outer core.

Earthquakes create distinct types of waves with different velocities. When recorded by a seismic observatory, their different travel times help scientists locate the quake's hypocenter. In geophysics, the refraction or reflection of seismic waves is used for research into Earth's internal structure. Scientists sometimes generate and measure vibrations to investigate shallow, subsurface structure.

== Types ==
Among the many types of seismic waves, one can make a broad distinction between body waves, which travel through the Earth, and surface waves, which travel at the Earth's surface.

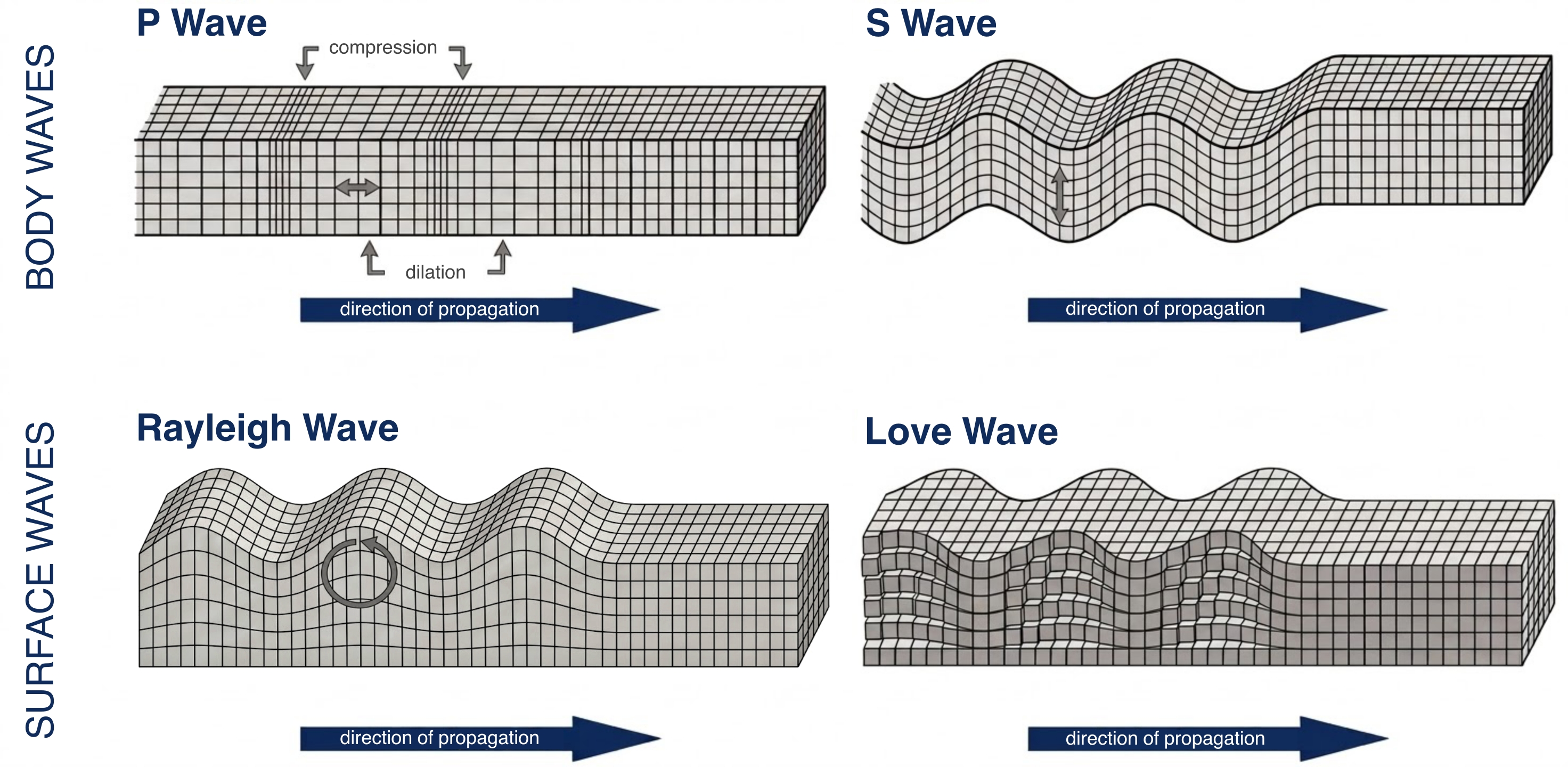
Body waves and surface waves

Other modes of wave propagation exist than those described in this article; though of comparatively minor importance for earth-borne waves, they are important in the case of asteroseismology.

- Body waves travel through the interior of the Earth.
- Surface waves travel across the surface. Surface waves decay more slowly with distance than body waves which travel in three dimensions.
- Particle motion of surface waves is larger than that of body waves, so surface waves tend to cause more damage.

=== Body waves ===
Body waves travel through the interior of the Earth along paths controlled by the material properties in terms of density and modulus (stiffness). The density and modulus, in turn, vary according to temperature, composition, and material phase. This effect resembles the refraction of light waves. Two types of particle motion result in two types of body waves: Primary and Secondary waves. This distinction was recognized in 1830 by the French mathematician Siméon Denis Poisson.

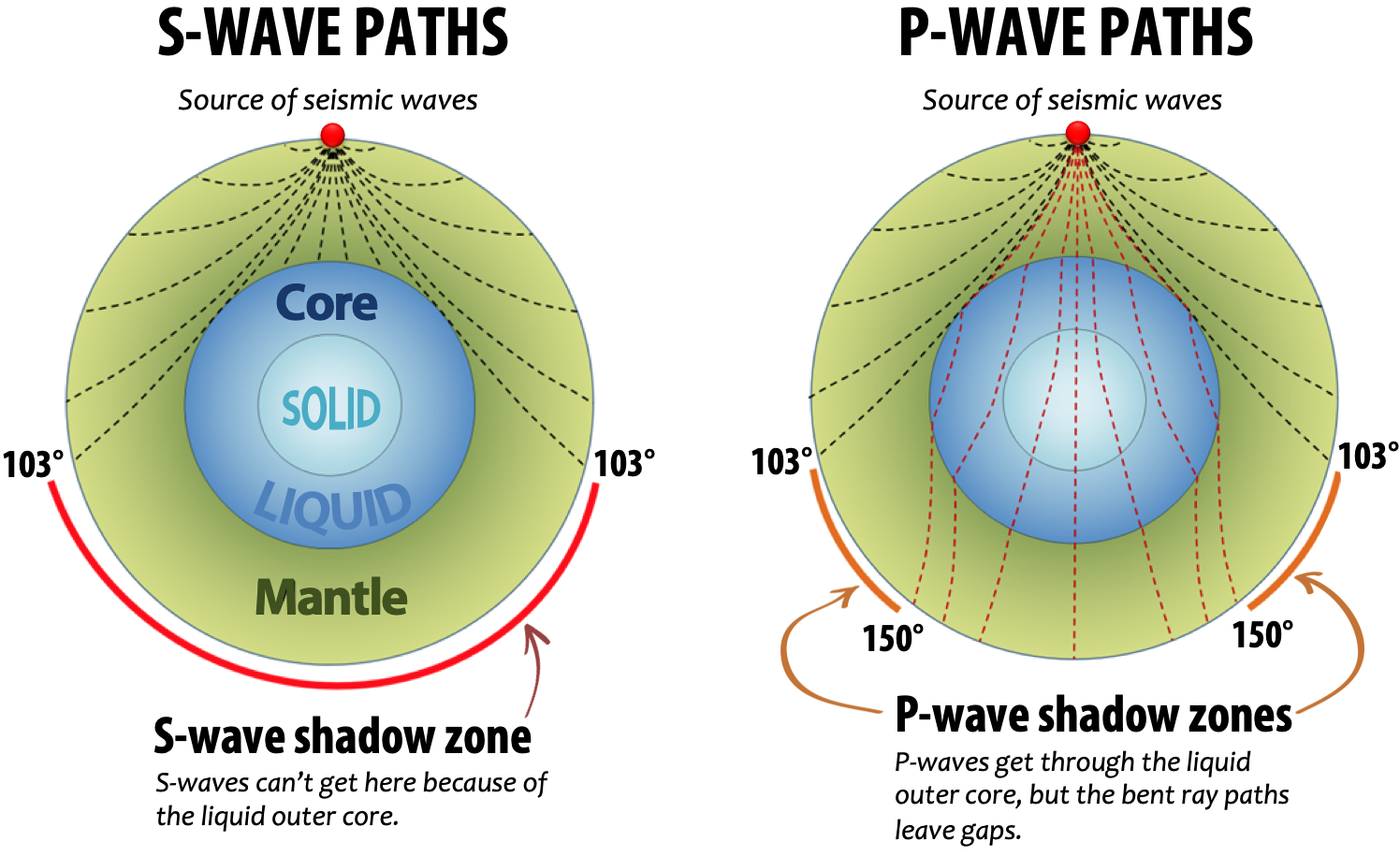
Patterns of seismic wave travel through Earth's mantle and core. S waves can not travel through the liquid outer core, so they leave a shadow on Earth's far side. P waves do travel through the core, but P wave refraction bends seismic waves away from P wave shadow zones.

==== Primary waves ====
Primary waves (P waves) are compressional waves that are longitudinal in nature. P waves are pressure waves that travel faster than other waves through the earth to arrive at seismograph stations first, hence the name "Primary". These waves can travel through any type of material, including fluids, and can travel nearly 1.7 times faster than the S waves. In air, they take the form of sound waves, hence they travel at the speed of sound. Typical speeds are 330 m/s in air, 1450 m/s in water and about 5000 m/s in granite.

==== Secondary waves ====
Secondary waves (S waves) are shear waves that are transverse in nature. Following an earthquake event, S waves arrive at seismograph stations after the faster-moving P waves and displace the ground perpendicular to the direction of propagation. Depending on the propagational direction, the wave can take on different surface characteristics; for example, in the case of horizontally polarized S waves, the ground moves alternately to one side and then the other. S waves can travel only through solids, as fluids (liquids and gases) do not support shear stresses. S waves are slower than P waves, and speeds are typically around 60% of that of P waves in any given material. Shear waves can not travel through any liquid medium, so the absence of S waves in earth's outer core suggests a liquid state.

=== Surface waves ===
Seismic surface waves travel along the Earth's surface. They can be classified as a form of mechanical surface wave. Surface waves diminish in amplitude as they get farther from the surface and propagate more slowly than seismic body waves (P and S). Surface waves from very large earthquakes can have globally observable amplitude of several centimeters.

==== Rayleigh waves ====
Rayleigh waves, also called ground roll, are surface waves that propagate with motions that are similar to those of waves on the surface of water (note, however, that the associated seismic particle motion at shallow depths is typically retrograde, and that the restoring force in Rayleigh and in other seismic waves is elastic, not gravitational as for water waves). The existence of these waves was predicted by John William Strutt, Lord Rayleigh, in 1885. They are slower than body waves, e.g., at roughly 90% of the velocity of S waves for typical homogeneous elastic media. In a layered medium (e.g., the crust and upper mantle) the velocity of the Rayleigh waves depends on their frequency and wavelength. See also Lamb waves.

==== Love waves ====
Love waves are horizontally polarized shear waves (SH waves), existing only in the presence of a layered medium. They are named after Augustus Edward Hough Love, a British mathematician who created a mathematical model of the waves in 1911. They usually travel slightly faster than Rayleigh waves, about 90% of the S wave velocity.

==== Stoneley waves ====
A Stoneley wave is a type of boundary wave (or interface wave) that propagates along a solid-fluid boundary or, under specific conditions, also along a solid-solid boundary. Amplitudes of Stoneley waves have their maximum values at the boundary between the two contacting media and decay exponentially away from the contact. These waves can also be generated along the walls of a fluid-filled borehole, being an important source of coherent noise in vertical seismic profiles (VSP) and making up the low frequency component of the source in sonic logging. The equation for Stoneley waves was first given by Dr. Robert Stoneley (1894–1976), emeritus professor of seismology, Cambridge.

==== Normal modes ====
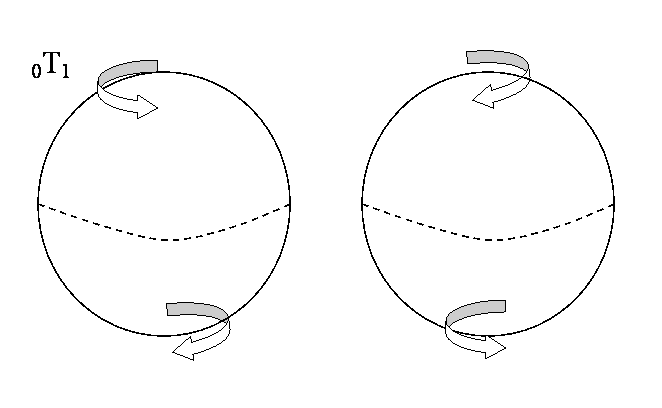
The sense of motion for toroidal _{0}T_{1} oscillation for two moments of time.

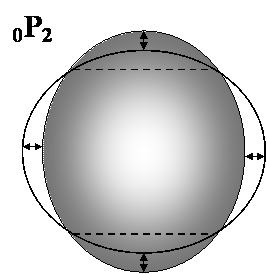
The scheme of motion for spheroidal _{0}S_{2} oscillation. Dashed lines give nodal (zero) lines. Arrows give the sense of motion.

Free oscillations of the Earth are standing waves, the result of interference between two surface waves traveling in opposite directions. Interference of Rayleigh waves results in spheroidal oscillation S while interference of Love waves gives toroidal oscillation T. The modes of oscillations are specified by three numbers, e.g., _{n}S_{l}^{m}, where l is the angular order number (or spherical harmonic degree, see Spherical harmonics for more details). The number m is the azimuthal order number. It may take on 2l+1 values from −l to +l. The number n is the radial order number. It means the wave with n zero crossings in radius. For spherically symmetric Earth the period for given n and l does not depend on m.

Some examples of spheroidal oscillations are the "breathing" mode _{0}S_{0}, which involves an expansion and contraction of the whole Earth, and has a period of about 20 minutes; and the "rugby" mode _{0}S_{2}, which involves expansions along two alternating directions, and has a period of about 54 minutes. The mode _{0}S_{1} does not exist because it would require a change in the center of gravity, which would require an external force.

Of the fundamental toroidal modes, _{0}T_{1} represents changes in Earth's rotation rate; although this occurs, it is much too slow to be useful in seismology. The mode _{0}T_{2} describes a twisting of the northern and southern hemispheres relative to each other; it has a period of about 44 minutes.

The first observations of free oscillations of the Earth were done during the great 1960 earthquake in Chile. Presently the periods of thousands of modes have been observed. These data are used for constraining large scale structures of the Earth's interior.

=== P and S waves in Earth's mantle and core ===
When an earthquake occurs, seismographs near the epicenter are able to record both P and S waves, but those at a greater distance no longer detect the high frequencies of the first S wave. Since shear waves cannot pass through liquids, this phenomenon was original evidence for the now well-established observation that the Earth has a liquid outer core, as demonstrated by Richard Dixon Oldham. This kind of observation has also been used to argue, by seismic testing, that the Moon has a solid core, although recent geodetic studies suggest the core is still molten.

== Notation ==
Earthquake wave paths

The naming of seismic waves is usually based on the wave type and its path; due to the theoretically infinite possibilities of travel paths and the different areas of application, a wide variety of nomenclatures have emerged historically, the standardization of which – for example in the IASPEI Standard Seismic Phase List – is still an ongoing process. The path that a wave takes between the focus and the observation point is often drawn as a ray diagram. Each path is denoted by a set of letters that describe the trajectory and phase through the Earth. In general, an upper case denotes a transmitted wave and a lower case denotes a reflected wave.

g	a wave that only travels through the upper crust
b	a wave that only travels through the upper and lower crust
n	a wave that travels along the boundary between the crust and mantle
dif	a wave diffracted by the core-mantle boundary or the outer-inner core boundary
w	the wave reflects downwards off the bottom of the ocean
m	a wave reflects upwards or downwards off the Moho discontinuity
c	a wave reflects upwards off the core-mantle boundary
i	a wave reflects upwards off the inner core
	No letter is used when the wave reflects downwards off the surface, outer or inner core
z+	a wave reflects upwards off a discontinuity at depth z
z-	a wave reflects downwards off a discontinuity at depth z
P	a P wave in the mantle or crust
S	an S wave in the mantle or crust
K	a P wave in the outer core
I	a P wave in the inner core
J	an S wave in the inner core
p	a P wave ascending to the surface from the focus
s	an S wave ascending to the surface from the focus
L	any long period surface wave
LQ	a Love wave through the surface
RQ	a Rayleigh wave through the surface
G	a Love wave through the Moho discontinuity
R	a Rayleigh wave through the Moho discontinuity
H	a hydroacustic wave from a source in the water
I	an acoustic wave from a source in the atmosphere
T	a wave traveling through the ocean in the SOFAR channel

For example:

- ScP is a wave that begins traveling towards the center of the Earth as an S wave. Upon reaching the outer core the wave reflects as a P wave.
- sPKIKP is a wave path that begins traveling towards the surface as an S wave. At the surface, it reflects as a P wave. The P wave then travels through the outer core, the inner core, the outer core, and the mantle.

== Usefulness of P and S waves in locating an event ==
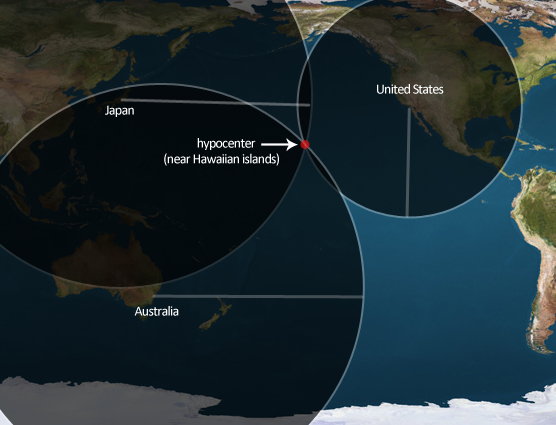
The hypocenter/epicenter of an earthquake is calculated by using the seismic data of that earthquake from at least three different locations. The hypocenter/epicenter is found at the intersection of three circles centered on three observation stations, here shown in Japan, Australia and the United States. The radius of each circle is calculated from the difference in the arrival times of P and S waves at the corresponding station.

In the case of local or nearby earthquakes, the difference in the arrival times of the P and S waves can be used to determine the distance to the event. In the case of earthquakes that have occurred at global distances, three or more geographically diverse observing stations (using a common clock) recording P wave arrivals permits the computation of a unique time and location on the planet for the event. Typically, dozens or even hundreds of P wave arrivals are used to calculate hypocenters. The misfit generated by a hypocenter calculation is known as "the residual". Residuals of 0.5 second or less are typical for distant events, residuals of 0.1–0.2 s typical for local events, meaning most reported P arrivals fit the computed hypocenter that well. Typically a location program will start by assuming the event occurred at a depth of about 33 km; then it minimizes the residual by adjusting depth. Most events occur at depths shallower than about 40 km, but some occur as deep as 700 km.

P and S waves separating with time

A quick way to determine the distance from a location to the origin of a seismic wave less than 200 km away is to take the difference in arrival time of the P wave and the S wave in seconds and multiply by 8 kilometers per second. Modern seismic arrays use more complicated earthquake location techniques.

At teleseismic distances, the first arriving P waves have necessarily travelled deep into the mantle, and perhaps have even refracted into the outer core of the planet, before travelling back up to the Earth's surface where the seismographic stations are located. The waves travel more quickly than if they had traveled in a straight line from the earthquake. This is due to the appreciably increased velocities within the planet, and is termed Huygens' Principle. Density in the planet increases with depth, which would slow the waves, but the modulus of the rock increases much more, so deeper means faster. Therefore, a longer route can take a shorter time.

The travel time must be calculated very accurately in order to compute a precise hypocenter. Since P waves move at many kilometers per second, being off on travel-time calculation by even a half second can mean an error of many kilometers in terms of distance. In practice, P arrivals from many stations are used and the errors cancel out, so the computed epicenter is likely to be quite accurate, on the order of 10–50 km or so around the world. Dense arrays of nearby sensors such as those that exist in California can provide accuracy of roughly a kilometer, and much greater accuracy is possible when timing is measured directly by cross-correlation of seismogram waveforms.

== See also ==
- Adams–Williamson equation
- Helioseismology
- Reflection seismology

== Sources ==
- Shearer, Peter M. (2009). Introduction to Seismology. Cambridge University Press. ISBN 978-0-521-88210-1.
