= Super-rotation =

Super-rotation can mean:

- Atmospheric super-rotation, in which a planet's atmosphere rotates faster than the planet's surface
- Inner core super-rotation, in which a planet's inner core rotates faster than the planet's surface
