= Geothermal gradient =

Rate of temperature increase with depth in Earth's interior

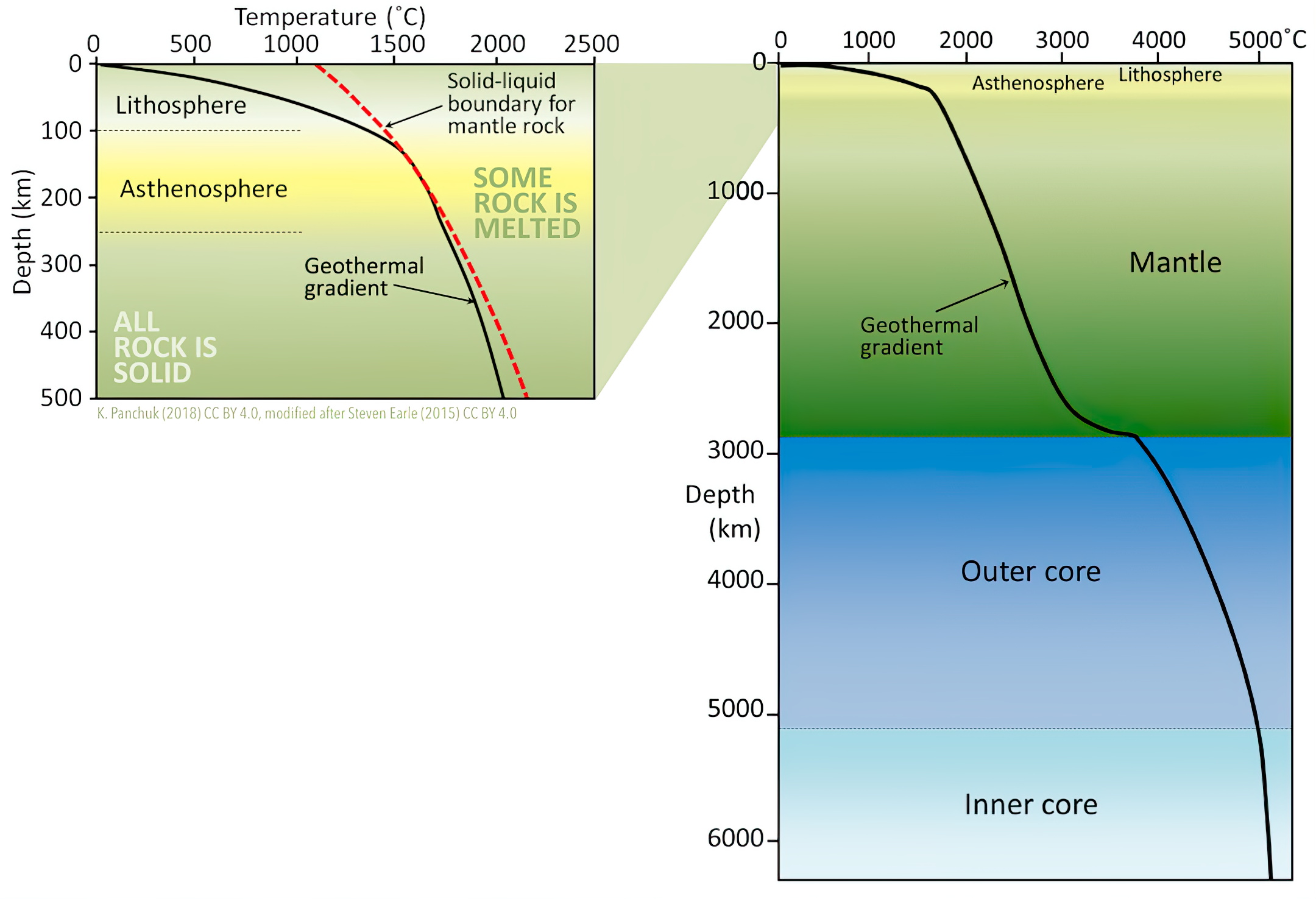
Temperature profile of inner Earth, schematic view (estimated). The red dashed line shows the minimum temperature for the respective mantle rock to melt. The geothermal gradient remains below the melting temperature of the rock, except in the asthenosphere. Sharp rises occur in the uppermost mantle and at the core–mantle boundary.

Geothermal gradient is the rate of change in temperature with respect to increasing depth in Earth's interior. As a general rule, the crust temperature rises with depth due to the heat flow from the much hotter mantle; away from tectonic plate boundaries, temperature rises with depth at a rate of about 25–30 °C/km (72–87 °F/mi) near the surface in the continental crust. However, in some cases the temperature may drop with increasing depth, especially near the surface, a phenomenon known as inverse or negative geothermal gradient. The effects of weather and climate are shallow, only reaching a depth of roughly 10–20 m (33–66 ft).

Strictly speaking, geo-thermal necessarily refers to Earth, but the concept may be applied to other planets. In SI units, the geothermal gradient is expressed in degree celsius per kilometre (°C/km), kelvin per kilometre (K/km), or millikelvin per metre (mK/m); these are all equivalent.

Earth's internal heat comes from a combination of residual heat from planetary accretion, heat produced through radioactive decay, latent heat from core crystallization, and possibly heat from other sources. The major heat-producing nuclides in Earth are potassium-40, uranium-238, uranium-235, and thorium-232. The inner core is thought to have temperatures in the range of 4000 to 7000 K, and the pressure at the centre of the planet is thought to be about 360 GPa (3.6 million atm). (The exact value depends on the density profile in Earth.) Because much of the heat is provided for by radioactive decay, scientists believe that early in Earth's history, before nuclides with short half-lives had been depleted, Earth's heat production would have been much higher. Heat production was twice that of present-day at approximately 3 billion years ago, resulting in larger temperature gradients within Earth, larger rates of mantle convection and plate tectonics, allowing the production of igneous rocks such as komatiites that are no longer formed.

The top of the geothermal gradient is influenced by atmospheric temperature. The uppermost layers of the solid planet are at the temperature produced by the local weather, decaying to approximately the mean annual ground temperature (MAGT) at a shallow depth of about 10–20 metres (33–66 ft) depending on the type of ground, rock etc.; it is this depth which is used for many ground-source heat pumps. The top hundreds of meters reflect past climate change; descending further, warmth increases steadily as interior heat sources begin to dominate.

== Heat sources ==
Earth cutaway from core to exosphere

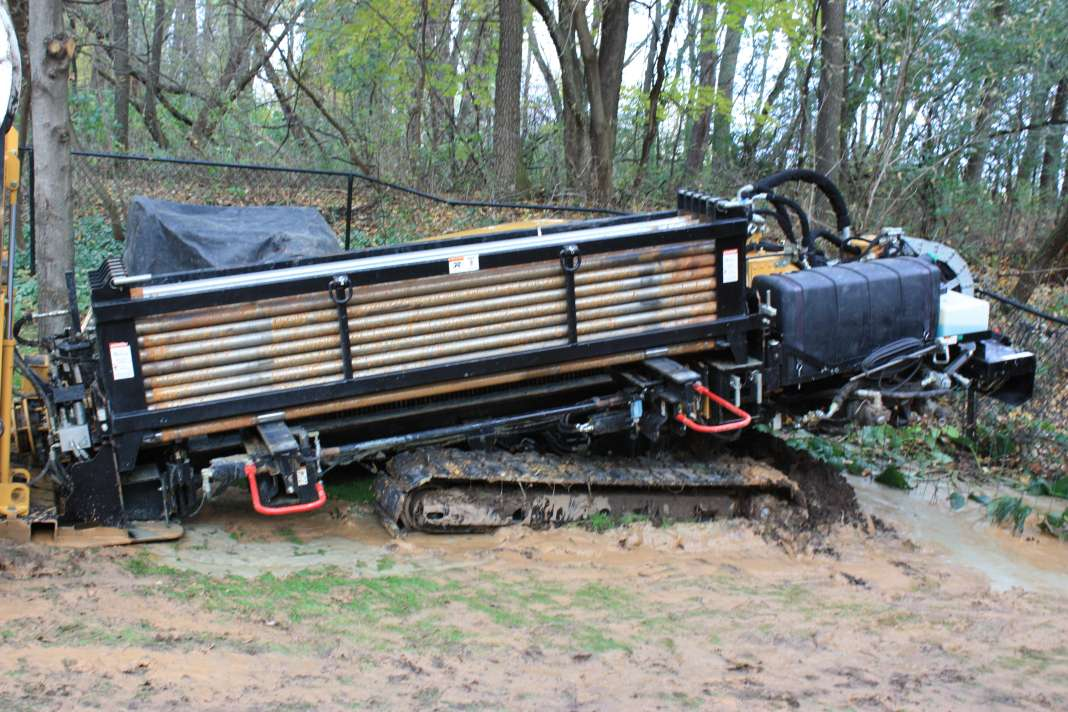
Geothermal drill machine in Wisconsin, US

Temperature within Earth increases with depth. Highly viscous or partially molten rock at temperatures between 650 and 1,200 °C (1,200 and 2,200 °F) are found at the margins of tectonic plates, increasing the geothermal gradient in the vicinity, but only the outer core is postulated to exist in a molten or fluid state, and the temperature at Earth's inner core/outer core boundary, around 5,150 kilometres (3,200 mi) deep, is estimated to be 5650 ± 600 Kelvin. The heat content of Earth is 10^{31} joules.

- Much of the heat is created by decay of naturally radioactive elements. An estimated 45 to 90 percent of the heat escaping from Earth originates from radioactive decay of elements, mainly located in the mantle.
- Gravitational potential energy, which can be further divided into:
  - Release during the accretion of Earth.
  - Heat released during differentiation, as abundant heavy metals (iron, nickel, copper) descended to Earth's core.
- Latent heat released as the liquid outer core crystallizes at the inner core boundary.
- Heat may be generated by tidal forces on Earth as it rotates (conservation of angular momentum). The resulting earth tides dissipate energy in Earth's interior as heat.

The radiogenic heat from the decay of ^{238}U and ^{232}Th are now the major contributors to Earth's internal heat budget.

In Earth's continental crust, the decay of natural radioactive nuclides makes a significant contribution to geothermal heat production. The continental crust is abundant in lower density minerals but also contains significant concentrations of heavier lithophilic elements such as uranium. Because of this, it holds the most concentrated global reservoir of radioactive elements found in Earth. Naturally occurring radioactive elements are enriched in the granite and basaltic rocks, especially in layers closer to Earth's surface. These high levels of radioactive elements are largely excluded from Earth's mantle due to their inability to substitute in mantle minerals and consequent enrichment in melts during mantle melting processes. The mantle is mostly made up of high density minerals with higher concentrations of elements that have relatively small atomic radii, such as magnesium (Mg), titanium (Ti), and calcium (Ca).

Present-day major heat-producing nuclides
Nuclide	Heat release [W/kg nuclide]	Half-life [years]	Mean mantle concentration [kg nuclide/kg mantle]	Heat release [W/kg mantle]
^{238}U	9.46 × 10^{−5}	4.47 × 10^{9}	30.8 × 10^{−9}	2.91 × 10^{−12}
^{235}U	56.9 × 10^{−5}	0.704 × 10^{9}	0.22 × 10^{−9}	0.125 × 10^{−12}
^{232}Th	2.64 × 10^{−5}	14.0 × 10^{9}	124 × 10^{−9}	3.27 × 10^{−12}
^{40}K	2.92 × 10^{−5}	1.25 × 10^{9}	36.9 × 10^{−9}	1.08 × 10^{−12}

The geothermal gradient is steeper in the lithosphere than in the mantle because the mantle transports heat primarily by convection, leading to a geothermal gradient that is determined by the mantle adiabat, rather than by the conductive heat transfer processes that predominate in the lithosphere, which acts as a thermal boundary layer of the convecting mantle.

== Heat flow ==
Heat flows constantly from its sources within Earth to the surface. Total heat loss from Earth is estimated at 44.2 TW (4.42 × 10^{13} Watts). Mean heat flow is 65 mW/m^{2} over continental crust and 101 mW/m^{2} over oceanic crust. This is 0.087 watt/square metre on average (0.03 percent of solar power absorbed by Earth), but is much more concentrated in areas where the lithosphere is thin, such as along mid-ocean ridges (where new oceanic lithosphere is created) and near mantle plumes. Earth's crust effectively acts as a thick insulating blanket which must be pierced by fluid conduits (of magma, water or other) in order to release the heat underneath. More of the heat in Earth is lost through plate tectonics, by mantle upwelling associated with mid-ocean ridges. Another major mode of heat loss is by conduction through the lithosphere, the majority of which occurs in the oceans due to the crust there being much thinner and younger than under the continents.

The heat of Earth is replenished by radioactive decay at a rate of 30 TW. The global geothermal flow rates are more than twice the rate of human energy consumption from all primary sources. Global data on heat-flow density are collected and compiled by the International Heat Flow Commission (IHFC) of the IASPEI/IUGG.

== Direct application ==
Heat from Earth's interior can be used as an energy source, known as geothermal energy. The geothermal gradient has been used for space heating and bathing since ancient Roman times, and more recently for generating electricity. As the human population continues to grow, so does energy use and the correlating environmental impacts that are consistent with global primary sources of energy. This has caused a growing interest in finding sources of energy that are renewable and have reduced greenhouse gas emissions. In areas of high geothermal energy density, current technology allows for the generation of electrical power because of the corresponding high temperatures. Generating electrical power from geothermal resources requires no fuel while providing true baseload energy at a reliability rate that constantly exceeds 90%. In order to extract geothermal energy, it is necessary to efficiently transfer heat from a geothermal reservoir to a power plant, where electrical energy is converted from heat by passing steam through a turbine connected to a generator. The efficiency of converting the geothermal heat into electricity depends on the temperature difference between the heated fluid (water or steam) and the environmental temperature, so it is advantageous to use deep, high-temperature heat sources. On a worldwide scale, the heat stored in Earth's interior provides an energy that is still seen as an exotic source. About 10 GW of geothermal electric capacity is installed around the world as of 2007, generating 0.3% of global electricity demand. An additional 28 GW of direct geothermal heating capacity is installed for district heating, space heating, spas, industrial processes, desalination and agricultural applications.

== Variations ==
The geothermal gradient varies with location and is typically measured by determining the bottom open-hole temperature after borehole drilling. Temperature logs obtained immediately after drilling are however affected due to drilling fluid circulation. To obtain accurate bottom hole temperature estimates, it is necessary for the well to reach stable temperature. This is not always achievable for practical reasons.

In stable tectonic areas in the tropics, a temperature-depth plot will converge to the annual average surface temperature. However, in areas where deep permafrost developed during the Pleistocene, a low temperature anomaly can be observed that persists down to several hundred metres. The Suwałki cold anomaly in Poland has led to the recognition that similar thermal disturbances related to Pleistocene–Holocene climatic changes are recorded in boreholes throughout Poland, as well as in Alaska, northern Canada, and Siberia.

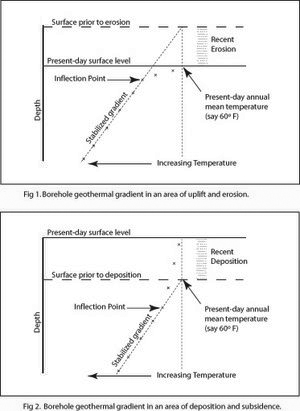

In areas of Holocene uplift and erosion (Fig. 1) the shallow gradient will be high until it reaches a point (labeled "Inflection point" in the figure) where it reaches the stabilized heat-flow regime. If the gradient of the stabilized regime is projected above this point to its intersection with present-day annual average temperature, the height of this intersection above present-day surface level gives a measure of the extent of Holocene uplift and erosion. In areas of Holocene subsidence and deposition (Fig. 2) the initial gradient will be lower than the average until it reaches a point where it joins the stabilized heat-flow regime.

Variations in surface temperature, whether daily, seasonal, or induced by climate changes and the Milankovitch cycle, penetrate below Earth's surface and produce an oscillation in the geothermal gradient with periods varying from a day to tens of thousands of years, and an amplitude which decreases with depth. The longest-period variations have a scale depth of several kilometers. Melt water from the polar ice caps flowing along ocean bottoms tends to maintain a constant geothermal gradient throughout Earth's surface.

If the rate of temperature increase with depth observed in shallow boreholes were to persist at greater depths, temperatures deep within Earth would soon reach the point where rocks would melt. We know, however, that Earth's mantle is solid because of the transmission of S-waves. The temperature gradient dramatically decreases with depth for two reasons. First, the mechanism of thermal transport changes from conduction, as within the rigid tectonic plates, to convection, in the portion of Earth's mantle that convects. Despite its solidity, most of Earth's mantle behaves over long time-scales as a fluid, and heat is transported by advection, or material transport. Second, radioactive heat production is concentrated within the crust of Earth, and particularly within the upper part of the crust, as concentrations of uranium, thorium, and potassium are highest there: these three elements are the main producers of radioactive heat within Earth. Thus, the geothermal gradient within the bulk of Earth's mantle is of the order of 0.5 kelvin per kilometer, and is determined by the adiabatic gradient associated with mantle material (peridotite in the upper mantle).

== Negative geothermal gradient ==
Negative geothermal gradients occur where temperature decreases with depth. This occurs in the upper few hundreds of meters near the surface. Because of the low thermal diffusivity of rocks, deep underground temperatures are hardly affected by diurnal or even annual surface temperature variations. At depths of a few meters, underground temperatures are therefore similar to the annual average surface temperature. At greater depths, underground temperatures reflect a long-term average over past climate, so that temperatures at the depths of dozens to hundreds of meters contain information about the climate of the last hundreds to thousands of years. Depending on the location, these may be colder than current temperatures due to the colder weather close to the last ice age, or due to more recent climate change.

Negative geothermal gradients may also occur due to deep aquifers, where heat transfer from deep water by convection and advection results in water at shallower levels heating adjacent rocks to a higher temperature than rocks at a somewhat deeper level.

Negative geothermal gradients are also found at large scales in subduction zones. A subduction zone is a tectonic plate boundary where oceanic crust sinks into the mantle due to the high density of the oceanic plate relative to the underlying mantle. Since the sinking plate enters the mantle at a rate of a few centimeters per year, heat conduction is unable to heat the plate as quickly as it sinks. Therefore, the sinking plate has a lower temperature than the surrounding mantle, resulting in a negative geothermal gradient.

== See also ==
- Temperature gradient
- Earth's internal heat budget
- Geothermal power
- Hydrothermal circulation
