= Inge Lehmann =

Danish seismologist (1888–1993)

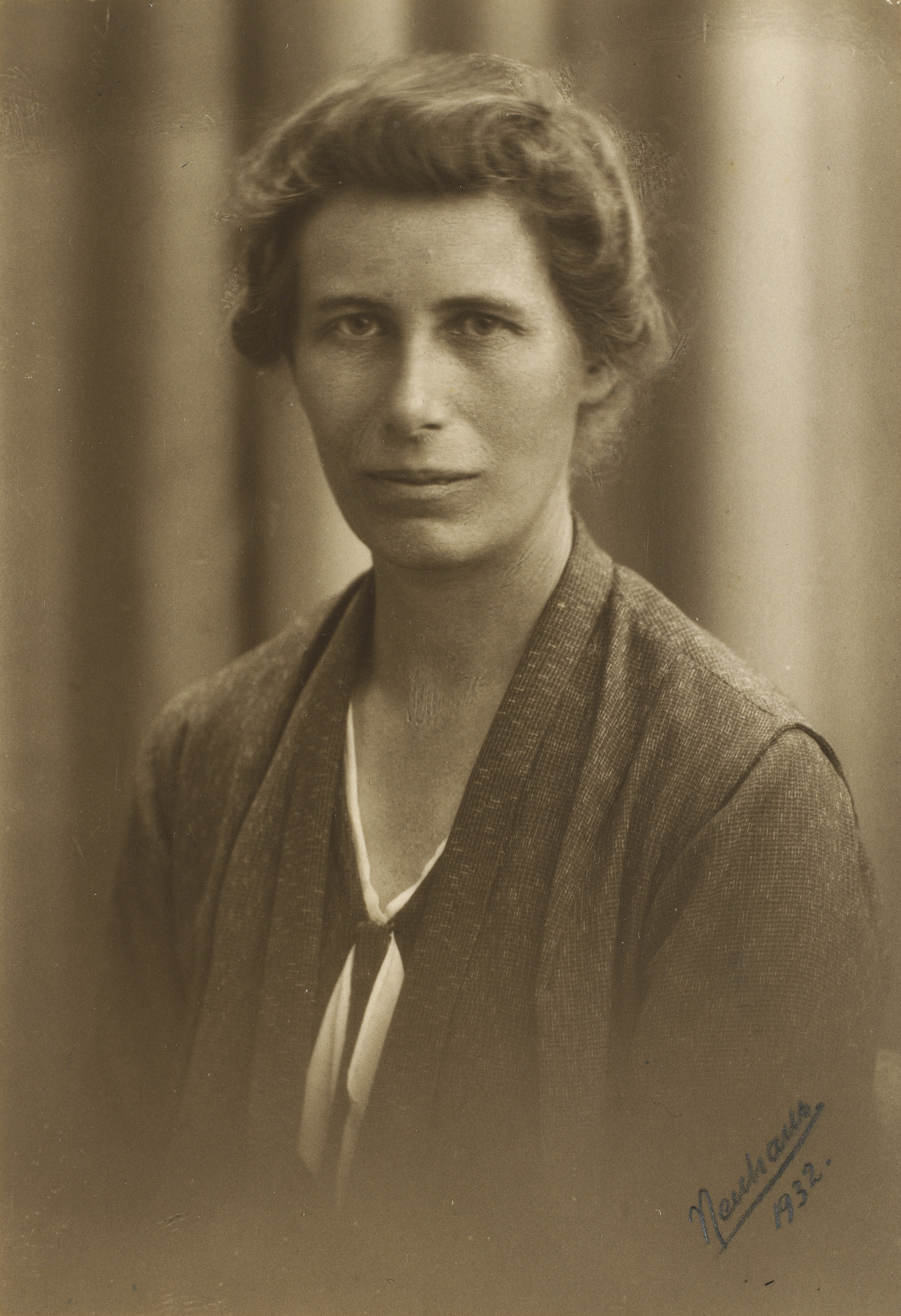
- Lehmann in 1932
- Born: 13 May 1888; Copenhagen, Denmark
- Died: 21 February 1993 (aged 104); Copenhagen, Denmark
- Resting place: Hørsholm Cemetery; 55°52′14.06″N 12°30′16.01″E
- Education: University of Copenhagen; University of Cambridge
- Known for: Discovering the Lehmann discontinuity (1936)
- Awards: William Bowie Medal (1971)
- Scientific career
- Fields: Seismology, geophysics
- Workplaces: Geodetical Institute of Denmark

Inge Lehmann (13 May 1888 – 21 February 1993) was a Danish seismologist and geophysicist who is known for her discovery in 1936 of the solid inner core that exists within the molten outer core of the Earth. She also discovered the seismic discontinuity in the speed of seismic waves at depths between 190 km (120 mi) and 250 km (160 mi), which is named the Lehmann discontinuity after her. Lehmann is considered to be a pioneer among women and scientists in seismology research.

== Early life, family and education ==
Inge Lehmann was born on 13 May 1888 and raised in Østerbro, a part of Copenhagen, Denmark. Her father was experimental psychologist Alfred Georg Ludvik Lehmann (1858–1921), a pioneer in the study of experimental psychology in Denmark. Her mother Ida Sophie Tørsleff was a housewife. The Lehmann family had its roots in Bohemia; the Danish branch included barristers, politicians and engineers. Inge Lehmann's paternal grandfather laid out the first Danish telegraph line (1854). Her great-grandfather was Governor of the National Bank. Her mother's father, Hans Jakob Torsleff, was from an old Danish family with a priest in every generation. Members of the Tørsleff family were well-known public leaders and activists in the women's rights movement. Inge's cousins were the Minister of Trade, the chair of the Danish Women's Society, and the leader of the Danish Girl Scouts. Her younger sister Signe, a single mother, rose to popularity as a school superintendent.

Lehmann's parents enrolled both their two daughters at Fællesskolen in 1904, a liberal and progressive school that offered the same curriculum to both boys and girls — a practice uncommon at the time. Most schools of this time separated boys' and girls' education. The principles of isolation by sex went much deeper for girls who were education-oriented. It was thought to be damaging to expose girls to mental exhaustion throughout puberty. Males were believed to be more biologically adapted for such activities and therefore, allowed to take the high school entrance exam and start upper-secondary education (high school) at 15 years old, whereas females were prohibited. This policy remained in effect until 1903.

This school was led by Hanna Adler, Niels Bohr's aunt, a pioneering woman scholar and firm believer in equality of the sexes. A year after earning her degree, Adler launched her school, inspired by innovative teaching practices in the US. Many of her female co-graduates, who were ineligible for many of the positions accessible to their male peers, were hired by Adler to teach. Women were prohibited from working in universities at the time, and the vast majority of female college graduates searched for employment as elementary schoolteachers despite obtaining degrees that allowed them to teach at the upper-secondary (high school) level. Lehmann credited her father and Hanna Adler as the most significant influences on her intellectual development.

At age 18, Lehmann achieved a first rank mark in the entrance exam for University of Copenhagen. In 1907, she started her studies in mathematics, chemistry and physics at the University of Copenhagen. She continued her studies of mathematics at Newnham College, Cambridge, from 1910 to 1911. Lehmann faced sex-based adversities there, not being allowed to fully participate in her studies, nor to achieve higher positions of education. As a result, Lehmann had a mental breakdown during her first year in 1911. She returned to Denmark in 1912. She served as an actuarial assistant until 1918 without attending school. She developed her computational skills in the actuary office until she resumed her studies at Copenhagen University in 1918. She completed the candidata magisterii degree in physical science and mathematics in two years, graduating in 1920. This was significant, since this degree was mostly given to male students. After a short period of time, studying mathematics at the University of Hamburg, in 1923 she accepted a position at University of Copenhagen as an assistant to J.F. Steffensen, the professor of actuarial science.

Lehmann's younger sister, Harriet, became an actress. Inge lived alone as an adult. She ended an engagement in March 1917 and decided to remain unmarried in order to pursue an academic career, which was not an unusual choice at the time.

Lehmann once complained to her nephew Niels Groes about the incompetence of her male colleagues, writing, "You should know how many incompetent men I had to compete with — in vain."

== Career ==
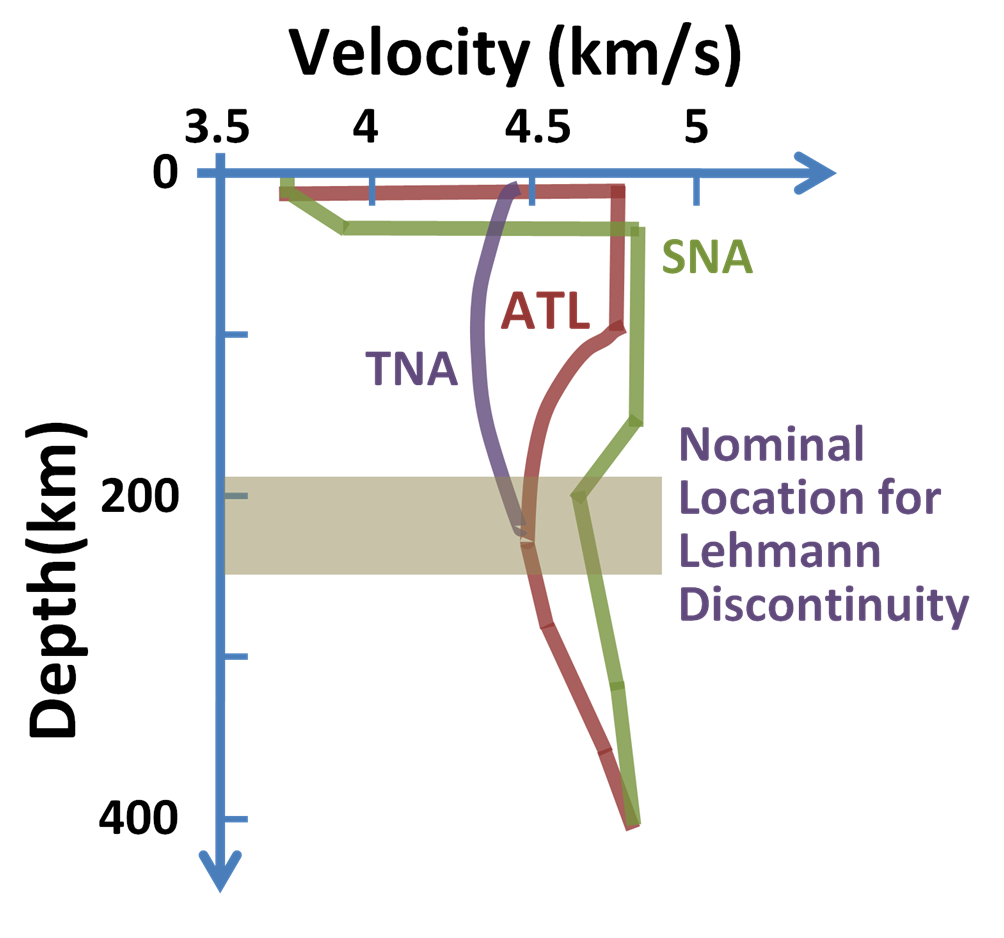
A modern understanding of the Lehmann discontinuity: velocity of seismic S-waves in the Earth near the surface in three tectonic provinces: TNA = Tectonic North America SNA = Shield North America and ATL = North Atlantic.

In 1925, Lehmann was assigned to be the assistant of seismologist Niels Erik Nørlund. She took an interest in his field, and she began studying it on her own. She was chosen as a delegate for Denmark to attend the International Union of Geodesy and Geophysics in 1927—a role she filled another eight times over the next forty years. By 1928, Lehmann obtained a magister scientiarum in seismology, and she was appointed head of the Geodætisk Institut's seismological department the same year. In this position, she was responsible for overseeing the operation of three seismographic observatories, two of which were in Greenland. She personally operated the one in Copenhagen, producing reports based on its readings. Though it was not part of her job, Lehmann also engaged in research at the facility.

In 1929, Lehmann studied the Murchison earthquake which struck on the South Island of New Zealand. She analysed the seismic data from the earthquake and noticed that there were waves of significant amplitude recorded in the Russian cities of Sverdlovsk and Irkutsk, both unexpected locations. Lehmann noticed after reviewing the data from the earthquakes that there were waves emanating from the earthquakes, which were called seismic waves. They were unexpected locations due to the theory that S-waves and some P-waves are deflected by the core creating a shadow area in which waves are not able to pass through. The waves seemed to pass through that area to reach Russia. This led to her discovering that there is a spherical core of solid material at the Earth's centre.

Schematic view of Earth's interior structure.: 1. continental crust; 2. oceanic crust; 3. upper mantle; 4. lower mantle; 5. outer core; 6. inner core — discovered by Lehmann; 1. Mohorovičić discontinuity; 2. core–mantle boundary; 3. outer core–inner core boundary

Lehmann was the first to interpret P-wave arrivals as reflections from an inner core. Lehmann observed seismic waves from earthquakes, leading her to hypothesize that the Earth's core consisted of two parts: "a solid metal core surrounded by an outer liquid core, overturning the accepted theory of an entirely liquid core". She published these findings in a paper titled P′ (1936). Prior to 1936, scientists believed that the Earth's core was a single, massive molten sphere. However, many global observations did not analytically add up until Lehmann reached the heart of the issue. The theory she developed was that the Earth consisted of 3 shells: the mantle, outer core and inner core. Lehmann inferred that the core wasn't homogeneous; rather, there is a smaller core that exists that is surrounded by the outer core. She deduced that waves travel faster in the smaller core, but the waves can be reflected off if it arrived tangentially. Her theory allows for another wave deflection at the extra boundary and this accounts for the direction and location in which the waves emerge. Other leading seismologists of the time, such as Beno Gutenberg, Charles Richter, and Harold Jeffreys, adopted this interpretation within two or three years, but it took until 1971 for the interpretation to be shown correct by computer calculations. She continued her work during World War II, though international collaboration was limited.

When American geologist Maurice Ewing visited her station in 1951, he invited Lehmann to work at the Lamont Geological Observatory, now called the Lamont–Doherty Earth Observatory, that he ran at Columbia University. She was invited there to study the seismic wave 'Lg', which was a new seismic wave being researched by Maurice Ewing and Professor Frank Press. She studied there for a few months in 1952, after her retirement from the Royal Geodetic Institute.

She retired from her position as head of the Geodætisk Institut's seismological department in 1953, giving her more time to conduct research over the following decades. Throughout the 1950s and 1960s, Lehmann travelled to North America several times and visited different seismological observatories throughout the United States and Canada. She became a prominent member of the community at the University of California, Berkeley, one of her most frequent stops. During the 1960s, Lehmann was able to explore more of the Earth using new technologies made specifically for detecting nuclear bombs during the Cold War.

While in the United States, Lehmann collaborated with Maurice Ewing and Frank Press on investigations of the Earth's crust and upper mantle. During this work, she discovered another seismic discontinuity, which is a step-change increase in the speed of seismic waves at depths between 190 and 250 km. This discontinuity was named the Lehmann discontinuity after her. Francis Birch noted that the "Lehmann discontinuity was discovered through exacting scrutiny of seismic records by a master of a black art for which no amount of computerization is likely to be a complete substitute."

Lehmann was also involved in the creation of the International Seismological Centre from 1961 to 1967.

== Awards, honours, and legacy ==
Lehmann's discoveries continue to play a vital role in geophysics. Her groundbreaking work provided the basis for modern seismic imaging techniques, which have become essential for exploring Earth's interior and monitoring nuclear tests. The seismic discontinuities she identified, including the Lehmann discontinuity, have been key to advancing our understanding of Earth's thermal history. Decades after she died her contributions remained a cornerstone of geophysical research.

Lehmann received many honours for her scientific achievements, among them are

- the Harry Oscar Wood Award in 1960,
- the Emil Wiechert Medal in 1964,
- the Gold Medal of the Danish Royal Society of Science and Letters 1965,
- the Tagea Brandt Rejselegat in 1938 and 1967,
- her election as a Fellow of the Royal Society in 1969,
- the William Bowie Medal in 1971, which she was the first woman to ever win the award, and
- the Medal of the Seismological Society of America in 1977.
- honorary doctorates from Columbia University in 1964 and from the University of Copenhagen in 1968, as well as numerous honorific memberships.

Lehmann was also elected to the fellowship of the Royal Astronomical Society in 1936, and later became an Associate of the Royal Astronomical Society in 1957.

Because of her contribution to geological science, in 1996, the American Geophysical Union established the annual Inge Lehmann Medal to honour "outstanding contributions to the understanding of the structure, composition, and dynamics of the Earth's mantle and core." The medal has been given out annually ever since, and includes a portrait of Lehmann on the front.

The asteroid 5632 Ingelehmann was named in Lehmann's honour. In 2015, a species of beetle was named after her on the hundredth anniversary of women's suffrage in Denmark:Globicornis (Hadrotoma) ingelehmannae. In the same year, on the 127th anniversary of her birth, Google dedicated its worldwide Google Doodle to Lehmann.

A memorial dedicated to Lehmann was installed on Frue Plads in Copenhagen on 15 May 2017, designed by Danish artist, Elisabeth Toubro. The monument consists of a 8.8 m tall black diabase and patinated bronze. It is one of six portrait busts stood in front of the University of Copenhagen.

She will appear on a 2028 Danish krone banknote.

== Key publications ==
- Lehmann, Inge (1936). "P'". Publications du Bureau Central Séismologique International. A14 (3): 87–115.

== See also ==
- Richard Dixon Oldham
- List of geophysicists
- Timeline of women in science
