= Lehmann discontinuity =

Geologic boundary

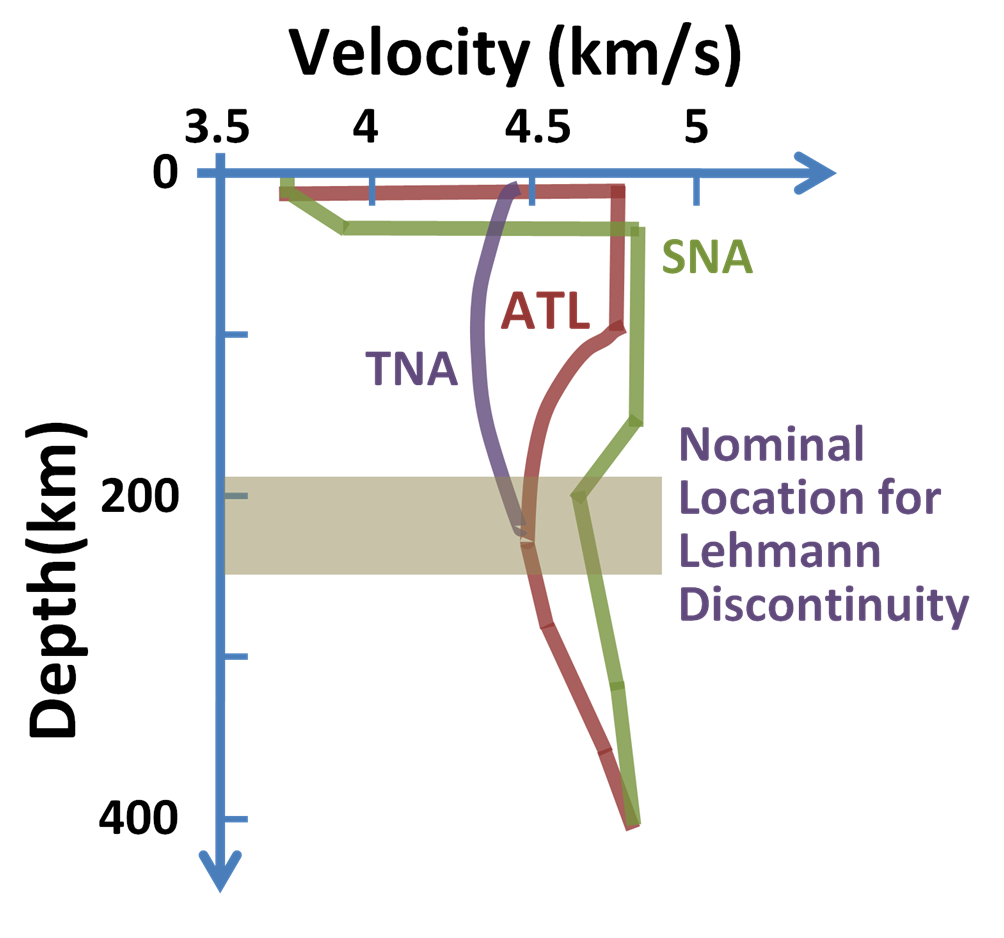
Velocity of seismic S-waves in the Earth near the surface in three tectonic provinces: TNA = Tectonic North America, SNA = Shield North America and ATL = North Atlantic.

The Lehmann discontinuity is an abrupt increase of P-wave and S-wave velocities at the depth of 220 km (140 mi) in Earth's mantle, discovered by seismologist Inge Lehmann. It appears beneath continents, but not usually beneath oceans, and does not readily appear in globally averaged studies. Several explanations have been proposed: a lower limit to the pliable asthenosphere, a phase transition, and most plausibly, depth variation in the shear wave anisotropy.

== General references ==
- P. Caloi (1967). "The "20° Discontinuity"". In H. E. Landsberg, J. Van Mieghem (ed.). Advances in geophysics, Volume 12. Academic Press. p. 167 ff. ISBN 0-12-018812-0. – some historic background.
