= Inner core super-rotation =

Concept in geodynamics

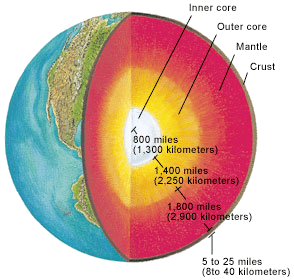
Cutaway of the Earth showing the inner core (white) and outer core (yellow)

Inner core super-rotation is a hypothesized eastward rotation of the inner core of Earth relative to its mantle, for a net rotation rate that is usually faster than Earth as a whole. A 1995 model of Earth's dynamo proposed super-rotations of up to 3 degrees per year; the following year, a seismic study claimed that the proposal was supported by observed discrepancies in the time that p-waves take to travel through the inner and outer core. However, the hypothesis of super-rotation is disputed in the later seismic studies.

The seismic support of inner core super-rotations was based on the changes of seismic waves that transversed inside the inner core and free oscillations of Earth. The results are inconsistent between the studies. A localized temporal change of the inner core surface was discovered in 2006 and the temporal change of inner core surface also provided an explanation to the seismic evidence that was attributed to the hypothesis of inner core super-rotations. Recent studies indicated that a super-rotation of the inner core is inconsistent with the seismic data. Some studies proposed both the inner core super-rotation and localized temporal changes of inner core surface co-exist to consistently explain the seismic data, but other studies indicated that localized temporal changes of the inner core surface alone are enough to explain the seismic data.

== Background ==
At the center of Earth is the core, a ball with a mean radius of 3480 kilometres that is composed mostly of iron. The outer core is liquid while the inner core, with a radius of 1220 km, is solid. Because the outer core has a low viscosity, it could be rotating at a different rate from the mantle and crust. This possibility was first proposed in 1975 to explain a phenomenon of Earth's magnetic field called westward drift: some parts of the field rotate about 0.2 degrees per year westward relative to Earth's surface. In 1981, David Gubbins of Leeds University predicted that a differential rotation of the inner and outer core could generate a large toroidal magnetic field near the shared boundary, accelerating the inner core to the rate of westward drift. This would be in opposition to the Earth's rotation, which is eastwards, so the overall rotation would be slower.

In 1995, Gary Glatzmeier at Los Alamos and Paul Roberts at UCLA published the first "self-consistent" three-dimensional model of the dynamo in the core. (Note: "self-consistent" means that the model takes into account the feedback between the motion of the conducting fluid and the magnetic field it generates.) The model predicted that the inner core rotates 3 degrees per year faster than the mantle, a phenomenon that became known as super-rotation. 1996, Xiaodong Song and Paul G. Richards, scientists at the Lamont–Doherty Earth Observatory, presented seismic evidence for a super-rotation of 0.4 to 1.8 degrees per year, while another study estimated the super-rotation to be 3 degrees per year.

== Seismic observations ==
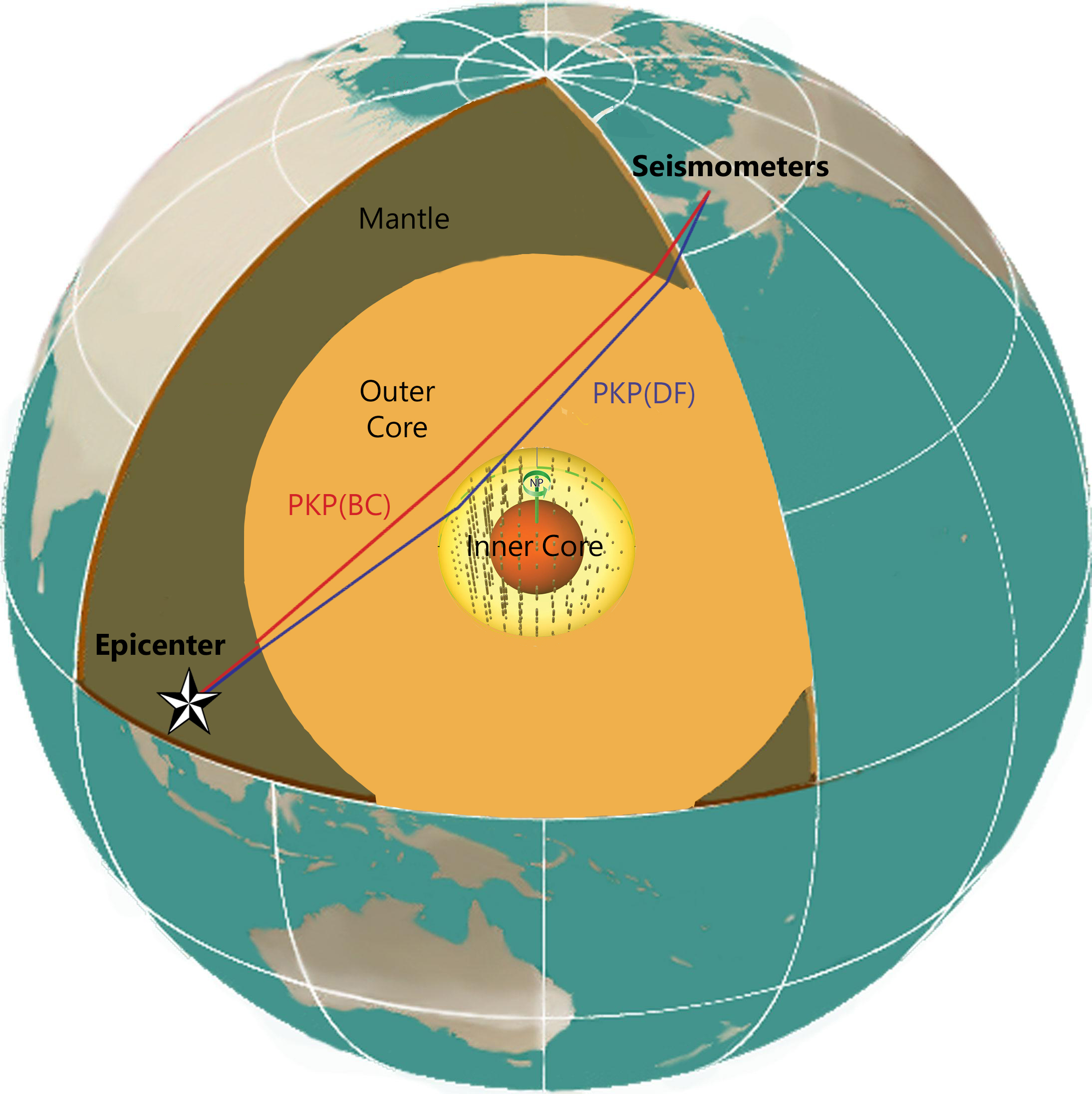
Schematic of PKP(BC) and PKP(DF) waves

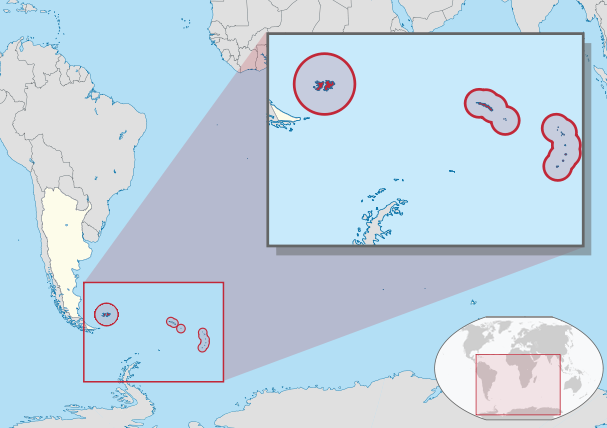
Location of the South Sandwich Islands, which are nearly antipodal to Alaska.

The main observational constraints on inner core rotation come from seismology. When an earthquake occurs, two kinds of seismic wave travel down through the Earth: those with ground motion in the direction the wave propagates (p-waves) and those with transverse motion (s-waves). S-waves do not travel through the outer core because they involve shear stress, a type of deformation that cannot occur in a liquid. In seismic notation, a p-wave is represented by the letter P when traveling through the crust and mantle and by the letter K when traveling through the outer core. A wave that travels through the mantle, core and mantle again before reaching the surface is represented by PKP. For geometric reasons, two branches of PKP are distinguished: PKP(AB) through the upper part of the outer core, and PKP(BC) through the lower part. A wave passing through the inner core is referred to as PKP(DF). (Alternate names for these phases are PKP1, PKP2 and PKIKP.) Seismic waves can travel multiple paths from an earthquake to a given sensor.

PKP(BC) and PKP(DF) waves have similar paths in the mantle, so any difference in the overall travel time is mainly due to the difference in wave speeds between the outer and inner core. Song and Richards looked at how this difference changed over time. Waves traveling from south to north (emitted by earthquakes in the South Sandwich Islands and received at Fairbanks, Alaska) had a differential that changed by 0.4 seconds between 1967 and 1995. By contrast, waves traveling near the equatorial plane (e.g., between Tonga and Germany) showed no change.

One of the criticisms of the early estimates of super-rotation was that uncertainties about the hypocenters of the earthquakes, particularly those in the earlier records, caused errors in the measurement of travel times. This error can be reduced by using data for doublet earthquakes. These are earthquakes that have very similar waveforms, indicating that the earthquakes were very close to each other (within about a kilometer). Using doublet data from the South Sandwich Islands, a study in 2015 arrived at a new estimate of 0.41° per year.

Seismic observations – in particular "temporal changes between repeated seismic waves that should traverse the same path through the inner core" – were used to reveal a core rotation slow-down around 2009. This is not thought to have major effects and one cycle of the oscillation in rotation is thought to be about seven decades, coinciding with several other geophysical periodicities, "especially the length of day and magnetic field".

=== Inner core anisotropy ===
Song and Richards explained their observations in terms of the prevailing model of inner core anisotropy at the time. Waves were observed to travel faster between north and south than along the equatorial plane. A model for the inner core with uniform anisotropy had a direction of fastest travel tilted at an angle 10° from the spin axis of the Earth. Since then, the model for the anisotropy has become more complex. The top 100 kilometers are isotropic. Below that, there is stronger anisotropy in a "western" hemisphere (roughly centered on the Americas) than in an "eastern" hemisphere (the other half of the globe), and the anisotropy may increase with depth. There may also be a different orientation of anisotropy in an "innermost inner core" (IMIC) with a radius of about 550 kilometers.

A group at the University of Cambridge used travel time differentials to estimate the longitudes of the hemisphere boundaries with depth up to 90 kilometers below the inner core boundary. Combining this information with an estimate for the rate of growth for the inner core, they obtained a rate of 0.1–1° per million years.

Estimates of the rotation rate based on travel time differentials have been inconsistent. Those based on the Sandwich Island earthquakes have the fastest rates, although they also have a weaker signal, with PKP(DF) barely emerging above the noise. Estimates based on other paths have been lower or even in the opposite direction. By one analysis, the rotation rate is constrained to be less than 0.1° per year.

=== Heterogeneity ===
A study in 1997 revisited the Sandwich Islands data and came to a different conclusion about the origin of changes in travel times, attributing them to local heterogeneities in wave speeds. The new estimate for super-rotation was reduced to 0.2–0.3° per year.

Inner core rotation has also been estimated using PKiKP waves, which scatter off the surface of the inner core, rather than PKP(DF) waves. Estimates using this method have ranged from 0.05 to 0.15° per year.

=== Normal modes ===
Another way of constraining the inner core rotation is using normal modes (standing waves in Earth), giving a global picture. Heterogeneities in the core split the modes, and changes in the "splitting functions" over time can be used to estimate the rotation rate. However, their accuracy is limited by the shortage of seismic stations in the 1970s and 1980s, and the inferred rotation can be positive or negative depending on the mode. Overall, normal modes are unable to distinguish the rotation rate from zero.

== Theory ==
In the 1995 model of Glatzmeier and Roberts, the inner core is rotated by a mechanism similar to an induction motor. A thermal wind in the outer core gives rise to a circulation pattern with flow from east to west near the inner core boundary. Magnetic fields passing through the inner and outer cores provide a magnetic torque, while viscous torque on the boundary keeps the inner core and the fluid near it rotating at the same rate on average.

The 1995 model did not include the effect of gravitational coupling between density variations in the mantle and topography on the inner core boundary. A 1996 study predicted that it would force the inner core and mantle to rotate at the same rate, but a 1997 paper showed that relative rotation could occur if the inner core was able to change its shape. This would require the viscosity to be less than 1.5×10^{20} pascal-seconds (Pa·s). It also predicted that, if the viscosity were too low (less than 3×10^{16} Pa·s), the inner core would not be able to maintain its seismic anisotropy. However, the source of the anisotropy is still not well understood. A model of the viscosity of the inner core based on Earth's nutations constrains the viscosity to 2–7×10^{14} Pa·s.

Geodynamo models that take into account gravitational locking and changes in the length of day predict a super-rotation rate of only 1° per million years. Some of the inconsistencies between measurements of the rotation may be accommodated if the rotation rate oscillates.

== See also ==
- Inverse problem
