= Thermal history of Earth =

The thermal history of Earth involves the study of the cooling history of Earth's interior. It is a sub-field of geophysics. The study of the thermal evolution of Earth's interior is uncertain and controversial in all aspects, from the interpretation of petrologic observations used to infer the temperature of the interior, to the fluid dynamics responsible for heat loss, to material properties that determine the efficiency of heat transport.

== Overview ==
Observations that can be used to infer the temperature of Earth's interior range from the oldest rocks on Earth to modern seismic images of the inner core size. Ancient volcanic rocks can be associated with a depth and temperature of melting through their geochemical composition. Using this technique and some geological inferences about the conditions under which the rock is preserved, the temperature of the mantle can be inferred. The mantle itself is fully convective, so that the temperature in the mantle is basically constant with depth outside the top and bottom thermal boundary layers. This is not quite true because the temperature in any convective body under pressure must increase along an adiabat, but the adiabatic temperature gradient is usually much smaller than the temperature jumps at the boundaries. Therefore, the mantle is usually associated with a single or potential temperature that refers to the mid-mantle temperature extrapolated along the adiabat to the surface. The potential temperature of the mantle is estimated to be about 1350 C today. There is an analogous potential temperature of the core but since there are no samples from the core its present-day temperature relies on extrapolating the temperature along an adiabat from the inner core boundary, where the iron solidus is somewhat constrained.

== Thermodynamics ==
The simplest mathematical formulation of the thermal history of Earth's interior involves the time evolution of the mid-mantle and mid-core temperatures. To derive these equations one must first write the energy balance for the mantle and the core separately. They are,

$$Q_\text{surf}=Q_\text{sec,man}+Q_\text{rad}+Q_\text{cmb}$$

for the mantle, and

$$Q_\text{cmb}=Q_\text{sec,core}+Q_\text{L}+Q_\text{G}$$

for the core. $Q_\text{surf}$ is the surface heat flow [W] at the surface of the Earth (and mantle), $Q_\text{sec,man}=M_\text{man}c_\text{man}dT_\text{man}/dt$ is the secular cooling heat from the mantle, and $M_\text{man}$, $c_\text{man}$, and $T_\text{man}$ are the mass, specific heat, and temperature of the mantle. $Q_\text{rad}$ is the radiogenic heat production in the mantle and $Q_\text{cmb}$ is the heat flow from the core mantle boundary. $Q_\text{sec,core}=M_\text{core}c_\text{core}dT_\text{core}/dt$ is the secular cooling heat from the core, and $Q_\text{L}$ and $Q_\text{G}$ are the latent and gravitational heat flow from the inner core boundary due to the solidification of iron.

Solving for $dT_\text{man}/dt$ and $dT_\text{core}/dt$ gives,

$$\frac{dT_\text{man}}{dt}=\frac{3(-Q_\text{surf}-Q_\text{cmb})}{4\pi\rho_\text{m} c_\text{m}(R^3-R_\text{c}^3)} + \frac{Q_\text{rad}}{V_\text{m}\rho_\text{m} c_\text{m}}$$

and,

$$\frac{dT_\text{core}}{dt}=Q_\text{cmb}\left[ A_\text{c} (L+E_G)\left(\frac{R_i}{R_\text{c}}\right)^2 \rho_i \frac{dR_i}{dT_\text{cmb}\eta_\text{c}}-\frac{R_\text{c}^3-R_i^3}{3R_\text{c}^3}\rho_\text{c} c_\text{c}\right]^{-1}$$

== Thermal catastrophe ==
In 1862, Lord Kelvin calculated the age of the Earth at between 20 million and 400 million years by assuming that Earth had formed as a completely molten object, and determined the amount of time it would take for the near-surface to cool to its present temperature. Since uniformitarianism required a much older Earth, there was a contradiction. Eventually, the additional heat sources within the Earth were discovered, allowing for a much older age. This section is about a similar paradox in current geology, called the thermal catastrophe.

The thermal catastrophe of the Earth can be demonstrated by solving the above equations for the evolution of the mantle with $Q_\text{cmb}=0$. The catastrophe is defined as when the mean mantle temperature $T_\text{man}$ exceeds the mantle solidus so that the entire mantle melts. Using the geochemically preferred Urey ratio of $Ur=1/3$ and the geodynamically preferred cooling exponent of $\text{beta}=1/3$ the mantle temperature reaches the mantle solidus (i.e. a catastrophe) in 1-2 Ga. This result is clearly unacceptable because geologic evidence for a solid mantle exists as far back as 4 Ga (and possibly further). Hence, the thermal catastrophe problem is the foremost paradox in the thermal history of the Earth.

== New Core Paradox ==
The "New Core Paradox" posits that the new upward revisions to the empirically measured thermal conductivity of iron at the pressure and temperature conditions of Earth's core imply that the dynamo is thermally stratified at present, driven solely by compositional convection associated with the solidification of the inner core. However, wide spread paleomagnetic evidence for a geodynamo older than the likely age of the inner core (~1 Gyr) creates a paradox as to what powered the geodynamo prior to inner core nucleation. Recently it has been proposed that a higher core cooling rate and lower mantle cooling rate can resolve the paradox in part. However, the paradox remains unresolved.

Also, recent geochemical experiments have led to the proposal that radiogenic heat in the core is larger than previously thought. This revision, if true, would also alleviate issues with the core heat budget by providing an additional energy source back in time.

== See also ==
- Earth's inner core
- Earth's magnetic field
- Earth's structure
- Geologic temperature record
- List of periods and events in climate history
- Paleothermometer
- Radiative forcing
- Timeline of glaciation
