= Simon–Glatzel equation =

The Simon–Glatzel equation is an empirical correlation describing the pressure dependence of the melting temperature of a solid. The pressure dependence of the melting temperature is small for small pressure changes because the volume change during fusion or melting is rather small. However, at very high pressures higher melting temperatures are generally observed as the liquid usually occupies a larger volume than the solid making melting more thermodynamically unfavorable at elevated pressure. If the liquid has a smaller volume than the solid (as for ice and liquid water) a higher pressure leads to a lower melting point.

== The equation and its variations ==
$$T_m = T_\text{ref} \left( \frac{ P - P_\text{ref} }{a} + 1 \right)^{b}$$

$T_\text{ref}$ and $P_\text{ref}$ are normally the temperature and the pressure of the triple point, but the normal melting temperature at atmospheric pressure are also commonly used as reference point because the normal melting point is much more easily accessible. Typically $P_\text{ref}$ is then set to 0. $a$ and $b$ are component-specific parameters.

The Simon–Glatzel equation can be viewed as a combination of the Murnaghan equation of state and the Lindemann law, and an alternative form was proposed by J. J. Gilvarry (1956):

$T_m = T_\text{ref} \left(K_0^{'} \frac{P - P_\text{ref} }{K_0} + 1 \right)^{\frac{2(\gamma -1)}{3+f}}$

where $K_0$ is general $K$ at $P = 0$, $K_0^{'}$ is pressure derivative $K$ at $P = 0$, $\gamma$ is Grüneisen ratio, and $f$ is the coefficient in Morse potential.

== Example parameters ==
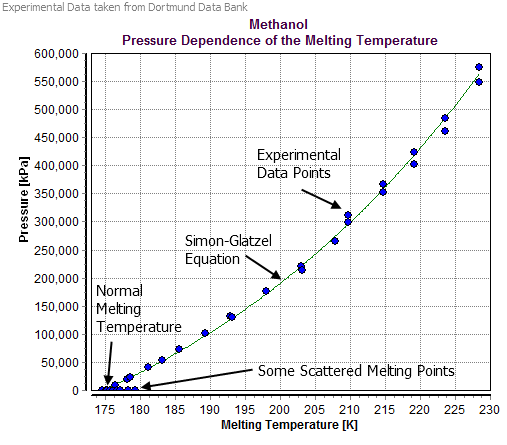
Methanol melting temperature versus pressure

For methanol the following parameters can be obtained:

a	188158	kPa
a	188.158	MPa
b^{−1}	5.15905	
T_{min}	174.61	K
T_{max}	228.45	K
P_{max}	575000	kPa
P_{max}	575.000	MPa

The reference temperature has been T_{ref} = 174.61 K and the reference pressure P_{ref} has been set to 0 kPa.

Methanol is a component where the Simon–Glatzel works well in the given validity range.

== Extensions and generalizations ==
The Simon–Glatzel equation is a monotonically increasing function. It can only describe the melting curves that rise indefinitely with increasing pressure. It may fail to describe the melting curves with a negative pressure dependence or local maximums. A damping term that asymptotically slopes down under pressure, $D(P) = \exp[-c(P - P_\text{ref})]$ (c is another component-specific parameter), is introduced by Vladimir V. Kechin to extend the Simon–Glatzel equation so that all melting curves, rising, falling, and flattening, as well as curves with a maximum, can be described by a unified equation:

$T_m = F(P)\cdot D(P)$

where $F(P)$ is the Simon–Glatzel equation (rising) and $D(P)$ is the damping term (falling or flattening).

The unified equation may be rewritten as:

$T_m = T_\text{ref} \left( \frac{ P - P_\text{ref} }{a} + 1 \right)^{b}\cdot \exp[-c (P - P_\text{ref})]$

This form predicts that all solids have a maximum melting temperature at a positive or (fictitious) negative pressure.
