= International Ocean Discovery Program =

Research collaboration of the subseafloor

The International Ocean Discovery Program (IODP) was an international marine research collaboration dedicated to advancing scientific understanding of the Earth through drilling, coring, and monitoring the subseafloor. The research enabled by IODP samples and data improves scientific understanding of changing climate and ocean conditions, the origins of ancient life, risks posed by geohazards, and the structure and processes of Earth's tectonic plates and uppermost mantle. IODP began in 2013, running for eleven years until 2024. It built on the research of four previous scientific ocean drilling programs: Project Mohole, Deep Sea Drilling Project, Ocean Drilling Program, and Integrated Ocean Drilling Program. Together, these programs represent the longest running international Earth science collaboration.

== Scientific scope ==
The scientific scope of IODP is laid out in the program's science plan, Illuminating Earth's Past, Present, and Future. The science plan covers a 10-year period of operations and consists of a list of scientific challenges that are organized into four themes called Climate and Ocean Change, Biosphere Frontiers, Earth Connections, and Earth in Motion. The science plan was developed by the international scientific community to identify the highest priority science for the program.

== IODP funding and operations ==
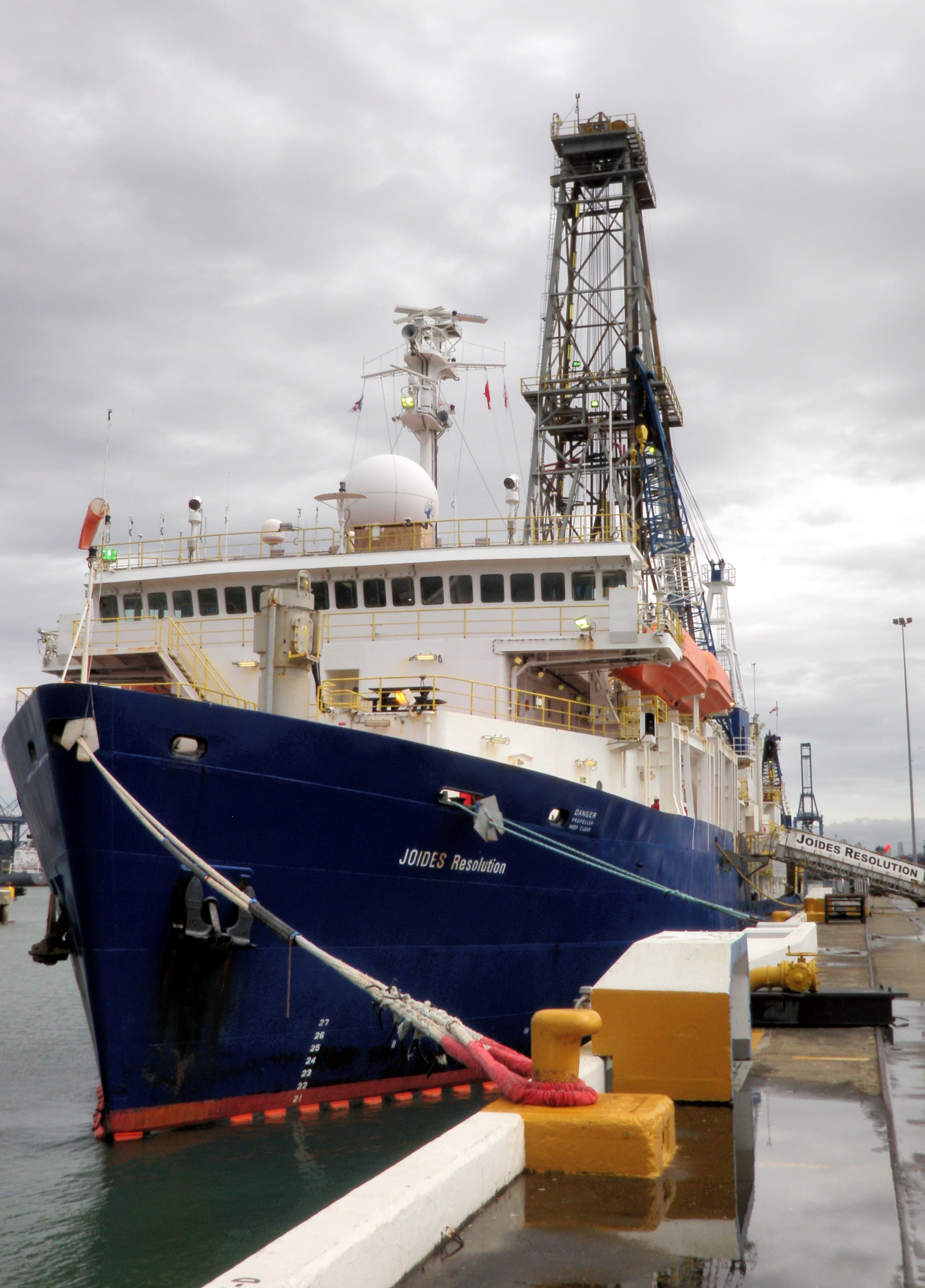
JOIDES Resolution docked in Panama, October 2012

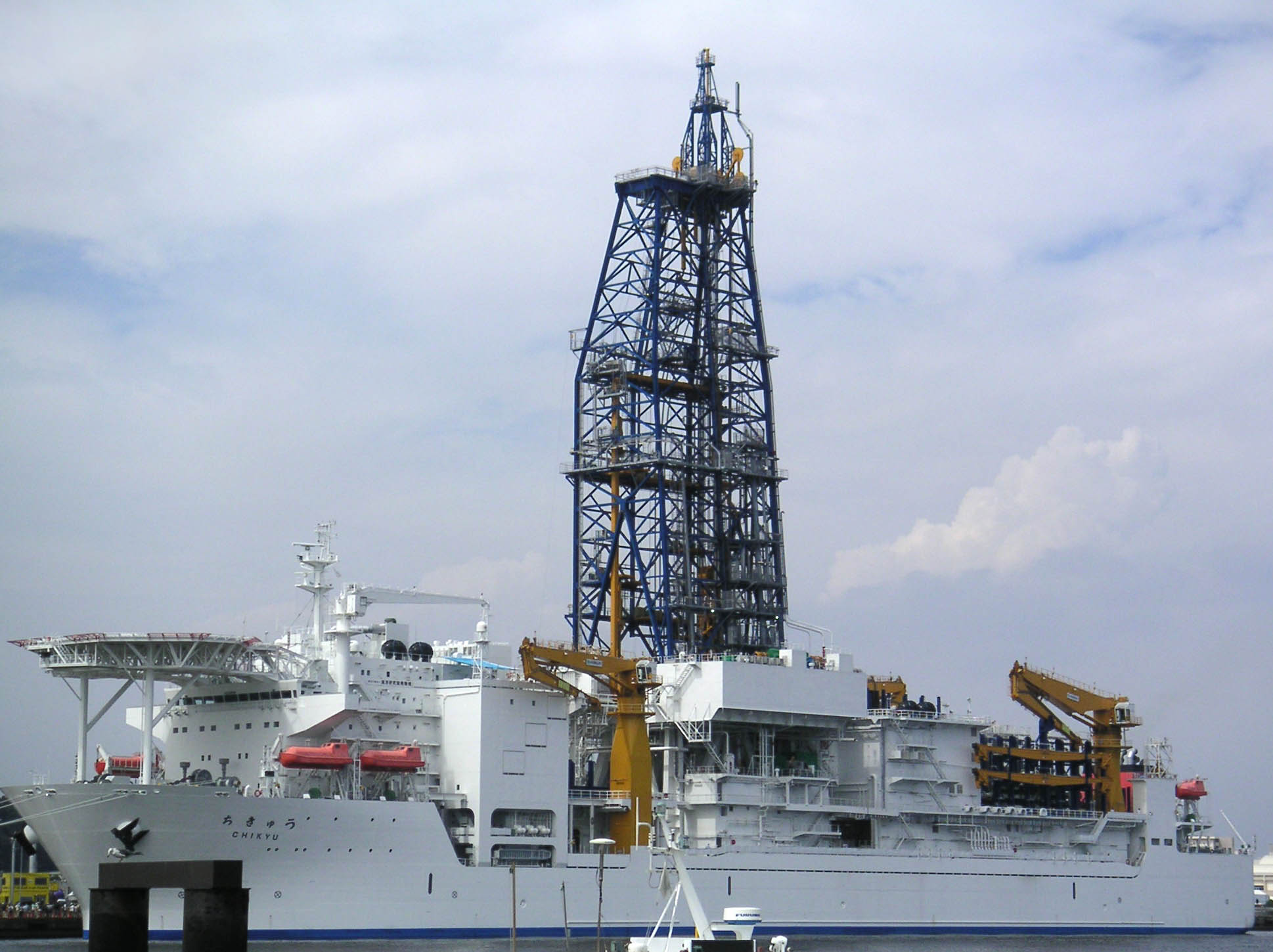
Chikyū docked in Yokosuka New Port, Kanagawa, Japan, September 2005

IODP used multiple drilling platforms (JOIDES Resolution, Chikyū, and mission-specific platforms) to access different subseafloor environments during research expeditions. These facilities were funded by the U.S. National Science Foundation (NSF), Japan's Ministry of Education, Culture, Sports, Science and Technology (MEXT), and the European Consortium for Ocean Research Drilling (ECORD), alongside the Ministry of Science and Technology of the People's Republic of China (MOST), Australian-New Zealand IODP Consortium (ANZIC), and India's Ministry of Earth Science (MoES). Together, these entities represented a coalition of over two dozen countries. The IODP funding model differed from the Integrated Ocean Drilling Program in that NSF, MEXT, and ECORD each managed their own drilling platform. International partners directly contributed to the operating costs of the drilling platforms in exchange for scientific participation on the expeditions and seats on the advisory panels.

The research vessel JOIDES Resolution (JR) was managed and operated for NSF by the JOIDES Resolution Science Operator (JRSO), based at Texas A&M University (TAMU). The JRSO was formalized as the implementing organization for IODP in 2014.

The drilling vessel Chikyū was constructed and operated for MEXT by Japan's Center for Deep Earth Exploration (CDEX), which was established within the Japan Agency for Marine-Earth Science and Technology (JAMSTEC) in October 2002. In 2019, JAMSTEC merged CDEX with its Marine Technology and Engineering Center (MARITEC) to create a new department, the Institute of Marine-Earth Exploration and Engineering (MarE3). MarE3 is the current implementing organization for Chikyū.

The ECORD Science Operator (ESO), established in 2003, was the implementing organization for mission-specific platform expeditions. ESO is also responsible for managing the Bremen Core Repository.

IODP expeditions were based on research proposals submitted by scientists that addressed the objectives described in the program's science plan. Advisory panels of international experts then rigorously evaluated proposals for science quality, feasibility, safety, and any environmental issues. Proposals that were determined to be of high quality were forwarded to the appropriate facility board (JOIDES Resolution Facility Board, Chikyū IODP Board, and ECORD Facility Board) for scheduling.

IODP published a detailed account of findings and made all samples and cores freely available. IODP's open data policy assured global access to the information collected by the program, and it allowed scientists to use data from multiple expeditions to investigate new hypotheses.

Cores collected during expeditions are stored at core repositories in Bremen, Germany (Bremen Core Repository), College Station, Texas (Gulf Coast Repository), and Kochi, Japan (Kochi Core Center). Scientists may visit any one of the facilities for onsite research or request a loan for teaching purposes/analysis. Archived cores include not only IODP samples, but also those retrieved by the Deep Sea Drilling Project, Ocean Drilling Program, and Integrated Ocean Drilling Program.

== Outcomes ==
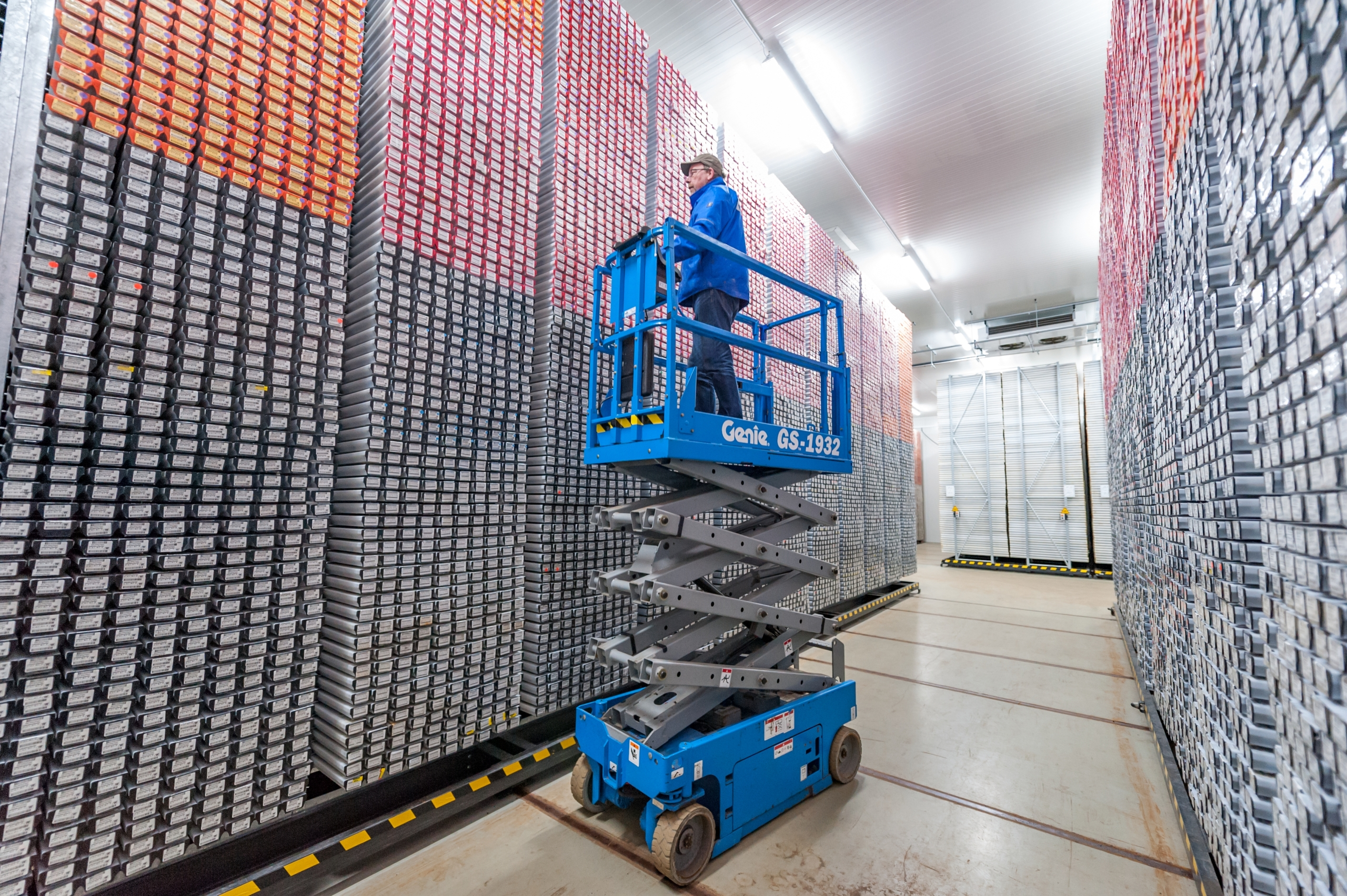
The IODP drill core repository in Bremen University of Bremen (MARUM)

IODP expeditions investigated a wide range of Earth science topics, including past climate and ocean conditions, monsoon systems, seismogenic zones, the formation of continental crust and ocean basins, major extinction events, the role of serpentinization in driving hydrothermal systems, and the temperature limits of life in the deep biosphere.

An early outcome of the program harkens back to the original motivation for scientific ocean drilling with Project Mohole – drilling and sampling across the Mohorovičić discontinuity (Moho) and into the upper part of Earth's mantle. Expedition 360 was the initial part a multiphase project whose goal, among others, was to directly sample the mantle for the first time. The expedition took place near the Southwest Indian Ridge at a location where the crust is particularly thin due to the formation of an oceanic core complex. Expedition 360 completed 790 meters of drilling and IODP planned to return to the site to continue the research.

Expedition 364 sampled the peak ring of the Chicxulub impact crater, which is buried offshore near the Yucatán Peninsula. Chicxulub is the only well-preserved crater on Earth with a peak ring and was formed when an asteroid slammed into the planet 66 million years ago, killing off non-avian dinosaurs and most life on the planet. Analysis of the collected samples and data shows that the asteroid's impact caused rocks from deep in the Earth to shoot up and form the large mountains of the peak ring in a matter of minutes. The sediments overlying the peak ring also provide a record of how life returned to the area after the mass extinction event.

In addition to studying how the Earth moves in response to impact events, IODP also studied the processes that cause earthquakes. For example, Expedition 362 brought new insight to the 2004 Indian Ocean earthquake and tsunami through the sampling and analysis of sediments and rocks from the oceanic plate that feeds the Sumatra subduction zone. The science team discovered that the sediment's minerals dehydrated before reaching the subduction zone, resulting in a strong fault that allowed for a larger than previously expected earthquake to occur.

IODP's early climate studies focused on efforts to understand the Asian monsoon system. Expeditions 353, 354, 355, and 359 collected sediments from the Bay of Bengal, the Andaman Sea, and the Arabian Sea. These sediments were eroded from the land and primarily carried by rivers to the ocean, where some of the sediments have laid buried for millions of years. By analyzing the chemical and physical properties of the sediments, scientists are learning about the evolution of mountain growth, monsoonal precipitation, weathering and erosion, and climate across the region and across multiple time scales. For example, one such study discovered that the monsoonal winds that drive the region's climate began suddenly 12.9 million years ago.

Scientific studies from subseafloor instruments and IODP's core archives, which contain samples from this and previous ocean drilling programs, are also yielding insights into the Earth's climate and tectonic history. A study examining samples collected from around the world concluded that the rate of carbon release today is 10 times greater than during the Paleocene Eocene Thermal Maximum or anytime during the past 66 million years. And, measurements taken in the Nankai Trough near Japan show that slow slip earthquakes are releasing about 50% of the subduction zone's energy, which has implications for understanding tsunami hazards.

== Coring statistics ==
October 2013 to September 2024 (Expeditions 349–403)

Expeditions completed:	Operations days:	Distance traveled (nmi):	Sites visited:	Holes drilled:	Cores recovered:
48	3,994	208,615	220	599	16,226

	Latitude, Longitude	Geographic area & cruise
Northernmost site:	79.1°N, 4°29E	Eastern Fram Strait Paleo-Archive, Expedition 403
Southernmost site:	76.6°S, 174.8°W	Ross Sea West Antarctic Ice Sheet, Expedition 374

	Meters	Feet	Miles	Geographic area & cruise
Deepest hole penetrated:	1,806	5,925	1.12	IBM Rear Arc, Expedition 350, Hole U1437E
Shallowest water depth:	98	321	0.06	Indonesian Throughflow, Expedition 356
Deepest water depth:	5,012	16,444	3.11	South Atlantic Transect Reentry Installations, Expedition 390C
Total penetration (cored & drilled):	173,949	570,697	108.1	
Total cored interval:	124,108	407,178	77.1	
Total core recovered:	93,294	306,081	58.0	
Most core recovered on a single cruise:	6,956	22,822	4.3	Western Pacific Warm Pool, Expedition 363

== See also ==
- Project Mohole
- Deep Sea Drilling Project
- Integrated Ocean Drilling Program
- International Continental Scientific Drilling Program
- Scientific Drilling
- Marine Geology
