= JOIDES =

JOIDES may refer to:

- Joint Oceanographic Institutes Deep Earth Sampling Project; an international geological oceanographic project
- JOIDES Resolution, a drill ship used by the project
- JOIDES Basin, a sea basin located in the Ross Sea, Antarctica, of the Southern Ocean
