= SCIMPI =

Subsea borehole instrument

The Simple Cabled Instrument for Measuring Parameters In-Situ (SCIMPI) is a relatively new instrument designed for deployment in an ocean borehole to study dynamic processes in sedimented sub-seabed regions.

The SCIMPI system collects time series data on sub-seafloor temperature, pressure, and electrical resistivity at multiple depths, after the borehole is collapsed on the instrument. It was developed as a simpler, more cost-effective, and quicker-to-deploy alternative to CORK sub-seafloor observatories. The modular design of SCIMPI allows for flexible customization on-site based on the objectives of the study and local geological conditions. SCIMPI operates on battery power for 3 to 6 years. Batteries can be replaced by retrieving the seafloor command module in which the data are recorded. The instrument can be connected by cable.

IODP Expedition 341S was the first full-scale test of the SCIMPI prototype. Consisting of nine measurement modules, the prototype was successfully deployed by the drilling and research vessel JOIDES Resolution at ODP site U1416 in May 2013.

In August 2025, SCIMPI was deployed during Expedition 501: New England Shelf Hydrology, a joint effort between the NSF and IODP3, providing long term monitoring capability of aquifer properties.
