= IODP =

IODP may refer to:

- International Ocean Discovery Program, a marine research program that began in 2013
- Integrated Ocean Drilling Program, a marine research program between 2003 and 2013
