= Project Mohole =

Attempt to drill through Earth's crust

Project Mohole – Phase 1 test
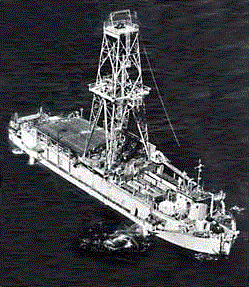
- CUSS I
- Date: March–April 1961
- Location: Off Guadalupe Island, Mexico, Pacific Ocean
- Participants: Willard Bascom, Walter Munk, Roger Revelle, John Steinbeck, William Riedel
- Outcome: First successful test of deep-ocean drilling techniques

Project Mohole was an attempt in the early 1960s to drill through the Earth's crust to obtain samples of the Mohorovičić discontinuity, or Moho, the boundary between the Earth's crust and mantle. The project was intended to provide an earth science complement to the high-profile Space Race. While such a project was not feasible on land, drilling in the open ocean was more feasible because the mantle lies much closer to the sea floor.

Led by a group of scientists called the American Miscellaneous Society with funding from the National Science Foundation, the project suffered from political and scientific opposition, mismanagement, and cost overruns. The U.S. House of Representatives defunded it in 1966. By then, a program of sediment drilling had branched from Project Mohole to become the Deep Sea Drilling Project.

== Background ==
The Mohorovičić discontinuity, or Moho, lies between the bottom of Earth's crust and the solid uppermost mantle. The Moho, denoted here by the green line, is closer to the surface under the oceans than under the continents.

During discussions at the end of a panel reviewing proposals for Earth Sciences at the National Science Foundation in March 1957, Walter Munk, a professor of geophysics and oceanography at the Scripps Institution of Oceanography, suggested the idea behind the Mohole Project: to drill into the Mohorovicic Discontinuity and obtain a sample of the Earth's mantle. The suggestion, in response to the set of fine, but modest, proposals they had just reviewed, was made as a bold new idea and without regard to cost. Harry Hess, a professor of geology at Princeton University, was receptive to the idea.

Hess was one of the principal proponents of sea-floor spreading or plate tectonics at the time, and he saw the Mohole Project as a means to test this theory. The project was to exploit the fact that the mantle was much closer to the ocean's floor (5–10 km) than to the surface of land over continents (ca. 30 km), suggesting that drilling to the mantle from the ocean would be more feasible.

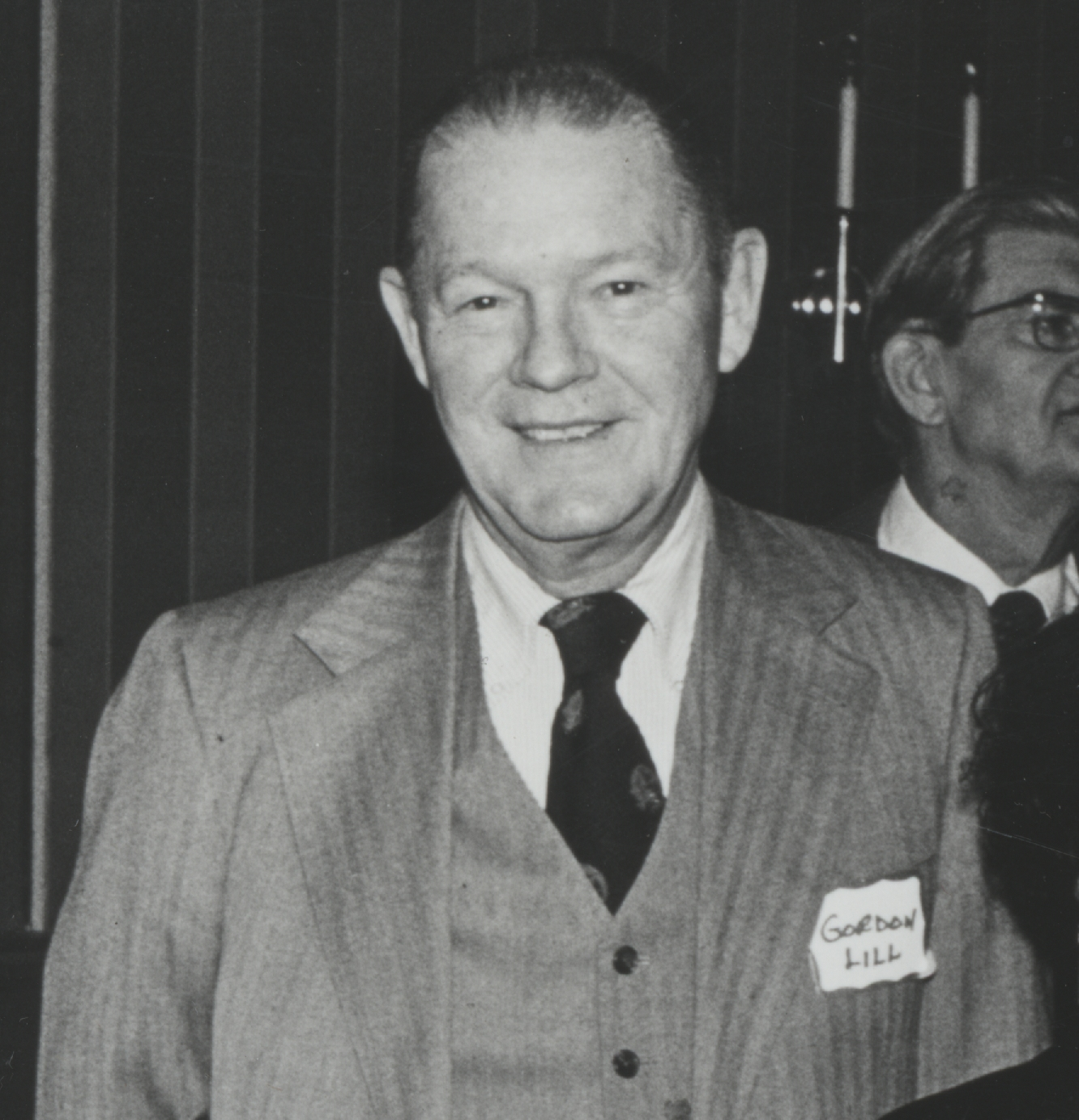
Dr. Gordon Lill, deputy director of the National Ocean Survey, and head of the American Miscellaneous Society, the founding group of the Deep Sea Drilling Project

The idea for the project was initially developed by the informal group of scientists known as the American Miscellaneous Society (AMSOC), including Hess, Munk, Gordon Lill, Roger Revelle, Harry Ladd, Joshua Tracey, William Rubey, Maurice Ewing, and Arthur Maxwell. Lill, who headed the Geophysics Branch of the Office of Naval Research, had formed this whimsically-named society to assist in processing a disparate variety of proposals (of a miscellaneous nature) for funds in the earth sciences. Hess had approached Lill with the Mohole idea, and they eventually decided that AMSOC should submit a proposal to the National Science Foundation to develop the project. The name of this organization was often viewed as a joke, however, and it would later prove troublesome to the project's success.

The initial proposal to NSF was rejected because of the informal nature of the originating organization, and it had to be resubmitted as a proposal from the National Academy of Sciences (NAS); several members of AMSOC were also members of NAS. The proposal resulted in a $15,000 grant in June 1958 for a feasibility study of Mohole, and Willard Bascom, an ocean engineer, oceanographer, and geologist, became the Executive Secretary of AMSOC.

On October 4, 1957, the Soviet Union launched the Sputnik 1 satellite that initiated the Space Race and a revolution in science and education in the United States. The ever-present competition with the Russians provided a positive political background to the Mohole Project, particularly after rumors that the Russians were attempting a similar drilling program. Other aspects favorable to Mohole were that it was the first big science project in Earth Sciences and that it was a new idea distinct from the many space programs that were underway as a result of the Sputnik crisis; the National Aeronautics and Space Administration (NASA) was established in 1958.

With the new funding, AMSOC formed three panels in 1958: the Drilling Panel, the Site Selection Panel, and the Scientific Objectives and Measurements Panel, and in April 1959 Bascom became the Technical Director for the Mohole Project. The AMSOC Committee, within the National Academy of Sciences, became both advisor and manager for the project. By mid-1959, the NAS Governing Board had given AMSOC authorization to proceed with preliminary studies and Phase 1 of Mohole with a budget of up to $2.5M. Project Mohole was to proceed in three phases: Phase 1, an experimental drilling program; Phase 2, an intermediate vessel and drilling program; and Phase 3, drilling to the Moho.

== Phase 1 ==
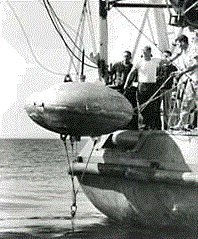
One of the six submerged buoys used for dynamic positioning in Project Mohole. They were lowered to about 200 ft (60 m) into a circular pattern. The CUSS I would then use sonar to maneuver itself in the center of that circle.

Phase 1 was executed in early 1961, with innovative ocean engineering culminating in test bore holes. Led by Bascom, Project Mohole contracted with Global Marine of Los Angeles for the use of its oil drill ship CUSS I. The name of the drill ship was derived from the consortium of oil companies that had developed it in 1956, Continental, Union, Superior and Shell Oil. The ship was to be a technological test bed for the nascent offshore oil industry. CUSS I was one of the first vessels in the world capable of drilling in deep water, though it had been limited to depths of 100 m or a few hundred feet. Project Mohole expanded its operational depth by inventing what is now known as dynamic positioning. By mounting four large outboard motors on the ship, positioning the ship within surrounding moorings using acoustic techniques, and guiding the motors by a central joy stick, CUSS I could maintain a position within a radius of 180 m (600 feet). Such unprecedented position keeping enabled the drilling to occur in deep water.

With William Riedel as chief scientist, initial test drillings into the sea floor occurred off Guadalupe Island, Mexico, in March and April 1961. The event was documented by John Steinbeck for an article in Life magazine. The location was determined based on world-wide seismic refraction studies by principal investigator of the project marine geophysicist George G. Shor and others, and its proximity to San Diego, where CUSS I was located. A recent such study by Shor near Guadalupe Island had shown that the sea floor of the area had interesting layering features, suggesting the drilling could confirm properties derived from the seismic studies. The layers were of geologic interest in their own right.

Five holes were drilled, the deepest to 183 m (601 feet) below the sea floor in 3,600 m (11,700 feet) of water. This drilling was unprecedented: not because of the hole's depth, but because an untethered platform in deep water was able to drill into the sea floor. Also, the core samples proved to be valuable, penetrating through Miocene-age sediments for the first time with the lowest 13 m (44 feet) consisting of basalt. This lowest layer, of volcanic origin, confirmed the properties derived by the seismic studies. This test drilling program was seen by all as a great success, attracting the attention of both the scientific community and the oil industry. The test was completed in a timely manner and under budget, costing $1.7M.

Bascom reviewed the geologic science behind the Mohole Project, the required drilling engineering, and the CUSS I test drills in his book A Hole in the Bottom of the Sea, published in 1961.

Robert Ballard, in a talk at Wayne State University in 1969, stated that as far as he was concerned, the goal of the project was never to drill down to the Moho. It was to develop the technology to drill holes in deep water with a rig that was not tethered to the bottom.

== Controversy and cancellation of later phases ==
As Munk commented in 2010, the success of Phase 1 of Mohole doomed the project. The many factors that proved fatal to Mohole included the human element, differing views of the engineering and scientific goals, political improprieties at the governmental level, complexities of managing such a large project, and escalating costs. D. S. Greenberg, a reporter for the journal Science commented in 1964, "There is a lengthy and unattractive trail of bickering, bitterness, and shortsightedness, involving some of the leading figures of American science and science administration." The drilling that was to occur in the second phase of the project never took place.

=== Scientific goals ===
Scientists involved with Mohole had differing and irreconcilable views as to the scientific goals of Mohole. Part of this disagreement resulted from a long tradition of competition among the four main oceanographic institutions: Lamont Geological Observatory in New York, the Woods Hole Oceanographic Institution in Massachusetts, the University of Miami in Florida, and the Scripps Institution of Oceanography in California. The competitive nature of these institutions meant that they often refused to cooperate. The East Coast institutions favored a drilling site in the Atlantic Ocean or Caribbean, while Scripps in San Diego favored a North Pacific site. Any site had to be near a large port to make the logistics of the large expedition feasible, it had to have a Moho as shallow as possible, it could not be in a geologically active region, and it had to have stable weather conditions. In January 1965 a site north of Maui, Hawaii, was selected.

A critical dispute was whether Mohole should begin at a modest, conservative pace with a program of drilling shallow bore holes in sediments, or whether it should proceed at once to drill the deep hole to the Moho. The issue was critical since the two approaches required differing engineering, management, and allocation of resources. There was significant interest in a program of shallower holes from those in the oceanographic community and the oil industry. The deeper hole addressed more fundamental questions about the structure of the Earth. Some viewed the more modest initial approach as developing essential engineering and drilling techniques that would later be required for the deep bore hole.

Some in the geology and geophysics communities objected to Mohole because, for its enormous cost, they expected that not much would be learned from drilling. They viewed the project as an engineering stunt of little scientific value.

=== Management ===
During the CUSS I test and shortly thereafter, the Mohole project was managed by the National Academy of Sciences, with AMSOC acting as an advisor. The informal AMSOC group was insufficient to manage what was expected to be a large project in its next phase, and the National Science Foundation (NSF) took over management of the project in late 1961. AMSOC was retained as an advisor to NSF. During late 1961 and early 1962, NSF sought bids from universities and private industry for a prime contractor for Mohole.

Hollis Hedberg, a geologist from Gulf Oil Corporation and professor of geology at Princeton University, chaired the AMSOC Mohole committee from December 1961 to November 1963. Hedberg had significant experience in drilling in the oil fields of Venezuela in the 1940s. Hedberg strongly advocated an initial program for drilling shallower holes, and a second program for drilling to the Moho.

Since many members of AMSOC worked for universities or industries developing bids for Mohole, many of the scientists on AMSOC resigned to avoid conflicts of interest. Bascom and his associates formed a corporation, Ocean Science and Engineering, Inc., expecting that they would continue the work demonstrated in the CUSS I test. Gordon Lill resigned from AMSOC, since his employer was Lockheed and was vying to become the prime contractor. Roger Revelle similarly resigned.

NSF declined a bid from Scripps as prime contractor, leaving it with bids from Socony Mobil Oil Co., Global-Aerojet-Shell, Brown & Root, Zapata Off-shore Co, and General Electric Co. A review panel at NSF rated the Socony Mobil bid the best, calling it "in a class by itself", while further review ranked Global-Aerojet-Shell first, Socony Mobil Oil second, and Brown & Root third. In a decision that was widely viewed as political, NSF selected the construction company Brown & Root as the prime contractor for the project in February 1962. Brown & Root's home in Houston was close to the congressional district of congressman Albert Thomas, chair of the House Appropriations Committee, and according to Shor, it had no experience in hydrocarbon exploration. Brown & Root was also a major political contributor to vice-president Lyndon Johnson.

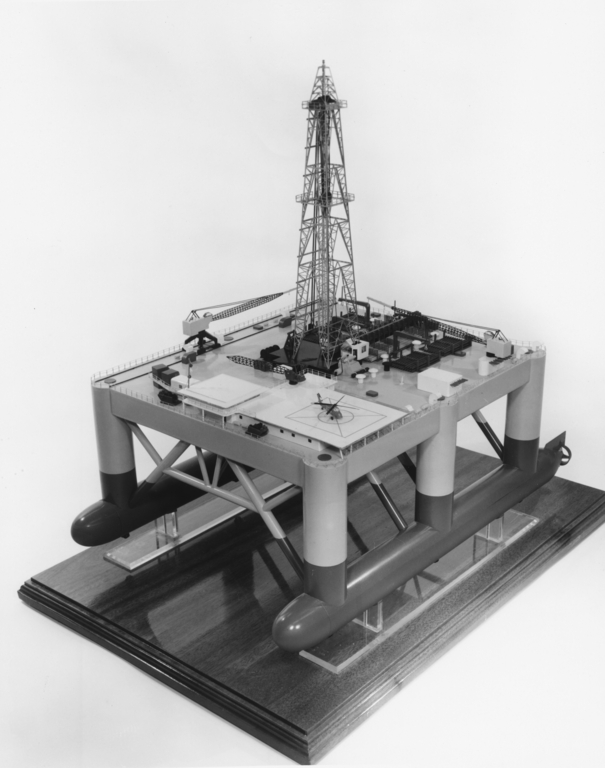
A model of the proposed Mohole drilling platform designed by Brown & Root

Brown & Root proved to be troublesome to the existing Mohole scientists and engineers. To those that had been involved with Mohole, Brown & Root lacked understanding of the scientific goals and the engineering requirements, while maintaining an arrogance in their management of Mohole. Within two months, Bascom and his Ocean Science and Engineering had such a bad relationship with Brown & Root that they quit the drilling engineering effort. Ocean Science and Engineering had reviewed Brown & Root's "Engineering Plan Report" and declared it "neither a clear plan nor a sound basis for proceeding." The contract made clear that the goal of Mohole was to obtain a sample of the Earth's mantle, while many of the AMSOC scientists, such as Hedberg and Ewing, were strongly advocating an intermediate stage of drilling shallow holes in sediments. There were now four managers of Mohole: Brown & Root, AMSOC, the National Science Foundation, and the National Academy of Sciences, and Mohole was suffering from conflicting and poorly-focused engineering and scientific goals.

In November 1963, Hedberg testified during congressional hearings on the Mohole project with a scathing criticism of Mohole purpose and management. He declared, "..this project can readily be one of the greatest and most rewarding scientific ventures ever carried out. I must also say that it can just as readily become instead only a foolish and unjustifiably expensive fiasco if there is not an insistence that it be carried out within a proper concept and in a well-planned, rigorously logical, and scientific manner ...." After the president of the National Academy of Sciences Frederick Seitz reprimanded him for his testimony, Hedberg resigned from AMSOC.

In January 1964, Lill agreed to become the director for Project Mohole at the National Science Foundation, and the American Miscellaneous Society dissolved itself. AMSOC suggested new committees for the scientific aspects of drilling be established at the National Academy of Sciences.

=== Costs ===
Project Mohole attracted criticism that such an expensive project would undermine smaller science projects. The project was a separate appropriation from Congress, however, and did not affect existing science programs.

After the initial Phase 1 success, at relatively modest cost, the project grew in expense. The Brown & Root bid was for $35M plus a fee of $1.8M to manage the project and begin organizing the engineering efforts to build the Mohole drilling platform. These costs did not include those for the drilling ship and the Mohole drilling operation. Privately the AMSOC management committee thought the final deep drill to the Moho would cost about $40M. Bids were solicited to build the drill ship in March 1965. The bids received in July 1965 requested funds of about $125M ($1.28 billion in 2025 dollars). The managers of Project Mohole (AMSOC, Brown & Root, and NSF) were shocked by the increased cost, but decided to continue Mohole. National Steel and Shipbuilding in San Diego was awarded the contract to build the drill ship in September 1965.

At the time of the termination of Project Mohole in 1966, the project had spent $57M.

=== Politics ===
By 1963, numerous articles ridiculing Mohole and its management troubles had appeared in the popular press. An article in Newsweek was entitled "Project No Hole", while another article in Fortune was entitled "How NSF Got Lost in Mohole." There was little public sympathy for Project Mohole.

In 1963, the Congressional Bureau of the Budget wrote to the director of the National Science Foundation Alan Waterman. Highlighting the increasing, uncertain costs, the technical uncertainties, and the "unique administrative problems," the Bureau urged NSF to withhold further financial commitments. In the Fall of 1963 NSF's Senate appropriations committee began hearings on the mismanagement and possible political motivations behind the selection of Brown & Root as primary contractor. The committee deemed the construction of the drilling platform "unwise" and urged no further expenditures. Congressman Thomas was able to reverse this recommendation in conference. The possible political influences on the choice of Brown & Root continued to be revealed.

In February 1966 Representative Thomas, chairman of the House Appropriations Committee and principal supporter of Project Mohole in Congress, died of pancreatic cancer. After his passing Mohole lacked support from the committee, and Congress discontinued the project in 1966. Another factor was that by the mid-1960s the Vietnam War was deemed a greater priority for funding. While the termination of Mohole funding brought an end to the Brown & Root contract for drilling to the Moho, Congress and the National Science Foundation had already begun to support a separate program of shallow sediment drilling.

== Mohole branches to deep and shallow projects ==
Well before the termination of Mohole, academic scientists began to work toward establishing drilling programs independent of Mohole. Their interest was drilling in deep-sea sediments, which the CUSS I test had demonstrated to be both feasible and cost effective. Until this test, oceanographers had only been able to sample the upper 10 m of deep-sea sediment.

In early 1962 Cesare Emiliani from the University of Miami proposed a drilling vessel and program called "LOCO" for "LOng COres". Scientists from the University of Miami, Lamont, Princeton, Woods Hole, and Scripps agreed that such a program was of great interest and that it should be independent of AMSOC and Project Mohole. During this time Revelle sought to have Scripps as prime contractor or administrator of a drilling program. Proposals to NSF to support LOCO were not successful, however, and LOCO dissolved in April 1963.

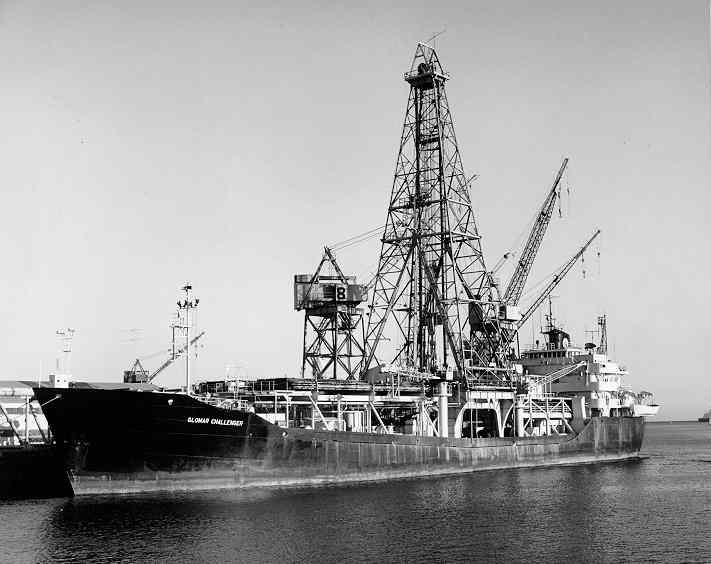
The Glomar Challenger, launched in 1968, was the drill ship for NSF's Deep Sea Drilling Project.

The interested institutions began to coordinate and organize themselves for the project, realizing that a large drilling program could not be supported by one organization. In early 1963 an agreement called CORE for a Consortium for Ocean Research and Exploration was signed by Ewing (Lamont), Brackett Hersey (Woods Hole), and Revelle (Scripps) to carry out a deep-sea sediment drilling program. In September 1963 the new director of NSF Leland Haworth addressed the AMSOC Committee to state that Mohole should consist of two programs, the deep drilling under Brown & Root and a shallow drilling program. Lill expressed similar advice to the leaders of the oceanographic institutions in March 1964, advising the four main institutions to combine their interests into one large drilling project. The principal institutions agreed to form the Joint Oceanographic Institutions Deep Earth Sampling (JOIDES) program in May 1964. This event was the formation of the Deep Sea Drilling Project of the National Science Foundation.

In October 1964 NSF provided a 2-year contract to the University of Miami to begin planning JOIDES. The first drilling expedition under JOIDES was in spring 1965 to the Blake Plateau off the southeastern United States. The expedition was led by Lamont on a borrowed ship Caldrill. In June 1966 Scripps won the prime contract as the operating institution for NSF's Deep Sea Drilling Project. Construction of new dedicated scientific drill ship Glomar Challenger began in 1967, becoming operational in August 1968.

The oil industry was similarly motivated to begin exploration programs of sediments in continental margins. In 1967, on Hedberg's suggestion, Gulf Oil Exploration launched the exploration ship R/V Gulfrex, which operated across the globe until 1975, covering some 160,000 miles (140,000 nautical miles; 260,000 kilometers).

== Legacy ==
Phase One proved that both the technology and expertise were available to drill into the Earth's mantle. It was intended as the experimental phase of the project, and, by developing and employing dynamic positioning of ships during drilling, succeeded in drilling to a depth of 183 m (601 feet) below the sea floor. While Project Mohole was not successful, the idea led to projects such as NSF's Deep Sea Drilling Project, and attempts to drill to extraordinary depths have continued.

The sci-fi Mars novel series has several deep holes in the Martian crust called Moholes. They are deep enough that the hole becomes hot from the mantle and provides heat to the thin Martian atmosphere.

The 1970 Doctor Who serial Inferno, which also deals with a scientific effort to drill into the Earth's crust, was inspired by Project Mohole.

== See also ==
- Ocean Drilling Program
- Integrated Ocean Drilling Program
- International Ocean Discovery Program
- Kola Superdeep Borehole
- Chikyū
