= Scientific drilling =

Method of geologic probing

Scientific drilling into the Earth is a way for scientists to probe the Earth's sediments, crust, and upper mantle. In addition to rock samples, drilling technology can unearth samples of connate fluids and of the subsurface biosphere, mostly microbial life, preserved in drilled samples. Scientific drilling is carried out on land by the International Continental Scientific Drilling Program (ICDP) and at sea by the Integrated Ocean Drilling Program (IODP). Scientific drilling on the continents includes drilling down into solid ground as well as drilling from small boats on lakes. Sampling thick glaciers and ice sheets to obtain ice cores is related but will not be described further here.

Like probes sent into outer space, scientific drilling is a technology used to obtain samples from places that people cannot reach. Human beings have descended as deep as 2,212 m (7,257 ft) in Veryovkina Cave, the world's deepest known cave, located in the Caucasus Mountains of the country of Georgia. Gold miners in South Africa regularly go deeper than 3,400 m, but no human has ever descended to greater depths than this below the Earth's solid surface. As depth increases into the Earth, temperature and pressure rise. Temperatures in the crust increase about 15 °C per kilometer, making it impossible for humans to exist at depths greater than several kilometers, even if it was somehow possible to keep shafts open in spite of the tremendous pressure.

Scientific drilling is interdisciplinary and international in scope. Individual scientists cannot generally undertake scientific drilling projects alone. Teamwork between scientists, engineers, and administrators is often required for success in planning and in carrying out a drilling project, analyzing the samples, and interpreting and publishing the results in scientific journals.

== Purposes ==
Scientific drilling is used to address a wide range of problems, which cannot be addressed using rocks exposed on the surface or the seafloor. The Integrated Ocean Drilling Program has a broad set of research objectives, which can be divided into three principal themes:

1. The nature of the deep biosphere and the oceanic sub-seafloor
2. Understanding environmental change, processes and effects
3. Cycles and geodynamics of the solid Earth

ICDP focuses on scientific drilling to address the following questions about the history, chemistry, and physics of Earth and the biosphere:

1. What are the physical and chemical processes responsible for earthquakes and volcanic eruptions, and what are the best ways to minimize their effects?
2. How has Earth's climate changed in the recent past and what are the reasons for such changes?
3. What have been the effects of meteorite impacts (bolides) on climate and mass extinctions of life?
4. What is the nature of the deep biosphere and its relation to geologic processes such as hydrocarbon maturation, ore deposition and evolution of life on Earth?
5. What are the ways to safely dispose of radioactive and other toxic waste materials?
6. How do sedimentary basins and fossil fuel resources originate and evolve?
7. How do mineral, and metal ore deposits form?
8. What are the fundamental physics of plate tectonics and heat, mass, and fluid transfer through Earth's crust?
9. How can people better interpret geophysical data used to determine the structure and properties of Earth's crust?

== Deepest drillings ==
The Kola Superdeep Borehole on the Kola peninsula of Russia reached 12,262 metres (40,230 ft) and is the deepest penetration of the Earth's solid surface. The German Continental Deep Drilling Program at 9.1 kilometres (5.7 mi) has shown the earth crust to be mostly porous. Drillings as deep as 2.1 kilometres (1.3 mi) into the seafloor were achieved at DSDP/ODP/IODP Hole 504B. Because the continental crust is about 45 km thick on average, whereas oceanic crust is 6–7 km thick, deep drillings have penetrated only the upper 25-30% of both crusts.

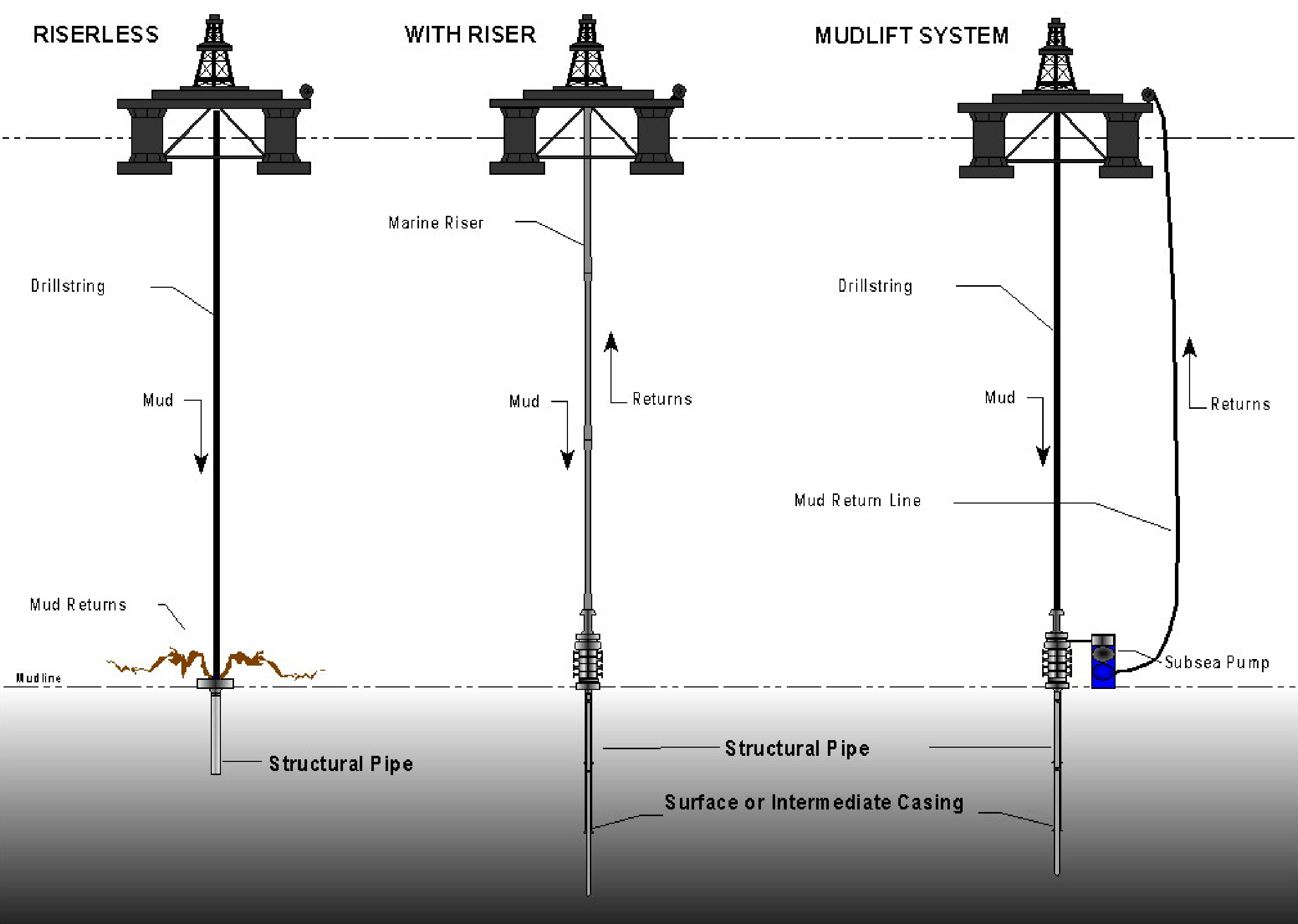
Riserless and mudlift drilling

== Ocean drilling ==
The drillship that has been used for the past 20 and more years, the JOIDES Resolution, drills without a riser. Riser-less drilling uses seawater as its primary drilling fluid, which is pumped down through the drill pipe. This cleans and cools the drill bit and lifts cuttings out of the hole, piling them in a cone around the hole. Japan's new drillship, the Chikyu, uses a riser for drilling. The riser system includes an outer casing that surrounds the drill pipe, to provide return-circulation of drilling fluid for maintaining pressure balance within the borehole. A blowout preventer (BOP) protects the vessel and the environment from any unexpected release of gas and oil. This technology is necessary for drilling several thousand meters into the Earth.
