= Mohorovičić discontinuity =

Boundary between the Earth's crust and the mantle

Earth's crust and mantle, Moho discontinuity between bottom of crust and solid uppermost mantle

The Mohorovičić discontinuity (/ˌmoʊhəˈroʊvɪtʃɪtʃ/ MOH-hə-ROH-vih-chitch; Croatian: [moxorôʋiːtʃitɕ]), usually called the Moho discontinuity, Moho boundary, or just Moho, is the boundary between the crust and the mantle of Earth. It is defined by the distinct change in velocity of seismic waves as they pass through changing densities of rock.

The Moho lies almost entirely within the lithosphere (the hard outer layer of the Earth, including the crust). Only beneath mid-ocean ridges does it define the lithosphere–asthenosphere boundary (the depth at which the mantle becomes significantly ductile). The Mohorovičić discontinuity is 5 to 10 kilometres (3–6 mi) below the ocean floor, and 20 to 90 kilometres (10–60 mi) beneath typical continental crusts, with an average of 35 kilometres (22 mi).

Named after the pioneering Croatian seismologist Andrija Mohorovičić, the Moho separates both the oceanic crust and continental crust from the underlying mantle. The Mohorovičić discontinuity was first identified in 1909 by Mohorovičić, when he observed that seismograms from shallow-focus earthquakes had two sets of P-waves and S-waves, one set that followed a direct path near the Earth's surface and the other refracted by a high-velocity medium.

== Nature and seismology ==
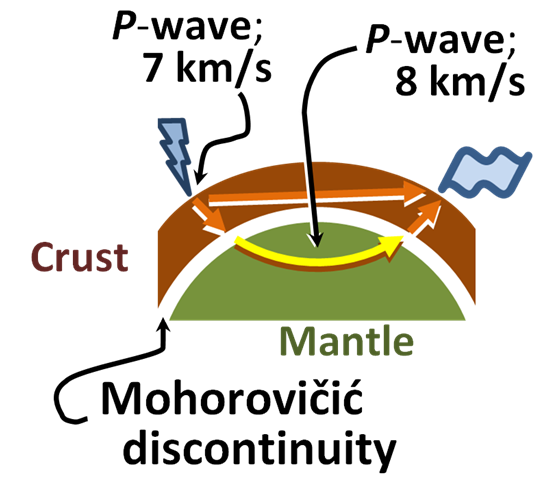
Two paths of a P-wave, one direct and one refracted as it crosses the Moho

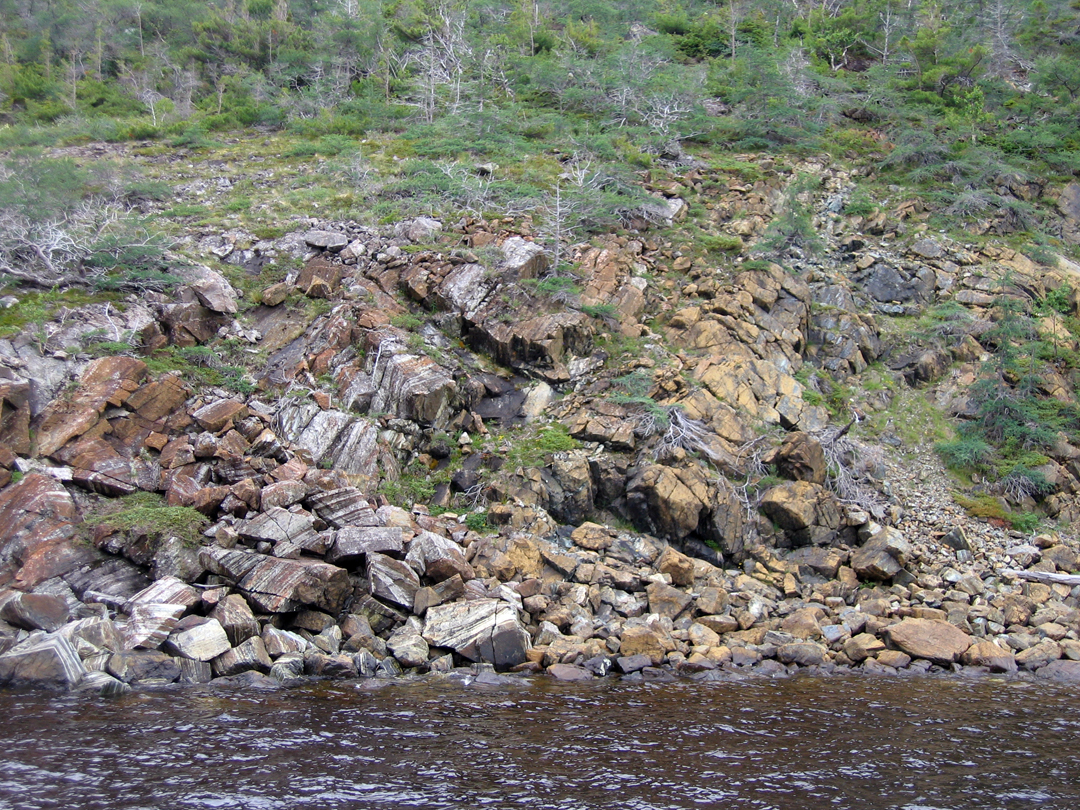
Ordovician ophiolite in Gros Morne National Park, Newfoundland. This rock, which formed the Ordovician Moho, is exposed on the surface.

The Moho marks the transition in composition between the Earth's crust and the lithospheric mantle. Immediately above the Moho, the velocities of primary seismic waves (P-waves) are consistent with those through basalt (6.7–7.2 km/s), and below they are similar to those through peridotite or dunite (7.6–8.6 km/s). This increase of approximately 1 km/s corresponds to a distinct change in material as the waves pass through the Earth, and is commonly accepted as the lower limit of the Earth's crust. The Moho is characterized by a transition zone of up to 500 meters. Ancient Moho zones are exposed above-ground in numerous ophiolites around the world.

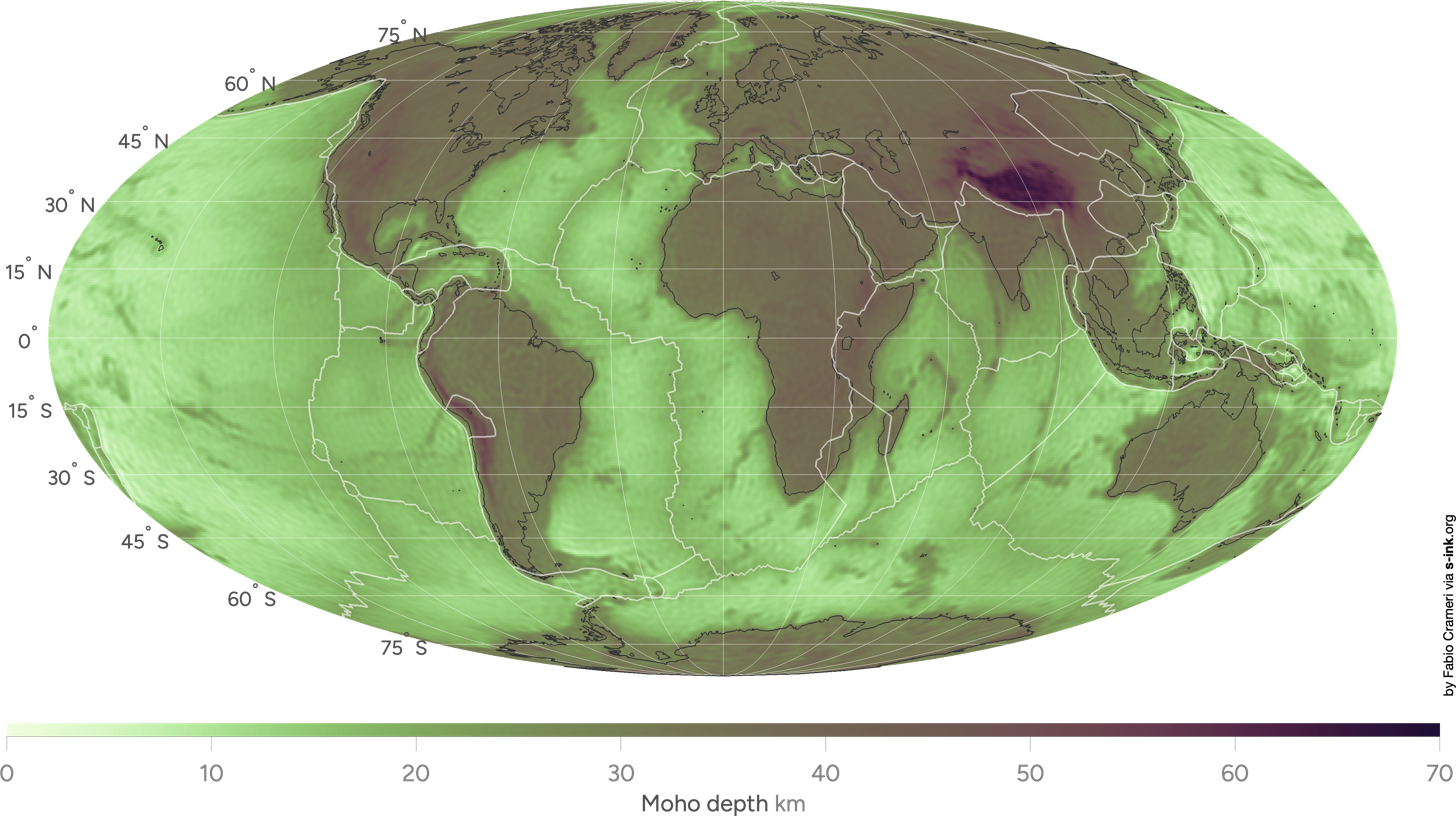
As shown in the figure, the Moho maintains a relatively stable average depth of 10 km under the ocean sea floor, but can vary by more than 70 km below continental land masses.

Beginning in the 1980s, geologists became aware that the Moho does not always coincide with the crust-mantle boundary defined by composition. Xenoliths (lower crust and upper mantle rock brought to the surface by volcanic eruptions) and seismic-reflection data showed that, away from continental cratons, the transition between crust and mantle is marked by basaltic intrusions and may be up to 20 km thick. The Moho may lie well below the crust-mantle boundary and care must be used in interpreting the structure of the crust from seismic data alone. Precise mapping of the Moho is determined "through the utilization of gravimetric-isostatic methodologies and gravity data in conjunction with the seismic techniques."

Serpentinization of mantle rock below slowly spreading mid-ocean ridges can also increase the depth to the Moho, since serpentinization lowers seismic wave velocities.

== History ==
Croatian seismologist Andrija Mohorovičić is credited with discovering and defining the Moho. In 1909, he was examining data from a local earthquake in Zagreb when he observed two distinct sets of P-waves and S-waves propagating out from the focus of the earthquake. Mohorovičić knew that waves caused by earthquakes travel at velocities proportional to the density of the material carrying them. As a result of this information, he theorized that the second set of waves could only be caused by a sharp transition in density in the Earth's crust, which could account for such a dramatic change in wave velocity. Using velocity data from the earthquake, he was able to calculate the depth of the Moho to be approximately 54 km, which was supported by subsequent seismological studies.

The Moho has played a large role in the fields of geology and earth science for well over a century. By observing the Moho's refractive nature and how it affects the speed of P-waves, scientists were able to theorize about the earth's composition. These early studies gave rise to modern seismology.

In the early 1960s, Project Mohole was an attempt to drill to the Moho from deep-ocean regions. After initial success in establishing deep-ocean drilling, the project suffered from political and scientific opposition, mismanagement, and cost overruns, and it was cancelled in 1966.

== Exploration ==
Reaching the discontinuity by drilling remains an important scientific objective. Soviet scientists at the Kola Superdeep Borehole pursued the goal from 1970 until 1992. They reached a depth of 12,260 metres (40,220 ft), the world's deepest hole, before abandoning the project. One proposal considers a rock-melting radionuclide-powered capsule with a heavy tungsten needle that can propel itself down to the Moho discontinuity and explore Earth's interior near it and in the upper mantle. The Japanese project Chikyu Hakken ("Earth Discovery") also aims to explore in this general area with the drilling ship, Chikyū, built for the Integrated Ocean Drilling Program (IODP).

Plans called for the drill-ship JOIDES Resolution to sail from Colombo in Sri Lanka in late 2015 and to head for the Atlantis Bank, a promising location in the southwestern Indian Ocean on the Southwest Indian Ridge, to attempt to drill an initial bore hole to a depth of approximately 1.5 kilometres. The attempt did not even reach 1.3 km, but researchers hope to further their investigations at a later date.

== See also ==
- Brittle–ductile transition zone – Strongest part of the Earth's crust
- Core–mantle boundary – Discontinuity where the bottom of the planet's mantle meets the outer layer of the core
- Isostasy
- Lehmann discontinuity – Geologic boundary
- Gutenberg discontinuity
