= Chikyū =

Japanese drill ship

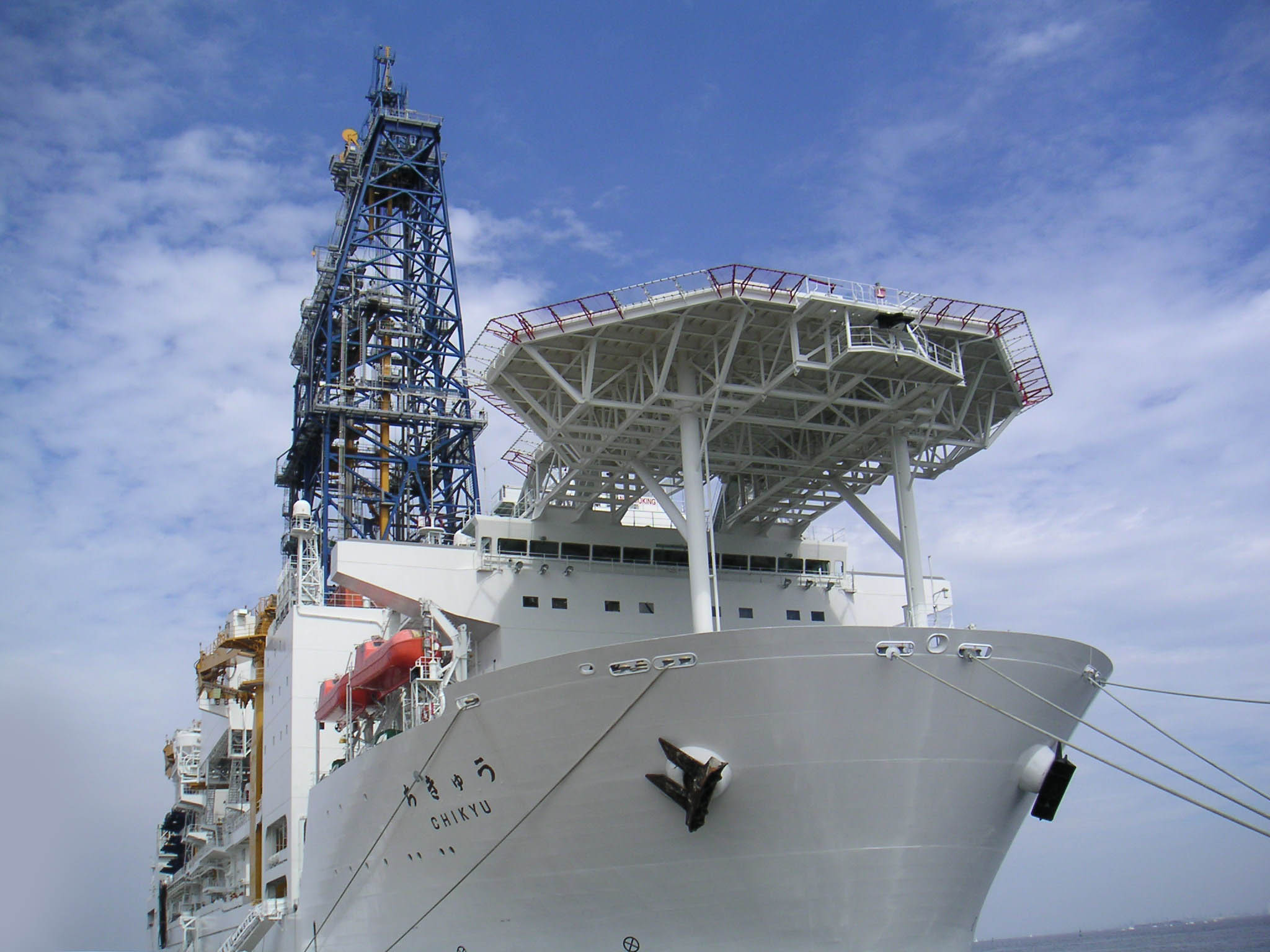
- Chikyū

History

Japan
- Name: Chikyū (ちきゅう)
- Namesake: Japanese word for "Earth"
- Owner: CDEX
- Operator: CDEX
- Port of registry: (Japan) Yokosuka
- Builder: Mitsui Engineering & Shipbuilding and Mitsubishi Heavy Industries
- Cost: 60 billion yen
- Laid down: 25 April 2001
- Launched: 18 January 2002
- Acquired: 29 July 2005
- Home port: Yokosuka, Kanagawa
- Identification: IMO number: 9234044; MMSI number: 432522000; Callsign: JRAJ

General characteristics
- Class & type: NK (Nippon Kaiji Kyokai)
- Type: Ocean-going Drill ship
- Displacement: 57,087 tonnes (62,928 tons)
- Length: 210 m (690 ft)
- Beam: 38 m (125 ft)
- Height: 130 m (430 ft)
- Draft: 9.2 m (30 ft)
- Depth: 16.2 m (53 ft)
- Propulsion: 1 × 2,550 kW side thruster; 6 × 4,100 kW azimuth thrusters
- Speed: 12 knots (22 km/h; 14 mph)
- Range: 14,800 nmi (27,400 km; 17,000 mi)
- Complement: 200
- Crew: 100

Chikyū (ちきゅう) is a Japanese scientific drilling ship built for the Integrated Ocean Drilling Program (IODP). The vessel is designed to ultimately drill 7 km (4.3 miles) beneath the seabed, where the Earth's crust is much thinner, and into the Earth's mantle, deeper than any other hole drilled in the ocean thus far.

While the planned depth of the hole is significantly less than the Russian Kola Superdeep Borehole (which reached 12 km or 7.5 miles depth on land), the scientific results are expected to be much more interesting since the regions targeted by Chikyū include some of the most seismically active regions of the world. Other deep holes have been drilled by the drill ship JOIDES Resolution during the Deep Sea Drilling Project and the Ocean Drilling Program.

== Operation ==
The Japanese part of the IODP program is called Chikyū Hakken (地球発見, Chikyū Hakken), Japanese for "Earth Discovery". Chikyū is operated by the Centre for Deep Earth Research (CDEX), a subdivision of the Japan Agency for Marine-Earth Science and Technology (JAMSTEC). JAMSTEC also operates the DSV Shinkai 6500, Earth Simulator supercomputer and other marine scientific research projects. CDEX is responsible for the services to support activities including on-board staffing, data management for core samples and logging; implements engineering site surveys; and conducts engineering developments. CDEX contracts with Mantle Quest Japan Company Ltd. for the navigation of the ship.

The Chikyū Hakken program is part of an international scientific collaborative effort with scientists from the United States, ECORD, a consortium consisting of several European countries and Canada, China, South Korea, Australia and New Zealand (ANZIC), and India.

In January 2026, Chikyū was deployed near Minamitorishima island in Japan's Pacific exclusive economic zone to conduct the first trial extraction of rare earth-rich mud from approximately 6,000 metres below the sea surface, according to the Japan Agency for Marine-Earth Science and Technology (JAMSTEC). The three-week mission concluded on 14 February 2026 and targeted approximately 35 tonnes of seabed mud, each tonne estimated to contain around two kilograms of rare earth elements. The mission was part of Japan's Cross-ministerial Strategic Innovation Promotion Program(SIP) and aimed at reducing Japan's reliance on Chinese rare earth imports, according to The Japan Times.

== Design ==
D/V Chikyū was built by Mitsui Engineering & Shipbuilding and launched on 18 January 2002 in Nagasaki, Nagasaki. The ship was outfitted by Mitsubishi Heavy Industries and delivered to JAMSTEC on 29 July 2005.

The hull of the ship is 210 m (690 feet) long, 38 m (125 feet) in width, 16.2 m (53 feet) high, and has an approximate gross tonnage of about 57,000 tonnes (63,000 tons). The ship has a draft of 9.2 m (30 feet) and a maximum cruising speed of 12 knots (22 km/h; 14 mph). The amidships derrick is 121 m (397 feet) above sea level, and the top drive has a lifting capacity of 1,000 tonnes (1,100 tons). Its complement of 150 crew are divided between 100 operators and 50 science personnel, with at sea crew changes handled by helicopter transfer.

Key innovations include a GPS system and six adjustable computer controlled azimuth thrusters (3.8 m or 12 feet in diameter) that enable precise positioning to maintain a stable platform during deep water drilling. The maximum drilling water depth for riser drilling is 2,500 m (8,200 feet) and can support a drill string up to 10,000 m (33,000 feet) long.

The helipad can serve very large helicopters transporting as many as 30 persons per landing.

== History ==
The D/V Chikyū was built for deep-sea geological scientific research, which now includes not only research of earthquake-generating zones in the Earth's crust but also hydrothermal vents and subsea methane hydrate research.

On 16 November 2007 Chikyū began drilling the Nankai Trough Seismogenic Zone Experiments (NanTroSEIZE) transect as planned, reaching 1,400 m (4,600 feet) at the site of a future deep subsea floor observatory. The first stage of four NanTroSEIZE Stages was completed in February 2008. The whole project was envisioned to be completed by 2012.

The ship was damaged by the 2011 Tōhoku earthquake and tsunami on 11 March 2011. The ship was moored in the port of Hachinohe, Aomori. The tsunami wave pushed the Chikyu over the pier and the vessel sustained some damage. One of the six thrusters, No.5, was damaged and a 1.5-meter (4.9 ft) hole was made in the bottom. Local preliminary school children who were visiting the ship at the time of the earthquake spent one night on board and were rescued by Japan Self-Defense Forces helicopters next day. The ship was repaired at a dock in Yokohama (Mitsubishi Heavy Industries) and returned to service in June 2011.

In January 2026, Chikyū will be participating in seabed mining tests off the coast of Minamitorishima, the easternmost island in Japan. Initial tests seek to process approximately 35 tonnes of material. Each tonne will contain roughly 2 kilos of rare earth metals. If successful, these technologies will increase Japanese access to rare-earth metals

== World record ==
On September 21st, 2024, the Chikyū achieved a Guinness World Record for the deepest scientific ocean drilling during the International Ocean Discovery Program (IODP) Expedition 405 with a total drill pipe length of 7,906 meters. This was the final expedition of the IODP which was a joint operation between the United States and Europe. The IODP has now ended after 58 total expeditions. It will be replaced by a joint European/Japanese effort called the International Ocean Drilling Programme (IODP^{3}).

== In popular culture ==
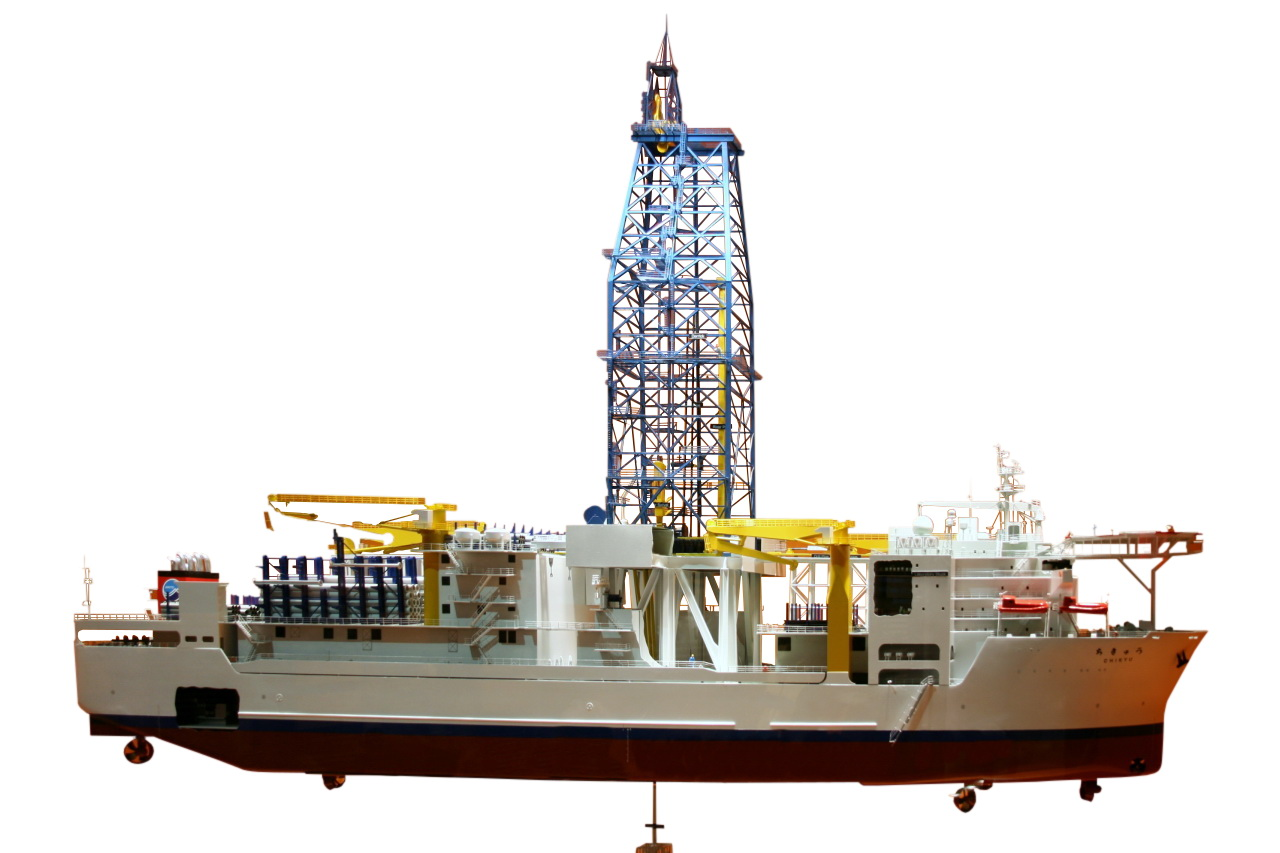
Chikyū 1:100 scale model at the Smithsonian's National Museum of Natural History

The D/V Chikyū is featured and plays a pivotal role in the 2006 film Sinking of Japan.

== See also ==
- Scientific drilling program
  - Project Mohole
  - Kola Superdeep Borehole
  - Ocean Drilling Program
  - German Continental Deep Drilling Program
  - San Andreas Fault Observatory at Depth
  - Integrated Ocean Drilling Program
- Scientific drilling ships
  - JOIDES Resolution
  - Glomar Challenger
- Mohorovičić discontinuity
- Earthscope
- USARRAY
