= Glomar Challenger Basin =

Body of water in Victoria Land, Antarctica

Glomar Challenger Basin (77°45′S 180°0′E) is a northeast trending undersea basin in the central Ross Sea continental shelf named for the research ship Glomar Challenger. The name was approved by the Advisory Committee for Undersea Features in June 1988.
