= Glomar Challenger =

American research drilling ship

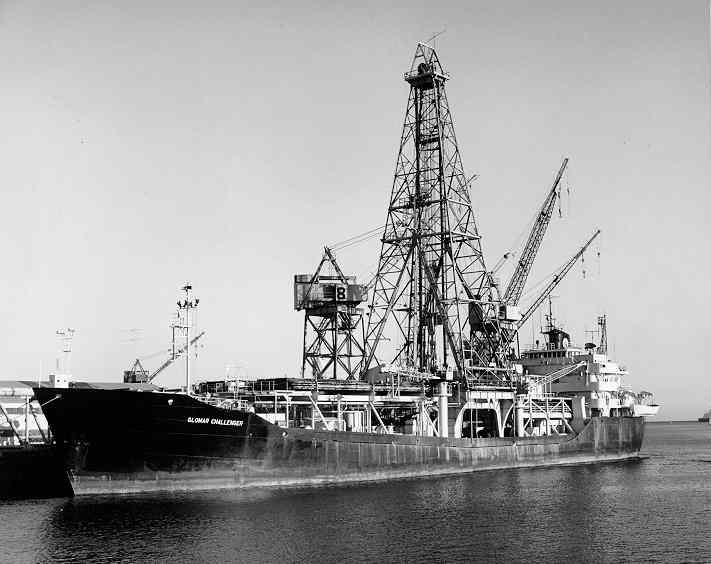
- Glomar Challenger

History

United States
- Name: Glomar Challenger
- Owner: Global Marine Inc.
- Builder: Levingston Shipbuilding Company, Orange, Texas
- Laid down: October 18, 1967
- Launched: March 23, 1968
- Acquired: August 11, 1968
- In service: 1968
- Out of service: 1983
- Identification: IMO number: 6904636
- Fate: Scrapped, c. 1983 in NYC Shipyard

General characteristics
- Type: Deep sea drilling platform
- Length: 400 ft (120 m)
- Beam: 65 ft (20 m)
- Draft: 20 ft (6.1 m)
- Speed: 12 knots (22 km/h; 14 mph)
- Endurance: 90 days
- Sensors & processing systems: ITT Model 4007AB Satellite Navigation System
- Notes: Could drill to a depth of 22,500 ft (6,900 m), in a water depth of up to 20,000 ft (6,100 m).

The Glomar Challenger was a deep-sea research and scientific drilling vessel designed for oceanography and marine geology studies. It was used in the Deep Sea Drilling Project for obtaining sediment cores from the ocean floor.

The drillship was designed, owned, and operated by Global Marine Incorporated (now Transocean) specifically for a long-term contract with the American National Science Foundation and University of California Scripps Institution of Oceanography. It was built by Levingston Shipbuilding Company in Orange, Texas, and launched on March 23, 1968.

Glomar is a truncation of Global Marine, while the name Glomar Challenger is a tribute to the 19th-century oceanographic survey vessel HMS Challenger.

== Purpose ==
The Glomar Challenger was built to help Harry Hess test the theory of seafloor spreading, which predicts that the age of rock samples increases with distance from the mid-ocean ridge.

== Accomplishments ==
Starting from August 1968, the ship was embarked on a 15-year-long scientific expedition, the Deep Sea Drilling Project, criss-crossing the Mid-Atlantic Ridge between South America and Africa and drilling core samples at specific locations. When the age of the samples was determined by paleontologic and isotopic dating studies, this provided conclusive evidence for the seafloor spreading hypothesis, and, consequently, for plate tectonics.

During 1970, when doing research in the Mediterranean Sea while supervised by Kenneth Hsu, geologists aboard the vessel brought up drill cores containing gypsum, anhydrite, rock salt, and various other evaporite minerals that often form from drying of brine or seawater. These were the first solid evidence for the ancient desiccation of the Mediterranean Sea, the Messinian salinity crisis.

== Fate and legacy ==
In November 1983, after 15 years in operation, the Glomar Challenger's active duty ended, and she was later scrapped. Her successor, JOIDES Resolution, was launched in 1985.

== See also ==
- Glomar Explorer
- Integrated Ocean Drilling Program
- Ocean Drilling Program
- Glomar Challenger Basin
- Scientific drilling
- Offshore drilling
- Continental drift
- List of research vessels by country
