= JOIDES Basin =

Undersea basin of the central Ross continental shelf

Coordinates: 74°30′S 174°0′E

JOIDES Basin is a northeast trending undersea basin of the central Ross continental shelf. It was named for the "Joint Oceanographic Institutes Deep Earth Sampling" project, the name being approved by the Advisory Committee for Undersea Features in June 1988.
