= Deep Sea Drilling Project =

Ocean drilling research program between 1968–1983

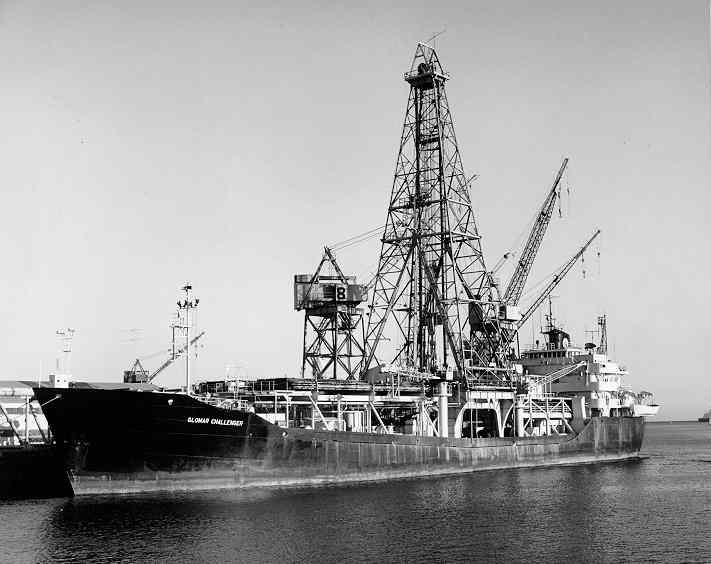
Glomar Challenger

The Deep Sea Drilling Project (DSDP) was an ocean drilling project operated from 1968 to 1983. The program was a success, as evidenced by the data and publications that have resulted from it. The data are now hosted by Texas A&M University, although the program was coordinated by the Scripps Institution of Oceanography at the University of California, San Diego. DSDP provided crucial data to support the seafloor spreading hypothesis and helped to prove the theory of plate tectonics. DSDP was the first of three international scientific ocean drilling programs that have operated over more than 40 years. It was followed by the Ocean Drilling Program (ODP) in 1985, the Integrated Ocean Drilling Program in 2004 and the International Ocean Discovery Program in 2013.

== History ==
The initial contract between the National Science Foundation (NSF) and the Regents of the University of California was signed on June 24, 1966. This contract initiated the first phase of the DSDP, which was based in Scripps Institution of Oceanography at the University of California, San Diego. Global Marine, Inc. conducted the drilling operations. The Levingston Shipbuilding Company laid the keel of the Glomar Challenger on October 18, 1967, in Orange, Texas. It sailed down the Sabine River to the Gulf of Mexico, and after a period of testing, DSDP accepted the ship on August 11, 1968.

Through contracts with Joint Oceanographic Institutions (JOI), NSF supported the scientific advisory structure for the project and funded pre-drilling geophysical site surveys. Scientific planning was conducted under the auspices of the Joint Oceanographic Institutions for Deep Earth Sampling (JOIDES). The JOIDES advisory group consisted of 250 distinguished scientists from academic institutions, government agencies, and private industry from all over the world. Over the next 30 months, the second phase consisted of drilling and coring in the Atlantic, Pacific, and Indian Ocean as well as the Mediterranean and Red Sea. Technical and scientific reports followed during the period. The second phase of DSDP ended on August 11, 1972.

The success of the Glomar Challenger was almost immediate. On one of the sites with a water depth of 1,067 m (3,501 feet), core samples revealed the existence of salt domes. Oil companies received samples after an agreement to publish their analysis. The potential of oil beneath deep ocean salt domes remains an important avenue for commercial development today.

As for the purpose of the scientific exploration, one of the most important discoveries was made when the crew drilled 17 holes at 10 different locations along an oceanic ridge between South America and Africa. The retrieved core samples provided strong proof for continental drift and seafloor renewal at rift zones. This confirmation of Alfred Wegener's theory of continental drift strengthened the proposal of a single, ancient land mass, which is called Pangaea. The samples gave further evidence to support the plate tectonics theory, which at the time attempted to explain the formation of mountain ranges, earthquakes, and oceanic trenches. Another discovery was how youthful the ocean floor is in comparison to Earth's geologic history. After analysis of samples, scientists concluded that the ocean floor is probably no older than 200 million years. This is in comparison with the 4.5 billion-year age of the Earth.

The International Phase of Ocean Drilling (IPOD) began in 1975 with the Federal Republic of Germany, Japan, the United Kingdom, the Soviet Union, and France joining the United States in field work aboard the Glomar Challenger and in post-cruise scientific research. The Glomar Challenger docked for the last time with DSDP in November 1983. Parts of the ship, such as its dynamic positioning system, engine telegraph, and thruster console, are stored at the Smithsonian Institution in Washington, D.C. With the advent of larger and more advanced drilling ships, the JOIDES Resolution replaced the Glomar Challenger in January 1985. The new program, called the Ocean Drilling Program (ODP), continued exploration from 1985 to 2003, at which point it was replaced by the Integrated Ocean Drilling Program (IODP).

== Coring operations ==
Although itself a remarkable engineering accomplishment, the Glomar Challenger saw many advances in deep-ocean drilling. One problem solved involved the replacement of worn drill bits. A length of pipe suspended from the ship down to the bottom of the sea might have been as long as 6,243 m (20,483 feet). The maximum depth penetrated through the ocean bottom could have been as great as 1,299 m (4,262 feet). To replace the bit, the drill string must be raised, a new bit attached, and the string remade down to the bottom. However, the crew had to thread this string back into the same drill hole. The technique for this formidable task was accomplished on June 14, 1970, in the Atlantic Ocean in 3,000 m (10,000 feet) of water off the coast of New York. This re-entry was accomplished with the use of sonar scanning equipment and a re-entry cone that had a diameter of 5 m (16 feet) and height of 4.5 m (14 feet).

One major technological advance was the extended use of the holes after drilling. Geophysical and geochemical measurements were made during and after drilling, and occasionally long-term seismic monitoring devices were installed in the holes. This extended understanding of the dynamic processes involved in plate tectonics. Another technological advance involved the introduction of the hydraulic piston corer (HPC) in 1979, which permitted the recovery of virtually undisturbed cores of sediment. This greatly enhanced the ability of scientists to study ancient ocean environments.

From August 11, 1968, to November 11, 1983, the Glomar Challenger achieved the following accomplishments:

Total distance penetrated below the seafloor	325,548 m (1,068,071 feet)
Total interval cored	170,043 m (557,884 feet)
Total core recovered and stored	97,056 m (318,425 feet)
Overall core recovery	57%
Number of cores recovered	19,119
Number of sites investigated	624
Number of expeditions completed	96
Deepest penetration beneath the ocean floor	1,741 m (5,712 feet)
Maximum penetration into basaltic crust	1,080 m (3,540 feet)
Deepest water	7,044 m (23,110 feet)
Total distance traveled	375,632 nautical miles (695,670 km)

== Core samples, publications, and data ==
The ship retrieved core samples in 9-meter-long (30 ft) cores with a diameter of 6.5 cm (2.5 inches). These cores are currently stored at three repositories in the US, Germany, and Japan. One half of each core is called the archive half and is preserved for future use. The working half of each core is used to provide samples for ongoing scientific research.

The scientific results were published as the "Initial Reports of the Deep Sea Drilling Project", which contains the results of studies of the recovered core material and the associated geophysical information from the expeditions from 1968 to 1983. These reports describe the core materials and scientific data obtained at sea and in shore-based laboratories post-cruise. These volumes were originally prepared for NSF under contract by the University of California, Scripps Institution of Oceanography. In 2007, the printed books were scanned and prepared for electronic presentation by the Texas A&M University College of Geosciences.

=== Discovery and accomplishment in Antarctic region ===
DSDP completed four drilling programs; Legs 28, 29, 35 and 36 around Antarctica during four Austral summers, 1972–73, 1973–74, 1974–75 and 1975–76. These programs were focused on two main objectives: Cenozoic global paleoclimatic changes and plate tectonic movements around Antarctica. There were a total of 15 wells drilled around the Antarctic continent, including 4 wells in the Ross Sea, 5 wells on the continental margins, 2 wells in the abyssal plain and 4 wells across the SE Indian Ridge, among which the Site 270 was drilled at the highest latitude (77° 26.45′ S). (Note: Figure 1 shows Sites 324 and 325 drilled on continental rise. They are included in the text of 5 wells on the continental margins.) Analyses of data collected from the drilling accomplish the following results:

==== Sea floor spreading ====
Prior to the deep sea drilling program, the ages of the oceanic basalt were estimated based on magnetic lineations generated at the spreading center as the sea floor pulled apart. Sediments immediately overlying the basalt should have ages similar to the age of magnetic stripes. This is confirmed by the micropaleontologic analyses of the basal sediments sampled above the penetrated basalts. These analyses furthermore substantiate that Australia was separated from Antarctic 85 Mya [million years ago] (Note: At Site 325 the magnetic anomalies, basement depth, and fossils all suggest a late Oligocene basement age.)

==== Inception of Antarctic ice cap ====
Based on paleo-soil study, the Ross shelf began to sink below sea-level about 25 Mya in the Oligocene. This suggests that Antarctic glaciers already advanced to the Ross Sea shelf. This age is consistent with the dating of the shallow unconformity seen on the seismic profiles. The unconformity was attributed to the glacier erosion when advancing to the coastal area. Development of the Circum Antarctic Current was also initiated in the Oligocene. In addition, drilling onshore around the Ross Sea and on the Antarctic Peninsular also confirms that Antarctic ice sheet already existed at least since the Oligocene.

==== Ice-rafted debris ====
The occurrence of ice-rafted debris in marine sediments is an indication of icebergs' presence. Hence the earliest occurrence in the high latitudes could possibly reveal the inception of sea-level glaciations. It should be pointed out that there are factors influencing the distribution of ice-rafted debris, such as ocean currents, and sea water near surface temperatures. Hence the earliest occurrence should be considered as the minimum age of ice rafting at sample locations. Investigations of ice-rafted debris reasonably conclude that the Antarctic ice sheet was initiated at least 25 Mya and cumulated at about 4.5 Mya, as evidenced by ice-rafted debris reaching farthest away from the continent (Note: Cores from the four Leg 35 sites were studied for evidence of ice-rafted debris in the form of small dropstones and quartz grains with distinctive microscopic surface textures suggestive of glacial transport.) (Note: Glaciation in Antarctica was weak in the earliest Miocene, moderate by the middle Miocene, extensive by about late middle Miocene, and probably full by sometime during the late Miocene.) (Note: The glaciation of West Antarctica may have begun in the Eocene, but it was certainly underway by the Miocene. Interpretation of the sediments cored suggests that Antarctic glaciation was weak in the early Miocene, moderate by middle Miocene, extensive by late middle Miocene, and fully developed by sometime in the late Miocene. The intensity of glaciation subsequently declined, with several fluctuations, during the Pliocene and the Quaternary to its present moderate to extensive state.)

This interpretation of Antarctic glaciation history based on marine sediments was subsequently supported by the onshore study of the Antarctic Peninsular and by the coring results around McMurdo Ice Shelf.

==== Paleoclimate ====
Micropaleontologic data from deep sea sediments around the Antarctic continental margin indicate that since at least the late Oligocene-early Miocene, surface waters were relatively cool. With the continued cooling trend, the cold water mass gradually expanded northward until early Pliocene during which an intensified cooling episode resulted in a temperature minimum as evidenced by the northward shift of the silica/carbonate facies boundary. This deduction is similar to the conclusion based on ice-rated debris studies.

Surface temperatures inferred from the oxygen and carbon isotope analyses of both benthonic and planktonic foraminifera in high-latitude marine sediments show a general continuous cooling since early Eocene with a significant temperature drop at the Oligocene/Eocene boundary. This surface water temperature appears to indicate that Antarctic ice sheet probable at this time already reached to the coast. Glaciers on the continent at higher altitudes, however, may have started to grow since the early Eocene. This conclusion is in consistence with other reports documented above.

== See also ==
- Project Mohole
- Ocean Drilling Program
- Integrated Ocean Drilling Program
- Glomar Challenger
