= Ocean Drilling Program =

Marine research program between 1985–2003

The Ocean Drilling Program (ODP) was part of an international project to explore and study the composition and structure of Earth's oceanic basins. This collaborative effort spanned multiple decades and produced comprehensive data that improved understanding of oceanic processes and advanced several fields in Earth science.

== Ocean Drilling History ==
Ocean drilling first began with Project Mohole, a United States effort to drill into Earth's crust in 1957. At the time, there was little scientific understanding about oceanic and geologic processes, such as a lack of knowledge of plate tectonics. While this project was brief due to a lack of funding, it gave insights into these processes and sparked public interest in ocean drilling and its associated discoveries.

Following this preliminary project, several countries came together to contribute to a series of three ocean drilling projects that took place over forty years.

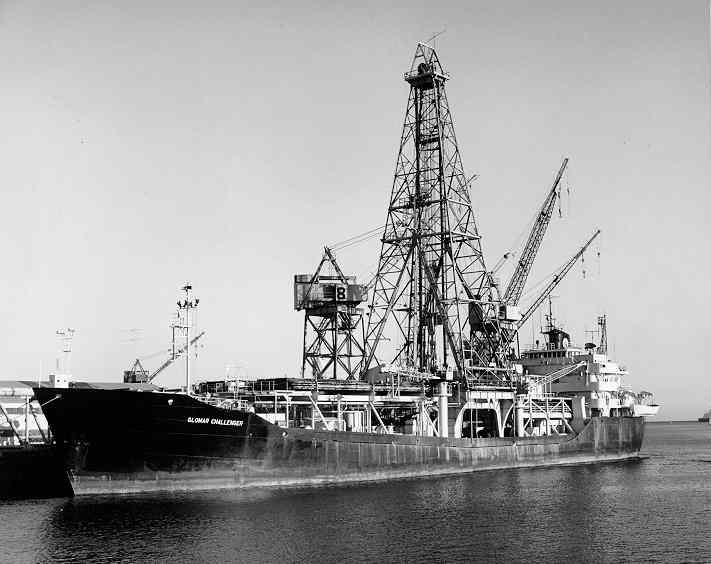
Glomar Challenger, ship used in DSDP

First was the Deep Sea Drilling Project (DSDP), which took place from 1968-1983. This project was driven by the Joint Oceanographic Institutions for Deep Earth Sampling (JOIDES), a partnership of United States research institutions and universities, which included Lamont-Doherty Earth Observatory, the Institute for Marine Sciences at the University of Miami, Scripps Institution of Oceanography, and Woods Hole Oceanographic Institution. The DSDP was an exploratory project that utilized certain technological advances, such as the hydraulic piston corer, and led to further hypotheses about oceanic processes.

The ODP immediately followed the DSDP from 1984-2003.

The final program was the Integrated Ocean Drilling Program (IODP), which was completed in 2013. These projects were an international effort, including Australia, Canada, Germany, France, Japan, and the United Kingdom. 12 additional countries formed the European Consortium for Ocean Research Drilling (ECORD), which was created to support the IODP.

== ODP Operations ==
Compared to the DSDP, the ODP was a more driven and organized program. The institutions heading the ODP planned to upgrade ocean drilling technology and expand operations. Drilling operations for the ODP were carried out by Texas A&M University, and downhole logging was performed by Lamont-Doherty Earth Observatory of Columbia University. The majority of the funding for the program came from the National Science Foundation, while about one-third was from international collaborators.

By the Numbers	
Distance Traveled	355,781 nmi
Sites Visited	669
Deepest Core Penetration	2,111 m
Number of Cores Recovered	35,772

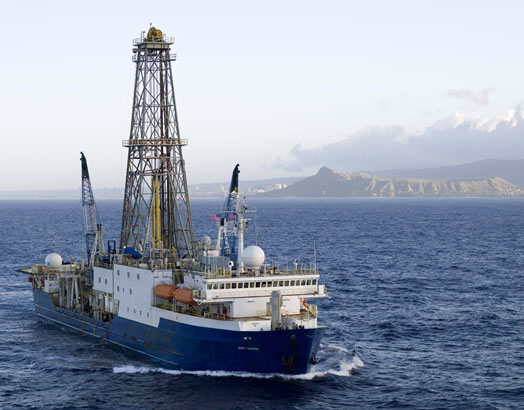
JOIDES Resolution

=== Technology ===
==== The JOIDES Resolution ====
Given the ambitions of the ODP to increase the scope of ocean drilling, the program needed a vessel with more advanced drilling technology and laboratories than the Glomar Challenger, the ship used for the DSDP. The Sedco/BP 471 drillship was selected for the program and upgraded with more advanced drilling technology. Originally built in Nova Scotia in 1978, the ship was owned by both Sedco Forex and the British Petroleum Corporation (BP).

Upgrades to the ship allowed for deeper drilling, more sophisticated laboratory analysis, and the ability to withstand more difficult environments. The drill string installed onboard was capable of reaching 30,000 feet with a minimum yield strength of 140,000 pounds per square inch. The ship had enough power to support a residential community of 14,000 people, which allowed for increased speed and drilling capabilities. Onboard laboratories had advanced scientific instrumentation and covered 145,000 square feet, which were the most modern floating geological laboratories at the time.

==== Circulation Obviation Retrofit Kit (CORK) ====
A specific technological advance that was implemented in the ODP was the CORK, which was used in 18 holes during ODP beginning in 1989. CORKs are a long-term hydrogeological monitoring system that sealed drilled holes and allowed for further observation. A CORK consisted of two parts: the body that sealed the system into the hole and the data log and sensor system. If drilled boreholes were left unsealed, the subsurface environment was disturbed and not able to be monitored in the future. Using CORKs to seal holes allowed environmental equilibrium to be reestablished, and observations provided understanding into hydrogeological processes in the subsurface.

== Scientific Accomplishments ==
The ODP and the other ocean drilling programs produced evidence that significantly improved understanding of oceanic process, spanning geochemistry, biology, and other associated Earth science fields.

=== Earth Processes ===
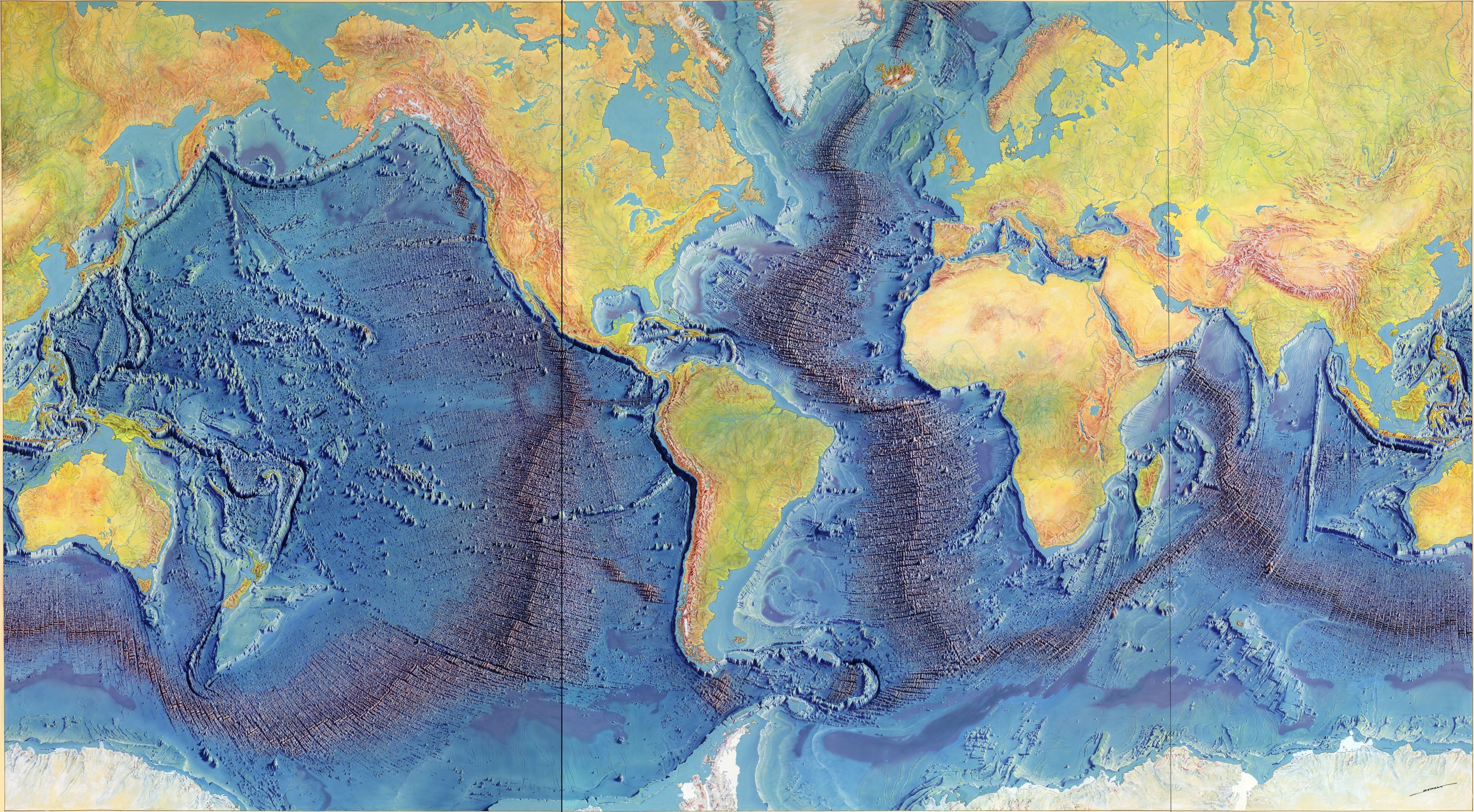
Seafloor Topography Map

Evidence from the ODP has led to better understanding of overall Earth processes. Most importantly, previous theories of seafloor spreading were confirmed. Additionally, scientists gained insights into the oceanic lithosphere, including its structure and composition as well as its formation. The ODP provided evidence that lithospheric composition varies depending on proximity to nearby seafloor spreading. Additionally, geological evidence from these expeditions provided a more detailed understanding of Earth's climate and ocean history, advancing the fields of paleoceanography and paleoclimatology.

==== Geomagnetism ====
Earth's magnetic field is generated by convection in the fluid outer core. In the past, this magnetic field has experienced reversals, in which the North and South Poles flip. Evidence of these reversals is contained in sediments, and samples from the ODP led to more precise geologic time scales.

==== Gas Hydrates ====
In certain subsurface environments with high pressure and low temperature, some gases, such as methane and carbon dioxide, can bond with water, forming ice-like substances. The ODP's Leg 164 at Blake Ridge was the first site to focus on gas hydrates. Recovery of gas hydrate sediments was difficult, due to the specific conditions in which they form, which led to the loss of material during the recovery process. New technology was used to obtain in situ data without having to extract the gas hydrates. Prior to the ODP, scientists had vague estimates of amounts and locations of gas hydrate formations. Data from the program increased certainty and provided more concrete evidence of the distribution of gas hydrates.

==== Hydrothermal Vents ====
As cold seawater enters the ocean crust at a hydrothermal vent, it is heated by subsurface magma and erupts from the vent. This process is driven by water-rock reactions beneath the ocean floor, so evidence from the ODP has led to better understanding of these reactions. This is essential to understanding overall marine chemistry and interactions between the ocean and Earth's crust.

=== Biological Processes ===
Prior to the ODP, there was little definitive evidence confirming whether or not bacterial populations exist in subseafloor sediments. 14 sites of the ODP focused specifically on studying bacteria, and the program's technology was able to collect core samples that were undisturbed and not contaminated to accurately examine bacterial populations and their activities.

==== Presence and Activities of Bacterial Populations ====
Evidence from the ODP contradicted expectations that biological activity is more heavily concentrated near Earth's surface. Large populations were discovered, which added around 10% to global biomass estimates. The abundance of bacterial populations decreased with depth, and deeper bacteria had slower growth rates. Despite this overall trend, there were certain geochemical conditions and thermogenic processes that allowed bacterial populations to thrive at depth. For example, near gas hydrate deposits, rates of methane oxidation increased due to the abundance of organic carbon present. Additionally, the rates of methanogenesis and acetate metabolism increased in bacteria in the subsurface compared to those near the surface.

==== Bacterial Motility ====
Another biological process that was examined was the motility of these bacterial populations. Scientists hoped to better understand if bacteria were trapped in deposited sediments or able to move freely throughout the subsurface. Evidence from the ODP showed that bacteria closer to the surface were motile, while those in deeper sediments were unable to keep up with sedimentation deposit rates and became buried.

== See also ==
- Project Mohole
- Deep Sea Drilling Project
- Integrated Ocean Drilling Program
- JOIDES Resolution
