= JOIDES Resolution =

Ship built in 1978

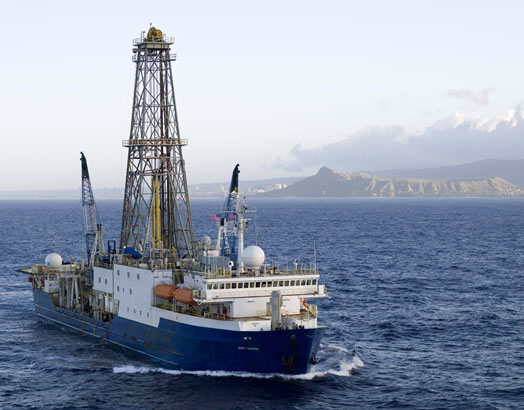
- JOIDES Resolution

History

Cyprus
- Name: JOIDES Resolution
- Namesake: HMS Resolution (1771)
- Owner: Overseas Drilling Limited, a subsidiary of Siem Offshore AS
- Operator: Siem Offshore AS
- Research operator: JOIDES Resolution Science Operator at Texas A&M University on behalf of the International Ocean Discovery Program
- Port of registry: Limassol, Cyprus
- Builder: Halifax Shipyard in Nova Scotia, Canada
- Launched: 1978
- Renamed: Sedco/BP 471 (1978 – 1996); JOIDES Resolution (1996 – present)
- Refit: 2009
- Identification: IMO number: 7423081; MMSI number: 209489000; Callsign: 5BMM3
- Nickname(s): JR

General characteristics
- Class & type: Special Service: Research Drilling Vessel
- Type: Ocean-going Research Vessel
- Tonnage: 10,282 GT
- Displacement: 9,992 – 18,636 ST
- Length: 470.5 ft (143.4 m)
- Beam: 70 ft (21 m)
- Height: 202 ft (62 m)
- Draught: 21.67 ft (6.6 m) reported max
- Ice class: 1B
- Installed power: 9,000 hp (6,700 kW)
- Speed: 11.7 knots (21.7 km/h; 13.5 mph) average; 15 knots (28 km/h; 17 mph) max
- Endurance: 75 Days
- Boats & landing craft carried: 4
- Complement: 125
- Crew: 65 + 60 Scientists/Technicians

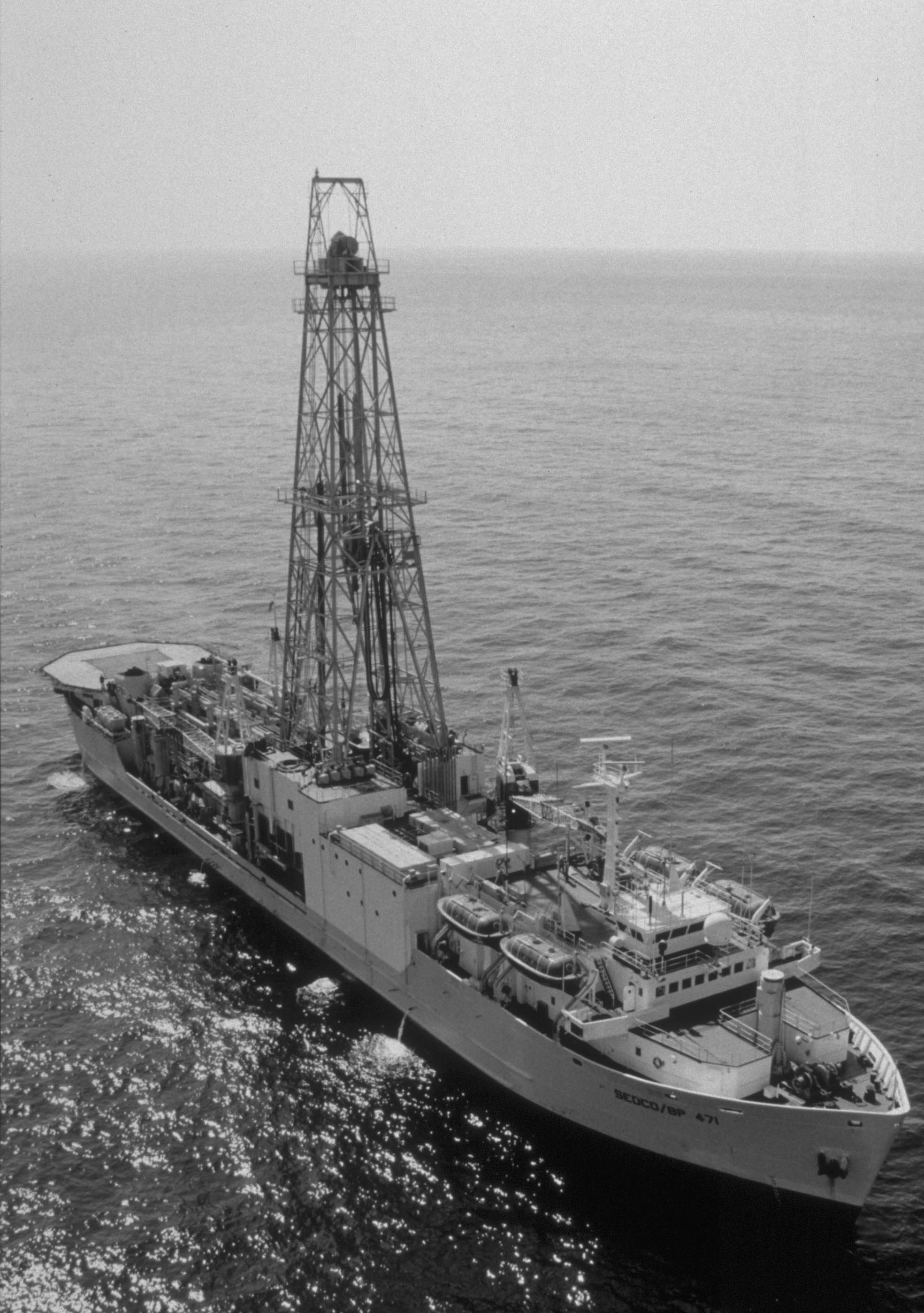
Drillship JOIDES Resolution in 1988

The riserless research vessel JOIDES Resolution (Joint Oceanographic Institutions for Deep Earth Sampling), often referred to as the JR, was one of the scientific drilling ships used by the International Ocean Discovery Program (IODP), an international, multi-drilling platform research program. JOIDES Resolution was previously the main research ship used during the Ocean Drilling Program (ODP) and was used along with the Japanese drilling vessel Chikyu and other mission-specific drilling platforms throughout the Integrated Ocean Drilling Program. She was the successor of Glomar Challenger.

The ship was first launched in 1978 as Sedco/BP 471, an oil exploration vessel. It was converted for scientific use 6 years later in 1984 and began working as the main research ship for ODP in January 1985. JOIDES Resolution was modernized during 2007–2008 and returned to active service in February 2009 following an extensive renovation of her laboratory facilities and quarters.

Texas A&M University (TAMU) acted as manager and science operator of JOIDES Resolution as a research facility for IODP. The JOIDES Resolution Science Operator (JRSO) was funded through a cooperative agreement with the US National Science Foundation (NSF), with international contributions from 23 Program member countries. The JOIDES Resolution ended operations in August 2024 following the non-renewal of NSF support.

== Naming ==
JOIDES Resolution was named after HMS Resolution, in which Captain James Cook made his second and third voyages of exploration in the Pacific in the 1770s.

== JOIDES Resolution capabilities ==
JOIDES Resolution employed wireline coring and logging techniques to recover sequences of core and geophysical data from beneath the seafloor. JOIDES Resolution operated in water depths between 76 metres (249 ft) and nominally 5,800 metres (19,000 ft) and reached a maximum depth of just over 2,100 metres (6,900 ft) beneath the seafloor. The longest drill string deployment was 6,919 metres (22,700 ft) while drilling in 5,724 metres (18,780 ft) water depth. Over her lifespan as a research vessel, JOIDES Resolution recovered more than 373 kilometres (232 mi) of core.

== Onboard facilities ==
JOIDES Resolution was a state-of-the-art "floating Earth science laboratory" equipped with analytical equipment, software, and databases that allowed shipboard scientists to conduct research at sea as soon as cores were recovered. Virtual 360° tours of laboratory areas and a flyover video of the ship are available online [see External links.]

=== Laboratories ===
The laboratory space included facilities for visually describing core at the macro- and microscale; microscopes for petrological sediment analysis and biostratigraphic assessment; instrumentation for measuring physical properties, paleomagnetism, and the geochemistry of pore waters, sediment, and rocks; and equipment for cutting and sectioning samples from rock and sediment cores. The downhole measurements laboratory was used as a staging and data-acquisition area for obtaining in situ records of subseafloor formation properties ranging from borehole well logs to formation temperature and pressure.

=== Other facilities ===
In addition to laboratories and technical resources, the JOIDES Resolution contained a conference room, offices, cabins (berths) for members of the crew and science parties, and a hospital, galley, and mess hall. A gym, movie room, and lounge with a small library were also provided.

== Technical advances ==
The capabilities of JOIDES Resolution and the tools and techniques used to address science objectives were continually improved during the life span of the scientific ocean drilling program. Key operational innovations included development of a half-length advanced piston corer (HLAPC) and the drill-in-casing and hydraulic release tool (HRT).

=== Half-length advanced piston corer ===
The HLAPC takes a 4.7 m (15 ft) core rather than a standard 9.5 m (31 ft) APC core. It was designed to potentially extend the depth of piston core penetration, allowing collection of cores suitable for high-resolution paleoceanography and paleoclimatology from greater depths. After initial deployment in 2013, the HLAPC increased the piston coring depth record to 490 m (1,610 ft) below seafloor. The HLAPC was also the only coring tool to successfully recover unconsolidated sands from the Bengal Fan (Expedition 354) and in other environments where the lithology proved difficult to recover using either the APC or extended core barrel (XCB) tools.

=== Drill-in-casing and hydraulic release tool ===
Deep sediment holes, including those that penetrate basement rock below sediments, traditionally have required pre-drilling a deep hole and installing double and triple casing strings to stabilize the upper hole, requiring as long as 7–10 days. Starting in 2014 on Expedition 352, the approach of drilling-in a single casing string and reentry system with a mud motor and underreamer without pre-drilling a hole resulted in casing the upper part of a hole in a shorter time (3–4 days). In 2015, a hydraulic release tool (HRT) was adapted to drill-in a reentry system with a short casing string to start a hole in bare rock seafloor at Southwest Indian Ridge (Expedition 360). The HRT and related hardware is now the standard drill-in casing system to establish a single casing string for deep sediment penetration.

== JOIDES Resolution science operations ==
Scientists drill the ocean floor to access the records of millions of years of Earth's climatic, biological, chemical, and geological history. Research can help to better understand and predict Earth's future, and can inform decision-making on environmental topics.

=== JOIDES Resolution Science Operator ===
JOIDES Resolution was managed and operated by the JRSO, which was based at TAMU. TAMU was science operator to JOIDES Resolution starting in 1983, managing the ODP from 1983 to 2003, partnering with the Consortium for Ocean Leadership and Lamont-Doherty Earth Observatory of Columbia University to co-manage the Integrated Ocean Drilling Program from 2004 to 2013, and managing the IODP from 2013 to 2024. In October 2014, the JOIDES Resolution Science Operator was formalized as the implementing organization for IODP. JRSO responsibilities included overseeing the JR's science operations; archiving data, samples, and logs collected by the current program; and producing and publicizing program publications, including expedition results, program plans, and fiscal reports.

=== The IODP Science Plan ===
With input from hundreds of international scientists, long-range science plans were developed to guide multidisciplinary international collaboration on scientific ocean drilling. These plans comprise a set of critical scientific questions that require drilling deep below the ocean floor. The IODP Science Plan for 2013–2023, Illuminating Earth's Past, Present, and Future, focuses on challenges in four areas.

• Climate and ocean change: reading the past, informing the future

• Biosphere frontiers: deep life, biodiversity, and environmental forcing of ecosystems

• Earth connections: deep processes and their impact on Earth's surface environment

• Earth in motion: processes and hazards on human time scales

The themes and challenges outlined in the IODP Science Plan were addressed by drilling expeditions that resulted from peer-reviewed proposals evaluated by the Science Evaluation Panel and an external review committee. The highest priority proposals were forwarded to the JOIDES Resolution Facility Board (JRFB), which then worked with the JRSO to set an expedition schedule to most efficiently and effectively achieve the proposals' objectives. The JRFB and NSF reviewed and approved the JRSO Annual Program Plans, which comprised tasks and budget requests in support of the scheduled expeditions.

=== Optimized expedition scheduling ===
The JRSO and the JRFB worked together to set a regional ship track, communicating to the science community the planned areas for JOIDES Resolution operations, generally 2–3 years ahead of the schedule. As a result of this regional planning, JOIDES Resolution was able to address several science plan themes on multiple, complementary expeditions. For example, Expeditions 350, 351, and 352, as well as Expedition 371 addressed the fundamental question of how the subduction process initiates. Likewise, two years of drilling in the western Pacific and Indian Oceans resulted in multiple expeditions that addressed the origin and initiation of the Monsoon climate system. Four planned drilling expeditions in the Antarctic and Southern Ocean will improve our understanding of how the Antarctic Ice Sheet responds to climatic forcing. These groups of expeditions formed virtual missions that made it possible to address science questions that are beyond the scope of an individual expedition.

=== End of operations ===
In March 2023, the U.S. National Science Foundation announced that it would no longer continue its funding in support of the JOIDES Resolution due to increasing cost of operation. The last expedition concluded in August 2024, after which the ship began demobilization in Amsterdam.

The ship embarked on its last expedition (IODP Expedition 403) in June 2024. Though there are no concrete plans for its replacement, repositories for the ship's collected cores will be maintained at Texas A&M, the University of Bremen, and Kōchi University in Japan.

== Legacy expeditions ==
JOIDES Resolution began conducting scientific ocean drilling expeditions in 1985. During the Ocean Drilling Program (1985–2003), JOIDES Resolution conducted 111 expeditions and drilled 669 sites. During the Integrated Ocean Drilling Program (2003–2013), JOIDES Resolution conducted 35 expeditions and drilled 145 sites. Highlights of Ocean Drilling Program and Integrated Ocean Drilling Program expeditions can be found in the final technical reports for those programs (see References). Monitoring of boreholes began with the installation of a broadband seismometer in Hole 794D in 1989 during the Ocean Drilling Program. Subsequently, more than 30 long-term borehole observatories ranging from simple to complex have been installed.

== Coring statistics ==
Detailed JOIDES Resolution coring statistics by program are available online. The following tables include overall statistics and highlights.

Program	Expeditions completed	Operations days	Miles traveled	Sites visited	Holes drilled	Cores recovered	Meters of core recovered
International Ocean Discovery Program (October 2013–September 2024; Expeditions 349–403)	48	3,994	208,615	220	599	16,226	93,294
Integrated Ocean Drilling Program (2003–2013)	31	1,836	126,889	145	439	8,491	57,289
Ocean Drilling Program (1985–2003)	111	6,591	355,781	669	1,797	35,772	222,704
Total	190	12,421	691,285	1,034	2,835	60,489	373,287

Program	Northernmost site	Southernmost site	Shallowest water depth	Deepest water depth	Deepest hole
International Ocean Discovery Program	79.1 deg N	76.6 deg S	87 m	5,012 m	1,806 m
Integrated Ocean Drilling Program	67 deg N	66.4 deg S	95.5 m	4,479 m	1,928 m
Ocean Drilling Program	80.5 deg N	70.8 deg S	37.5 m	5,980 m	2,111 m

== JOIDES Resolution outreach ==
JOIDES Resolution was used as a platform for education and outreach. Onboard Education/Outreach Officers sailed on each expedition, and JRSO personnel were available to assist with ship-to-shore video conferencing, port call tours, and outreach efforts. The inaugural School of Rock workshop (Hands-on Research Experiences for Earth and Ocean Science Educators) was held on board JOIDES Resolution in 2005, and the ship continued to be used for School of Rock workshops when it was available on transits or during maintenance periods until 2024.

== See also ==
- Deep Sea Drilling Project
- Ocean Drilling Program
- Integrated Ocean Drilling Program
- International Ocean Discovery Program
