= Integrated Ocean Drilling Program =

Marine research program (2003–2013)

- Established: 2003
- Field of research: Geology
- Website: www.iodp.org

The Integrated Ocean Drilling Program (IODP) was an international marine research program running from 2003 to 2013. The program used heavy drilling equipment mounted aboard ships to monitor and sample sub-seafloor environments. With this research, the IODP documented environmental change, Earth processes and effects, the biosphere, solid earth cycles, and geodynamics.

The program began a new 10-year phase with the International Ocean Discovery Program, from the end of 2013.

== Navigating the route to discovery ==
Scientific ocean drilling represented the longest running and most successful international collaboration among the Earth sciences. Scientific ocean drilling began in 1961 with the first sample of oceanic crust recovered aboard the CUSS 1, a modified U.S. Navy barge. American author John Steinbeck, also an amateur oceanographer, documented Project Mohole for LIFE Magazine.

== Legacy programs ==
The Deep Sea Drilling Project (DSDP), established in June 1966, operated Glomar Challenger in drilling and coring operations in the Atlantic, Pacific, and Indian Oceans, as well as in the Mediterranean and Red Seas. Glomar Challenger's coring operations enabled DSDP to provide the next intellectual step in verifying the hypothesis of plate tectonics associated with seafloor spreading, by dating basal sediments on transects away from the Mid-Atlantic Ridge.

Deep Ocean Explorer: Glomar Challenger
Total distance penetrated below sea floor	325,548 m (1,068,071 feet)
Total interval cored	170,043 m (557,884 feet)
Total core recovered and stored	97,056 m (318,425 feet)
Overall core recovery	57%
Number of core samples recovered	19,119
Number of sites investigated	624
Deepest penetration into basaltic ocean crust	1,714 m (5,623 feet)
Maximum penetration into basaltic ocean crust	1,350 m (4,430 feet)
Deepest water (Leg 60, Site 461A)	7,044 m (23,110 feet)
Total distance traveled	375,632 nautical miles (695,670 km; 432,270 mi)

In June 1970, Glomar Challenger's DSDP engineers devised a way to replace worn drill bits and then re-enter boreholes for deeper drilling while in the Atlantic Ocean off the coast of New York, in 3,000 m (10,000 feet) of water. This required the use of sonar scanning equipment and a large-scale re-entry cone.

Process-oriented Earth studies continued from 1985 until 2003 aboard JOIDES Resolution, which replaced Glomar Challenger in January 1985 as DSDP morphed into the Ocean Drilling Program (ODP). JOIDES Resolution is named for the 200-year-old HMS Resolution which explored the Pacific Ocean and Antarctica under the command of Captain James Cook.

The Ocean Drilling Program contributed significantly to increased scientific understanding of Earth history, climate change, plate tectonics, natural resources, and geohazards. ODP discoveries included validation of:

1. fluids circulating through the ocean floor;
2. the formation of gigantic volcanic plateaus at phenomenal rates unknown today;
3. natural methane frozen deep within marine sediments as gas hydrate;
4. a microbial community living deep within oceanic crust;
5. climate change cycles

== IODP funding agencies ==
National consortia and government funding agencies supported IODP science and drilling platform operations. Participation in IODP was proportional to investment in the program.

=== Contributing member ===
The European Consortium for Ocean Research Drilling (ECORD) was established in December 2003 with 13 European countries to represent the European contribution in IODP. The consortium grew into a collaborative group of 17 European nations (Austria, Belgium, Denmark, Finland, France, Germany, Iceland, Ireland, Italy, The Netherlands, Norway, Poland, Portugal, Spain, Sweden, Switzerland and the United Kingdom) and Canada that together comprise an IODP-funding agency. Working alongside Japan and the United States, ECORD provided the IODP scientific community with access to mission-specific platforms, which chosen to fulfill specific scientific objectives. These platforms have limited space on board for labs and scientists, and require an onshore science meeting to describe, process, and analyze the sediment samples collected immediately following a drilling expedition.

=== Associate members ===
In April 2004, the People's Republic of China joined IODP as an Associate Member through sponsorship of China's Ministry of Science and Technology (MOST). China's participation in IODP has given the Chinese marine science community a new impetus and increased their opportunity for deep-sea research. Chinese scientists participated in research expeditions and represent China's interests in the IODP Science Advisory Structure.

The Republic of Korea joined IODP as an Associate Member in June 2006 through the sponsorship of the Korea Institute of Geoscience and Mineral Resources (KIGAM). South Korea's memorandum of understanding with the lead agencies created the Interim Asian Consortium.

Ministry of Earth Sciences (MoES), Government of India joined the IODP in 2008 as an Associate member. Since then, the National Centre for Antarctic and Ocean Research (NCAOR), Goa has been designated by India to look after all IODP related activities in India (IODP-India). In this direction, an international workshop on IODP drilling in Indian Ocean was organized in Goa during 17–18 October 2011. The workshop was co-hosted by IODP Management International and ANZIC.

Hundreds of international Earth and ocean scientists participated in IODP on a voluntary basis. Participation took many forms: submission of a drilling proposal; sailing on an expedition; participation in an advisory capacity; attendance at a planning workshop or topical symposium. The program's central management office, IODP Management International, coordinated an integrated work plan between and among all IODP organizational partners. An annual program plan was written each fiscal year and included objectives and tasks necessary for drilling vessel operation, from science coordination to publications, data management, and outreach.

== Uniquely IODP ==
IODP distinguishes itself from its legacy programs by employing multiple drilling technologies/platforms and science/drilling operators to acquire sediment and rock samples and to install monitoring instrumentation beneath the seafloor. Samples and data collected during IODP drilling expeditions are available to scientists and teachers on an open-access basis, once members of the expedition parties have completed their initial studies.

== Planning IODP drilling: science advisory structure ==
=== Drilling proposal process ===
Drilling proposals originated with science proponents, often researchers in geology, geophysics, microbiology, paleontology, or seismology. Once submitted to IODP, the proposal was carefully evaluated by the Science Advisory Structure (SAS), a group of technical review panels. Only those proposals judged as the greatest value based on scientific and technical merit were scheduled for implementation.

SAS panels provided advice on drilling proposals to both proponents and IODP management. Drilling proposals were accepted twice a year, in April and October, and could be submitted to IODP electronically via their website.

=== The science plan ===
A ten-year program plan called the Initial Science Plan (ISP) guided IODP investigation. Specific scientific themes were emphasized in the ISP:

1. investigation into the deep biosphere and subseafloor life;
2. climate change;
3. solid Earth cycles; and
4. geodynamics

As described in the ISP, IODP sought to develop better understandings of:

- the earthquake-generating zone beneath convergent continental margins;
- the complex microbial ecosystem that exists beneath the seafloor;
- the nature of gas hydrates that lie beneath continental margins;
- climate history, extreme climates;
- rapid climate change;
- the role of continental break-up in sedimentary basin formation;
- the formation of volcanic rifted margins and oceanic plateaus through time; and
- drilling to Earth's mantle to examine and monitor a complete section of oceanic crust

Tools critical to these goals included a riser-equipped drilling vessel, a riserless vessel, additional platforms suited to mission specific expeditions, enhanced downhole measurement devices, and long-term monitoring instrumentation.

=== Engineering proposals ===
An engineering proposal submission process, initiated in April 2007, facilitated the acquisition of existing or latent technology to be used in IODP operations.

== Science and drilling operators ==
Drilling operations were conducted and managed by three IODP implementing organizations:

- United States Implementing Organization (USIO) carried out expeditions on the riserless drilling vessel JOIDES Resolution;
- ECORD Science Operator (ESO) managed mission specific expeditions on various platforms;
- Center for Deep Earth Exploration (CDEX) managed operations aboard the riser-equipped drilling vessel Chikyū.

Each drilling expedition was led by a pair of co-chief scientists, with a team of scientists supported by a staff scientist. Each implementing organization provided a combination of services: technical, operational, and financial management; logging; laboratory; core repository; data management; and publication. Although each implementing organization was responsible for its own platform operations and performance, its science operations was funded by the lead agencies.

The operators conducted the following expeditions during the IODP:

Expedition	Title
301	Juan de Fuca Hydrogeology
302	Arctic Coring Expedition
303	North Atlantic Climate 1
304	Oceanic Core Complex Formation, Atlantis Massif 1
305	Oceanic Core Complex Formation, Atlantis Massif 2
306	North Atlantic Climate 2
307	Porcupine Basin Carbonate Mounds
308	Gulf of Mexico Hydrogeology
309	Superfast Spreading Rate Crust 2
310	Tahiti Sea Level
311	Cascadia Margin Gas Hydrates
312	Superfast Spreading Rate Crust 3
313	New Jersey Shallow Shelf
314	NanTroSEIZE Stage 1: LWD Transect
315	NanTroSEIZE Stage 1: Megasplay Riser Pilot
316	NanTroSEIZE Stage 1: Shallow Megasplay and Frontal Thrusts
317	Canterbury Basin Sea Level
318	Wilkes Land Glacial History
319	NanTroSEIZE Stage 2: Riser/Riserless Observa
320	Pacific Equatorial Age Transect I
321	Pacific Equatorial Age Transect II / Juan de Fuca
322	NanTroSEIZE Stage 2: Subduction Input
323	Bering Sea Paleoceanography
324	Shatsky Rise Formation
325	Great Barrier Reef Environmental Changes
326	NanTroSEIZE Stage 3: Plate Boundary Deep Riser 1
327	Juan de Fuca Hydrogeology
328	Cascadia ACORK Observatory
329	South Pacific Gyre Subseafloor Life
330	Louisville Ridge
331	Deep Hot Biosphere
332	NanTroSEIZE Stage 2: Riserless Observatory
333	NanTroSEIZE Stage 2: Subduction Inputs 2 and Heat Flow
334	Costa Rica Seismogenesis Project (CRISP)
335	Superfast Spreading Rate Crust 4
336	Mid-Atlantic Ridge Microbiology
337	Deep Coalbed Biosphere off Shimokita
338	NanTroSEIZE Stage 3: Plate Boundary Deep Riser 2
339	Mediterranean Outflow
340	Lesser Antilles Volcanism and Landslides
340T	Atlantis Massif Oceanic Core Complex
341	Southern Alaska Margin Tectonics, Climate & Sedimentation
341S	SCIMPI
342	Paleogene Newfoundland Sediment Drifts
343	Japan Trench Fast Drilling Project
343T	Japan Trench Fast Drilling Project II
344	Costa Rica Seismogenesis Project A Stage 2
345	Hess Deep Plutonic Crust
346	Asian Monsoon
347	Baltic Sea Paleoenvironment
348	Nankai Trough Seismogenic Zone Experiment Stage 3, Plate Boundary Deep Riser

== Drilling vessels and platforms ==
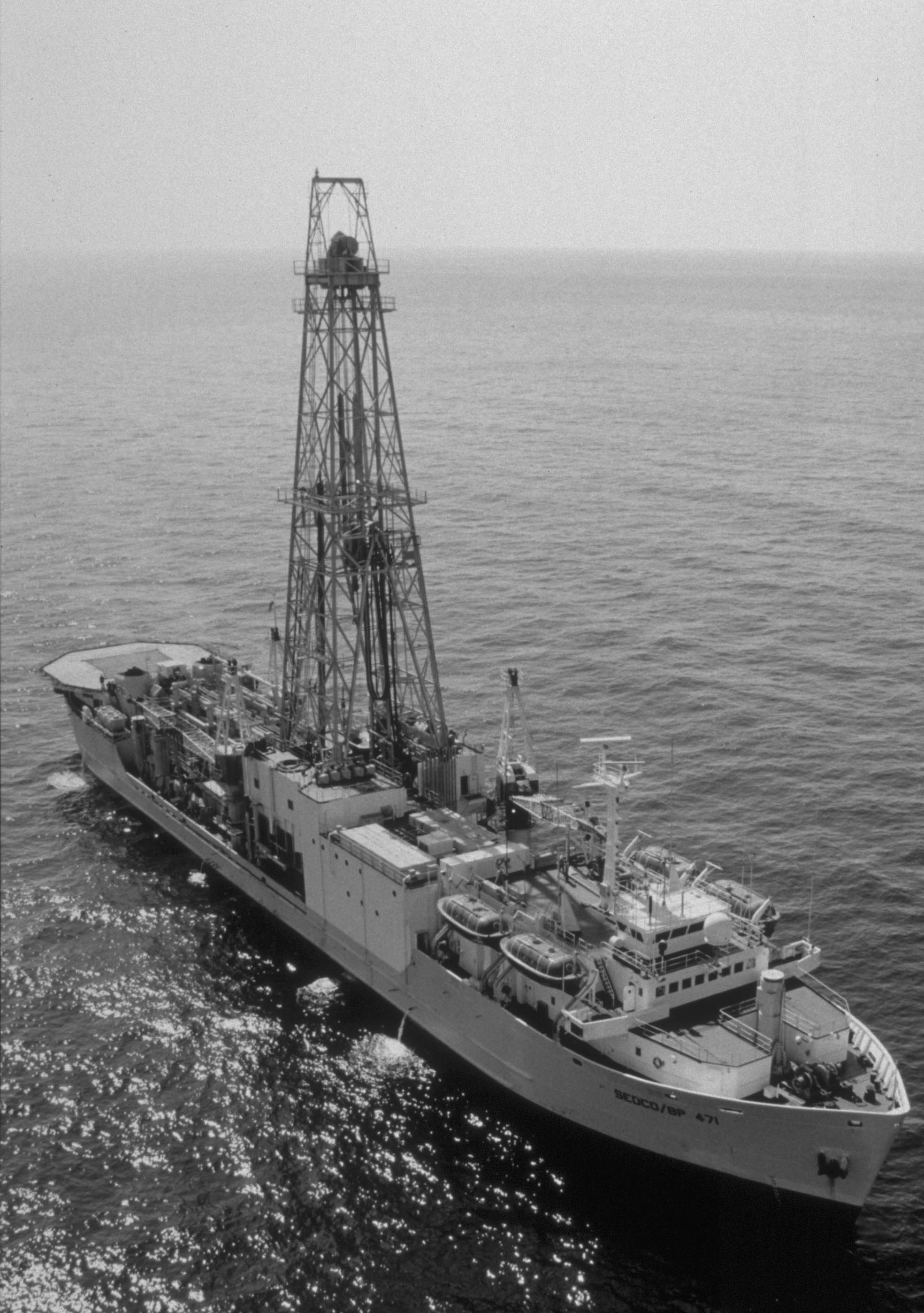
JOIDES Resolution

IODP employed two dedicated drilling vessels, each sponsored by a lead agency and managed by their respective implementing organization:

=== JOIDES Resolution – riserless ===
The U.S.-sponsored drilling vessel was operated throughout the Ocean Drilling Program and the first phase of IODP. The vessel then underwent a rebuild, allowing for increased laboratory space; improved drilling, coring, and sampling capacity; and enhanced health, safety, and environmental protection systems on board.

=== Chikyū – riser-equipped ===
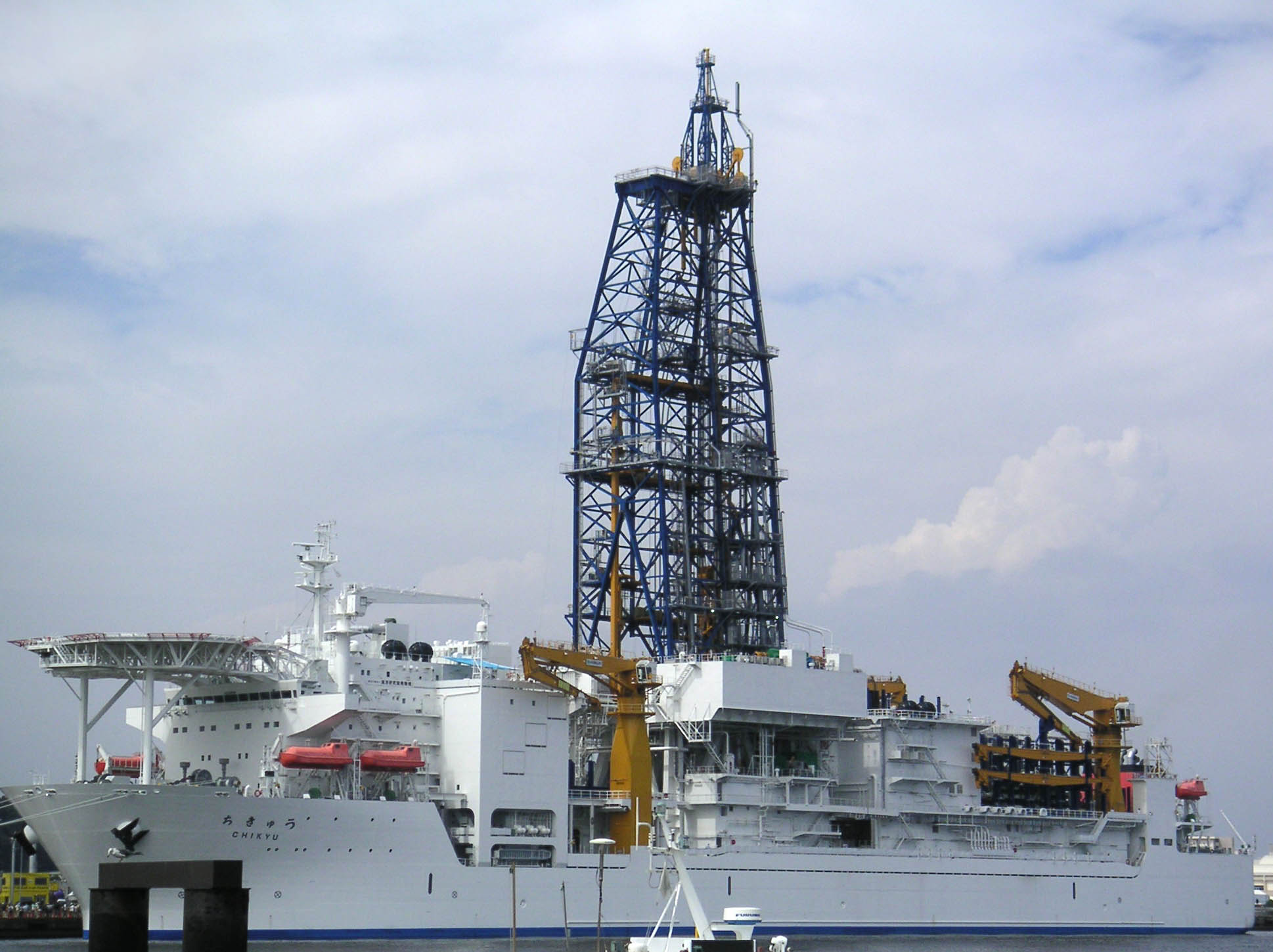
Chikyū

Japan began building a state-of-the-art scientific drilling vessel for research in 2001 with the intent of reaching Earth's mantle and drilling into an active seismogenic zone. The resulting drilling vessel, Chikyū (Japanese for "Planet Earth") features a riser drilling system, a dynamic positioning system, and a high-density mud circulation system to prevent borehole collapse during drilling, among other assets. Chikyu can berth 150 people, cruise at 12 knots (22 km/h; 14 mph), and drill more than 7,000 m (23,000 feet) below the seafloor in water depths exceeding 2,000 m (6,600 feet). Chikyū was damaged during the tsunami of 11 March 2011, and was out-of-service for several months. Chikyū returned to ocean drilling in April 2012.

=== Mission-specific platforms ===
ECORD commissioned ships on an expedition-by-expedition basis, depending on specific scientific requirements and environment. ECORD contracted the use of three icebreakers for the Arctic Coring Expedition (2004), drilling vessels diving for use in shallow Tahitian (2005) and Australian waters (2010), where scientists sampled fossil coral reefs to investigate the rise in global sea levels since the last ice age, and a liftboat for sampling the New Jersey Shallow Shelf (2009). Mission-specific expeditions required substantial flexibility.

== Extending IODP to the science community ==
Publications, data management, online tools, and databases are in development to support information- and resource-sharing, so as to expand the ranks of scientists who engage in ocean drilling investigations.

=== Publication and data management ===
IODP publications are freely available online and a data management system integrates core and laboratory data collected by all three implementing organizations and the two IODP legacy programs. A web-based search system will eventually aggregate post-expedition data and related publications. Requests for data and samples can be made online.

=== Site Survey Data Bank (SSDB) ===
A web-based Site Survey Data Bank enabled proponents to access and deposit the large amounts of data required to document potential drill sites for evaluation. This data was reviewed to assure IODP expeditions could meet their objectives and comply with safety and environmental requirements.

=== Core repositories ===
Three IODP core repositories located in Bremen, Germany (IODP Bremen Core Repository), College Station, Texas (IODP Gulf Coast Repository), and Kochi, Japan, archive cores based on geographical origin. Scientists may visit any one of the facilities for onsite research or request a loan for analysis or for teaching purposes. Archived cores include not only IODP samples, but also those retrieved in the two IODP legacy programs (DSDP and ODP).

== See also ==
- Ocean Drilling Program - predecessor program to IODP
- International Continental Scientific Drilling Program – Multinational program in the field geoscience
- JOIDES Basin – Undersea basin of the central Ross continental shelf
