= Frederick Colwell =

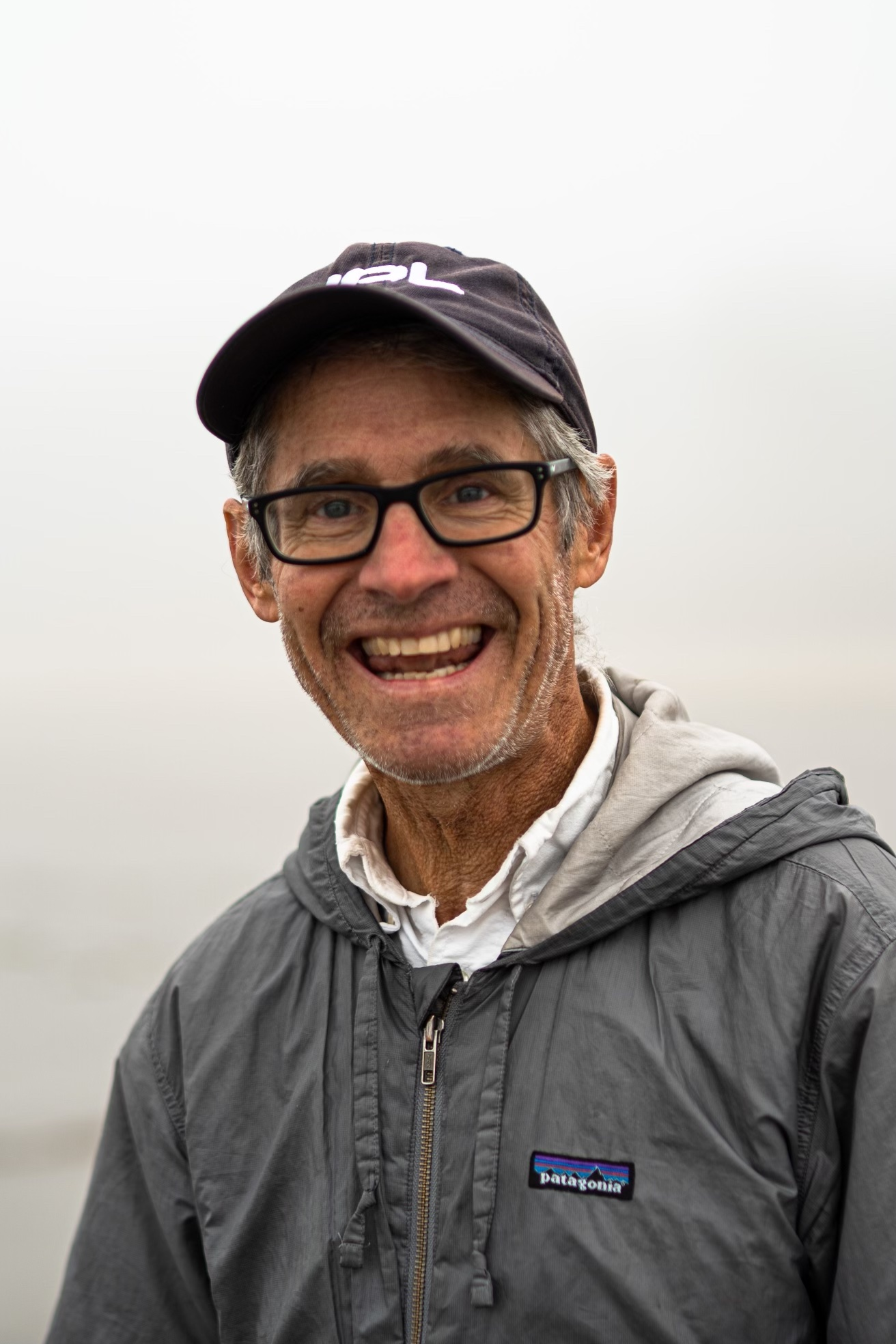

Frederick (Rick) Colwell is a microbial ecologist specializing in subsurface microbiology and geomicrobiology. He is a professor of ocean ecology and biogeochemistry at Oregon State University, and an adjunct and affiliate faculty member at Idaho State University.

== Career ==
Colwell earned his BA in Biology from Whitman College in 1977, his MS in microbiology at Northern Arizona University in 1982, and his PhD in microbiology at Virginia Tech in 1986. He completed his postdoctoral research at Idaho National Laboratory in 1988, when he became a scientist there. Colwell joined the faculty of the College of Oceanic and Atmospheric Sciences at Oregon State University in June 2006. He has served as president of the International Society for Subsurface Microbiology since 2008. He is a reviewer for Applied and Environmental Microbiology and a member of the editorial board of the journal Biodegradation. Colwell is a member of the Deep Carbon Observatory’s Deep Life Scientific Steering Committee.

== Research ==
In his research, Colwell uses molecular methods to investigate the rates of microbial activities. He has projects focused on methane hydrates and methane seeps in marine sediments and microbes that precipitate the mineral calcite in aquifers and other subsurface environments. Colwell and marine geologist Martin Fisk, are studying microbial communities within deep volcanic rocks at the Wallula pilot well in eastern Washington state. Carbon dioxide will be injected into the well to test carbon sequestration. Colwell will examine how the microbial communities respond to the carbon dioxide injections and whether will be useful for monitoring and measuring the presence of carbon dioxide. Colwell was part of the North pond exploration in the Atlantic Ocean with Katrina Edwards to examine the microbes living in the rocks and sediments beneath the seafloor.
