= Fumio Inagaki =

Fumio Inagaki is a geomicrobiologist whose research focuses on the deep subseafloor biosphere. He is the deputy director of the Research and Development Center for Ocean Drilling Science and the Kochi Institute for Core Sample Research, which are both part of the Japan Agency for Marine-Earth Science and Technology (JAMSTEC).

== Career ==
Inagaki studied microbiology and molecular genetics at Kyushu University, Japan, where he obtained his BS, MS, and PhD. He completed his doctorate in 2000 in the lab of Seiya Ogata, and then joined JAMSTEC as a research scientist in the Deep-Sea Frontier Research Program. From 2005–2006, he was a guest scientist at the Max Planck Institute for Marine Microbiology in Bremen, Germany where he worked with Bo Barker Jørgensen. Inagaki continued his work at JAMSTEC, and is now the group leader of the Geomicrobiology Group at the Kochi Institute for Core Sample Research and the Geobiotechnology Group at the Research and Development Center for Submarine Resources. Inagaki is a member of the American Association for the Advancement of Science, the American Geophysical Union, the Geochemical Society, the International Society of Extremophiles, the International Society for Microbial Ecology, the Japanese Association for Petroleum Technology, the Japan Geoscience Union, the Japan Society for Bioscience, Biotechnology, and Agrochemistry, the Japanese Society for Extremophiles, and the Japanese Society for Microbial Ecology. Since 2005, he has served on the editorial board of Applied and Environmental Microbiology, and in 2017 he became a senior editor for The ISME Journal. Inagaki was an editor of the book Earth and Life Processes Discovered from Subseafloor Environments: A Decade of Science Achieved by the Integrated Ocean Drilling Program (IODP). He is a member of the Deep Life Community Scientific Steering Committee for the Deep Carbon Observatory (DCO). In 2015, Inagaki won the Asahiko Taira International Scientific Ocean Drilling Research Prize, awarded by the American Geophysical Union, in recognition of his interdisciplinary work to understand the limits of microbial life on Earth through ocean drilling.

== Research Initiatives ==
Inagaki's research has advanced knowledge of microbes that live beneath the ocean floor. He was the first to report the vertical and geographical distribution of microbes in deeply buried marine sediments of the Pacific Ocean Margins. He used stable isotope tracing experiments to show that cells in deep subseafloor sediments are metabolically active. Inagaki has developed new techniques and instrumentation for ocean drilling. He was a co-chief on the International Ocean Drilling Program Expedition 337 on board the vessel Chikyū. They set a world record for scientific drilling, reaching 2,466 meters below the seafloor off Shimokita Peninsula of Japan in the northwest Pacific Ocean. The expedition showed the existence of microbial life in coal sediments down to almost 2.5 kilometers beneath the seafloor. In 2016, Inagaki was a co-chief on IODP Expedition 370 to the Nankai Trough, located about 120 kilometers off the coast of Japan. The research group drilled 1.2 kilometers down, to where sediment and rock reach temperatures of 130 °C, to determine the temperature limits of subsurface life.

In 2006 Inagaki and colleagues reported the finding of a submarine lake of liquid carbon dioxide.
