= Beth Orcutt =

American oceanographer

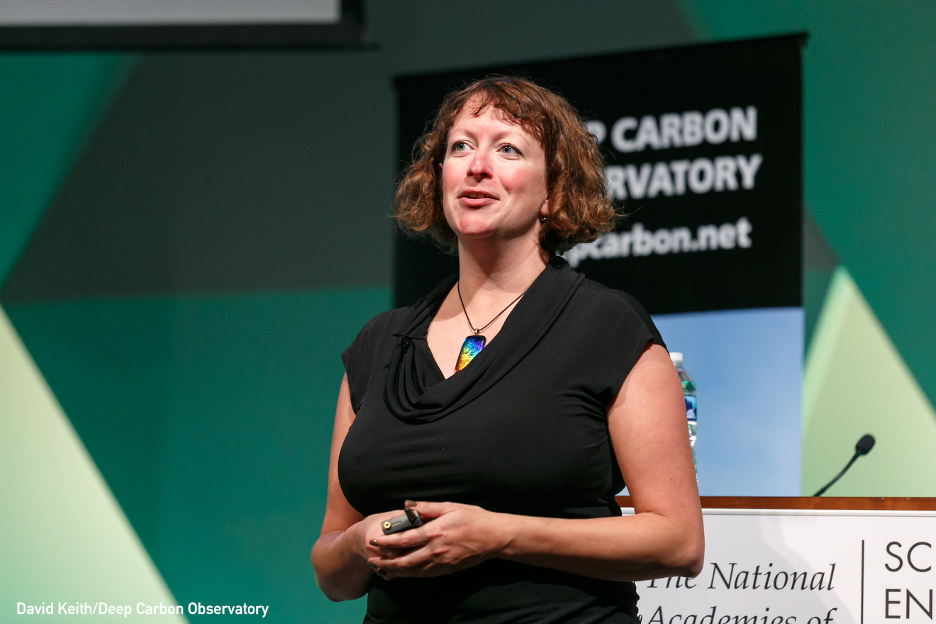
- Orcutt in 2019
- Education: University of Georgia
- Scientific career
- Fields: Oceanography
- Workplaces: Bigelow Laboratory for Ocean Sciences
- Doctoral advisor: Samantha Joye

Beth N. Orcutt is an American oceanographer whose research focuses on the microbial life of the ocean floor. As of 2012, she is a senior research scientist at the Bigelow Laboratory for Ocean Sciences. In 2022, she became the Vice President for Research at the Bigelow Laboratory for Ocean Sciences. She also serves as a senior scientist at the Center for Dark Energy Biosphere Investigations, a National Science Foundation-funded Science and Technology Center based at the University of Southern California. She is a member of the Deep Carbon Observatory's Deep Life Community and has worked with the International Scientific Ocean Drilling Program. Orcutt has made fundamental contributions to the study of life below the seafloor, particularly in oceanic crust. She is also the associate director of the Crustal Ocean Biosphere Research Accelerator project, where she works to further research the deep-sea. As of 2026, she has helped write and publish 52 available articles.

== Education and career ==
Orcutt attended the University of Georgia, obtaining a BS degree in 2002 and a PhD in marine sciences in 2007, supervised by Samantha Joye. During her graduate studies she collaborated extensively with Antje Boetius at the Max Planck Institute for Marine Microbiology and Kai-Uwe Hinrichs at the University of Bremen, both in Bremen, Germany. She held postdoctoral positions at the University of Southern California (2007–2009) under Katrina Edwards and at the Aarhus University in Denmark (2009–2012) under Bo Barker Jørgensen. She joined the Bigelow Laboratory for Ocean Sciences in 2012 and became Vice President for Research there in 2022. She has also been an adjunct assistant professor at the University of Southern California since 2009.

== Research activities ==
Orcutt's research involves deep-sea exploration. Orcutt has traveled to the ocean's seafloor several times aboard the submersibles Alvin and Johnson Sea Link. In 2015, she co-led an IODP scientific drilling Expedition 357 called "Atlantis Massif Serpentinization and Life" to explore life below the seafloor at the Atlantis Massif which hosts the Lost City hydrothermal field. This expedition was coordinated by ECORD and co-led with Gretchen Früh-Green of ETH Zurich. This expedition successfully used deep-sea drilling to collect rock samples from the mantle of the Atlantis Massif of the Mid-Atlantic Ridge, and showed that they contain hydrogen and methane. Orcutt's research was featured in the documentary "North Pond: The Search for Intraterrestrials" which won "Best Documentary Feature Film" at the 2014 Yosemite International Film Festival and "Honorable Mention" at the 2014 Blue Ocean Film Festival. Orcutt led the researchers of the Luʻuaeahikiikapapakū expedition in 2021; an expedition with the goal of exploring and analyzing the seamounts of the Papahānaumokuākea Marine National Monument. In 2022, Orcutt conducted further research on deep sea mining and the repercussions that it may hold for wildlife and sustainability objectives. This research presented an alternative perspective to the economic side of deep sea mining, taking on an environmental and humanistic approach.

In 2023, Orcutt and a team of researchers from both the United States and Costa Rica explored a rocky outcrop region near Costa Rica in the Pacific Ocean. They were aboard the R/V Falkor (too), searching for deep-sea octopuses using a ship controlled ROV. The team discovered four new octopus species, including the Dorado octopus, which was found brooding eggs at hydrothermal springs, along with three other species exhibiting distinct traits, such as larger eyes, varying sucker arrangements, and bumpy or pale skin. Orcutt's findings highlight the remarkable diversity of octopuses in the region and suggest the Muusoctopus genus has adapted to brood in warm, hydrothermal environments.
