= Thomas L. Kieft =

Environmental microbiologist

Dr. Thomas L. Kieft is an environmental microbiologist who investigates the ecology and biogeochemistry of microbes in extreme environments. He is a professor of biology at New Mexico Institute of Mining and Technology.

Dr. Kieft completed a master's degree in Biology at New Mexico Highlands University in 1978 and a PhD in Biology at University of New Mexico in 1983. He went on to be a visiting assistant research microbiologist in the Department of Plant and Soil Biology at the University of California, Berkeley from 1983 – 1985 before joining the faculty at New Mexico Institute of Mining and Technology. He is a member of the Deep Life Scientific Steering Committee for the Deep Carbon Observatory (DCO).

In his research, Kieft has investigated the deep biosphere in South African gold mines and developed new methods for detecting pathogenic microorganisms and microbial toxins. Recent work focuses on uncovering relationships between the abundance and diversity of microbes that live in association with animals, and an animal's mass.
