= Wang Fengping =

Chinese marine microbiologist

Wang Fengping (Chinese: 王风平; born 1971) is a Chinese marine microbiologist who studies microbes that live in deep sea and subsurface environments, with a special focus on the physiology and geochemical roles of organisms that cannot yet be cultivated in the lab. She is a professor at Shanghai Jiao Tong University.

== Career ==
Wang earned an MS in Crop Genetics and Breeding in 1995 and a PhD in Molecular Biology in 1998 at Huazhong Agricultural University in Wuhan, China. Following her doctoral work, she completed a postdoctoral fellowship at Osnabrück University, in Osnabrück, Germany. In 2002, Wang joined the staff of the Key Laboratory of Marine Biogenetic Resources, Third Institute of Oceanography, in Xiamen, China. She became a faculty member of the School of Life Sciences and Biotechnology at Shanghai Jiao Tong University in 2009. Wang was awarded the Outstanding Young Scientist Grant from the National Natural Science Foundation of China for deep biosphere research. She has served as a scientific committee member of the Integrated Ocean Drilling Program-China since 2014, and is a member of the Deep Life Scientific Steering Committee for the Deep Carbon Observatory (DCO).

== Research initiatives ==
Wang's research investigates the diversity and geochemical processes of microbes living in marine sediments. By sequencing DNA from Archaea, Wang's group determined that the Bathyarchaeota, a group of Archaea that are abundant in marine sediments, is its own distinct phylum. She named the phylum in 2014. She provided genetic evidence that some Bathyarchaeota are capable of converting carbon dioxide to acetate to generate energy in a process called homoacetogenesis. Previously, this type of metabolism was known to exist only in bacteria. Her lab also has investigated the metabolism and environmental adaptations of Shewanella piezotolerans, a pressure-tolerant, deep-sea, iron reducing bacterium.
