= Craig Manning =

Craig Manning may refer to:

- Craig E. Manning, a professor of geology and geochemistry at the University of California, Los Angeles
- Craig Manning, a character in Degrassi: The Next Generation
