= Dimitri Sverjensky =

Geochemistry professor

Dimitry Svergensky
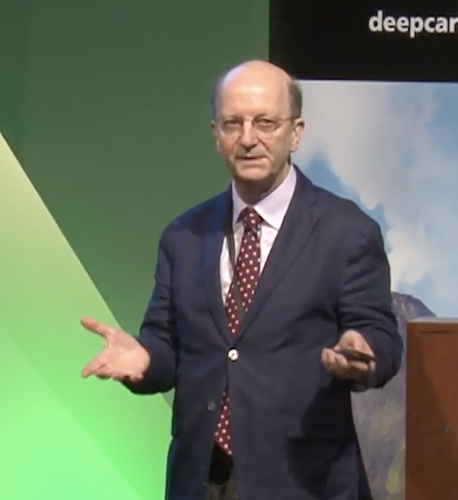
- Education: 1974 B.S. University of Sydney 1977 M.S. Yale University 1980 Ph.D Yale University
- Awards: 2021, Fellow, American Geophysical Union
- Scientific career
- Fields: Geochemistry
- Workplaces: Lawrence Berkeley Laboratory SUNY Stony Brook Johns Hopkins University

Dimitri Alexander Sverjensky is a professor in Earth and Planetary Sciences at Johns Hopkins University where his research is focused on geochemistry.

== Career ==
Dimitri Sverjensky received his B.Sc. from the University of Sydney, Australia in 1974. He went on to Yale University where he received his Masters and Ph.D in Geology in 1977 and 1980. After leaving Yale, Sverjensky worked as a staff scientist at the Lawrence Berkeley Laboratory, before becoming an assistant professor at SUNY Stony Brook. In 1984, he was appointed an assistant professor at Johns Hopkins University, and later promoted to associate professor. Since 1991 he has been a professor in the Department of Earth and Planetary Sciences at Johns Hopkins University. Throughout his academic career, he has served as associate editor for Economic Geology and Geochimica et Cosmochimica Acta. From 2005 to 2015, he was the senior visiting investigator at the Geophysical Laboratory at the Carnegie Institution of Washington.

Sverjensky is a member of the Deep Carbon Observatory’s Extreme Physics and Chemistry Community, where he also serves on its Scientific Steering Committee.

== Research initiatives ==
Sverjensky’s research areas include aqueous geochemistry, mineral surface geochemistry, thermodynamics, and water-rock interaction. In 2005 he started a collaboration at the Carnegie Institution of Washington in astrobiology, addressing the role of mineral-water interfacial reactions in the origin of life and the role of hydrothermal fluids. They also developed a historical approach to the appearance of minerals on Earth called mineral evolution.

Sverjensky is investigating the surface environments on early Earth using theoretical models of weathering and element mobility. In 2012 he launched a new field of research through the Deep Carbon Observatory investigating the role of water in deep Earth. Current areas of investigation include the origins of fluids in diamonds, the species and transport of carbon, sulfur and nitrogen in subduction zones, and the role of fluids in oxidation of mantle wedges.

== Publications ==
- Sverjensky, Dimitri A. (January 1984). "Europium redox equilibria in aqueous solution". Earth and Planetary Science Letters. 67 (1): 70–78. Bibcode:1984E&PSL..67...70S. doi:10.1016/0012-821X(84)90039-6.
- Sverjensky, Dimitri A. (1 February 1984). "Oil field brines as ore-forming solutions". Economic Geology. 79 (1): 23–37. Bibcode:1984EcGeo..79...23S. doi:10.2113/gsecongeo.79.1.23.
- Shock, Everett L; Helgeson, Harold C; Sverjensky, Dimitri A (September 1989). "Calculation of the thermodynamic and transport properties of aqueous species at high pressures and temperatures: Standard partial molal properties of inorganic neutral species". Geochimica et Cosmochimica Acta. 53 (9): 2157–2183. Bibcode:1989GeCoA..53.2157S. doi:10.1016/0016-7037(89)90341-4.
- Sverjensky, Dimitri A.; Sahai, Nita (October 1996). "Theoretical prediction of single-site surface-protonation equilibrium constants for oxides and silicates in water". Geochimica et Cosmochimica Acta. 60 (20): 3773–3797. Bibcode:1996GeCoA..60.3773S. doi:10.1016/0016-7037(96)00207-4.
- Sverjensky, D.A.; Shock, E.L.; Helgeson, H.C. (April 1997). "Prediction of the thermodynamic properties of aqueous metal complexes to 1000°C and 5 kb". Geochimica et Cosmochimica Acta. 61 (7): 1359–1412. Bibcode:1997GeCoA..61.1359S. doi:10.1016/S0016-7037(97)00009-4. PMID 11541435.

== Awards and honors ==
- 2021: Fellow of the American Geophysical Union
- 2011: Fellow of the Geochemical Society and the European Association of Geochemistry
- 1988: Waldemar Lindgren Award (Society of Economic Geologists)
