= Jie (Jackie) Li =

Scientist

Dr. Jie (Jackie) Li is a scientist and Professor at the University of Michigan.

== Career ==
Li received her MA in geophysics in 1997 from Harvard University where she completed her Ph.D. in Earth and Planetary Sciences in 1998. She is a professor in Geochemistry and Mineral Physics at the University of Michigan. Li's research includes carbon at high pressures and the origin and evolution of terrestrial plants, terrestrial-like moons and asteroids in the Solar System. Research topics that she is engaged in are:

1. Light element composition of the Earth's core
2. Spin state of iron in the Earth's lower mantle
3. State of Mercury's core and the origin of its magnetic field
4. Core formation during the early history of the Earth
5. Formation of the Earth's continental crust

Li is a member of the Extreme Physics and Chemistry Community Scientific Steering Committee of the Deep Carbon Observatory.

== Notes and references ==
- Most of Earth's carbon may be hidden in the planet's inner core, new model suggests
