= Michael Walter =

Michael Walter may refer to:

- Michael Walter (American football) (born 1960), American football player
- Michael Walter (luger) (1959–2016), East German luger
- Mick Walter, English actor
- Michael J. Walter, American experimental petrologist

== See also ==
- Michael Walters (disambiguation)
