= Katrina Edwards =

American geomicrobiologist

Katrina Jane Edwards
- Born: March 15, 1968
- Died: October 26, 2014 (aged 46)
- Other names: Mistress of the Dark World
- Scientific career
- Fields: Geomicrobiology

Katrina Jane Edwards (15 March 1968 - 26 October 2014) was a pioneering geomicrobiologist known for her studies of organisms living below the ocean floor, specifically exploring the interactions between the microbes and their geological surroundings, and how global processes were influenced by these interactions. She spearheaded the Center for Dark Energy Biosphere Investigation (C-DEBI) project at the University of Southern California, which is ongoing. Edwards also helped organize the deep biosphere research community by heading the Fe-Oxidizing Microbial Observatory Project on Loihi Seamount, and serving on several program steering committees involving ocean drilling. Edwards taught at the Woods Hole Oceanographic Institution (WHOI) and later became a professor at the University of Southern California.^{[1][2]}

== Life and education ==
Katrina Edwards was born the third of five children on March 15, 1968, in Columbus, Ohio, to Sandra and Timothy Edwards. At Columbus Alternative High School Katrina completed her secondary education, and pursued an early career at the Delaware Municipal Airport in general airport operations and later as a chief flight instructor. While continuing her work at the airport, Edwards attended Ohio State University to pursue an undergraduate degree in geology. In 1994, she received her bachelor's degree with honors.

In 1996 Edwards left her work at the airport to attend the University of Wisconsin, Madison where she studied geochemistry, mineralogy, microbiology, oceanography, molecular biology and ecology. There she earned a master's in geology with emphasis on isotope geochemistry and in 1999 she earned the first Ph.D. in geomicrobiology awarded by the university. It was also at UW-Madison she met her future husband. In 1999 Edwards moved to Massachusetts to join Woods Hole Oceanographic Institute. There she established a geomicrobiology lab, which focused on the microbial transformation and degradation of solid Earth materials, specifically rocks, minerals, and organic matter.

Katrina Edwards died on October 26, 2014, at the age of 46. Edwards is survived by her parents, her siblings, and her three children.

== Work and discoveries ==
While at Woods Hole Oceanographic Institution, Edwards was an associate scientist in geochemistry and marine chemistry. In 2006, she began working at the University of Southern California (USC). There she was a professor in the environmental studies, earth sciences, and biological sciences departments and became a mentor for many students and postdoctoral researchers. In 2009, she helped established the Center for Dark Energy Biosphere Investigations (C-DEBI) at USC. Creation of the technology center was done in partnership with USC, national laboratories, and several major research universities and was supported by the National Science Foundation (NSF) with a $29 million grant. Since then, the Deep Carbon Observatory is also continuing to organize collaborative work on biological activity in the deep subsurface.

Edwards, as founding director and principal investigator of C-DEBI, worked with other scientists and led multiple expeditions in the North Atlantic Ocean, including international projects to explore the ocean's crust through deep drilling. She also headed the Fe-Oxidizing Microbial Observatory Project on Loihi Seamount, which was supported by the NSF. The goal of these expeditions was to gather information about the role of intraterrestrials (organisms living under the sea floor or inside the earth) and their role in what she called "the tooth decay of the solid Earth," otherwise known as the degradation and transformation of Earth solid minerals and organic matter.

Edwards authored over 100 published papers, contributed to and edited several microbiology textbooks, served as the associate editor of American Mineralogist, and served on the editorial boards of Environmental Microbiology, Geobiology and Geomicrobiology journals. Her 2000 paper, "An Archaeal Iron-oxidizing Extreme Acidophile Important in Acid Mine Drainage" featured as the cover story in the journal Science. Edwards also published a blog on Scientific American's website, relating the experiences of her team so members of the public could follow the events as they occurred during a research expedition in the Mid-Atlantic Ocean.

=== Iron transformation pathways of intraterrestrials ===
Edwards studied intraterrestrial transformation pathways (metabolic processes) of iron (Fe) in sulfide-mineral deposits and the effects of their metabolic reactions on their surroundings. Because of its abundance, dynamic solubility, and oxidation-reduction properties, iron is an important element in the biochemistry of mid-ocean ridge hydrothermal systems. It is abundant in most fluids discharged from hydrothermal vents. Iron plumed from hydrothermal vents in sulfide mineral deposits precipitate (form a solid) with sulfur (S). The precipitate then becomes part of the physical structure of the sulfide deposit. Iron also has the potential to act as the substrate for microbial metabolism and respiration. This means that it can be reduced during a microbial process that uses it in the place of oxygen to create energy. This and other studies by Edwards have revealed how microbes can live deep in the Earth's crust in bedrock that was previously thought to be devoid of life.

== Awards and recognition ==
Edwards was elected a fellow of the American Academy of Microbiology in 2010 and the American Association for the Advancement of Science in 2011. In 2012, she became the third woman to receive one of the highest honors for those working in ocean science, the Royal Society of Canada's A.G. Huntsman Award for Excellence in Marine Science.
