= John Baross =

American marine microbiologist

John A. Baross
- Born: August 27, 1940 (age 86)
- Education: University of Washington, San Francisco State University
- Spouse: Jody Deming
- Awards: Fellow of the American Academy of Microbiology, 2021 NASA Exceptional Scientific Achievement Medal
- Scientific career
- Doctoral advisor: John Liston
- Doctoral students: Julie Huber, Matthew O. Schrenk

John A. Baross (born August 27, 1940) is an American marine microbiologist and professor of oceanography and astrobiology at the University of Washington who has made significant discoveries in the field of the microbial ecology of hydrothermal vents and the physiology of thermophilic bacteria and archaea.

== Education and academic career ==
Baross earned Bachelor of Science degrees in Microbiology and Chemistry from San Francisco State University in 1965. He earned an MS and Ph.D. in Microbiology from the University of Washington in 1973. At Oregon State University, he was a postdoctoral researcher (1973-1977), an assistant professor (1977-1983), and an associate professor (1983-1985). He moved to the University of Washington in 1985 and has been a full professor there since 1995. He was one of the founding members of the University of Washington Astrobiology program.

== Discoveries on volcanic microbial habitats ==
Baross was one of the first to show that thermophilic microbes grow in deep-sea hydrothermal vents, work that involved incubating samples on the research vessel's engine block. His research group has studied microorganisms at Axial Seamount, North Gorda Ridge, and the CoAxial Segment in the Northeast Pacific Ocean, and Lost City Hydrothermal Field.

Baross was among the first microbiologists to sample Mt. St. Helens after it erupted in 1980; this research revealed the succession of anaerobic microorganisms in volcanic lakes after the eruption and the importance of the nitrogen cycle in the restoration of the lakes to their former states.

== Astrobiology ==
Baross' research focuses on extreme environments, particularly volcanic environments, and implications for the origin of life. He was among the first to propose hydrothermal vents as a site for the origin of life. He has coined the term ‘ribofilm’ – a proto-biofilm that may have acted as the first living organism. Baross advocates the idea that key metabolic pathways, in particular those involving metalloenzymes, are rooted in geochemical reactions on mineral surfaces. He is therefore a major proponent for the exploration of icy moons like Enceladus which was discovered to be geochemically active and may favor the production of essential biomolecules. His recent contributions stress the importance of an environmentally diverse planetary surface with active hydrological and geological cycles as an ideal setting for prebiotic reaction networks.

Baross chaired two National Academy of Sciences task groups on origins of life topics: the Committee on the Origins and Evolution of Life (2000-2004) and the Group on the Limits of Organic Life in the Universe (2004-2007). These groups explored the possibility of a "weird life" based on alternative substrates. He has served on six national and international planetary protection committees. He is the co-author of the textbook "Planets and Life: The Emerging Science of Astrobiology."

== Service and honors ==
Baross is a Fellow of the American Academy of Microbiology, chair of the Steering Committee of the International Census of Marine Microbes, and involved in the collection of the hydrothermal vent sulfide chimneys on display at the American Museum of Natural History. He was the 2021 recipient of the NASA Exceptional Scientific Achievement Medal and was the featured scientist for December 2021 in the 2021 NASA Science Calendar.
