= Michael Waters =

Michael or Mike Waters may refer to:

- Michael Waters (writer) (born 1949), American writer
- Mick Waters (education) (born 1949), British educational theorist
- Mick Waters (hurler) (born 1941), Irish hurler
- Mike Waters (American football) (born 1962), American football player
- Mike Waters (politician) (born 1967), South African politician
- Michael R. Waters, professor of anthropology and geography
- Mike Waters, wrestler with professional wrestling tag team the UK Pitbulls
- Mikey Waters, a fictional character played by River Phoenix in Gus Van Sant's 1991 film My Own Private Idaho

== See also ==
- Michael Walters (disambiguation)
