= Matthew O. Schrenk =

Matthew Schrenk is an associate professor in geomicrobiology at Michigan State University. His research focuses on the diversity, distribution, and activities of microorganisms in the deep subsurface biosphere. His work couples molecular biological approaches and geochemical analyses to investigate microbial ecosystems. Schrenk investigates high pH environments fueled by underground serpentinization reactions between water and certain rock types and hydrothermal vent systems along the ocean floor that are driven by volcanic activity.

Schrenk earned his master's degree in 2001 and PhD in 2005 from the School of Oceanography at the University of Washington. He completed his postdoctoral research in the Department of Terrestrial Magnetism and the Geophysical Laboratory at the Carnegie Institution of Washington from 2005 to 2008 before becoming an assistant professor at Michigan State University. In 2012, he was awarded a $50,000 Sloan Research Fellowship from the Alfred P. Sloan Foundation, a prestigious two-year award given to honor ocean sciences researchers. Schrenk serves on the Deep Life Scientific Steering Committee for the Deep Carbon Observatory (DCO).
