= Terry Plank =

Geologist and volcanologist

Terry Ann Plank
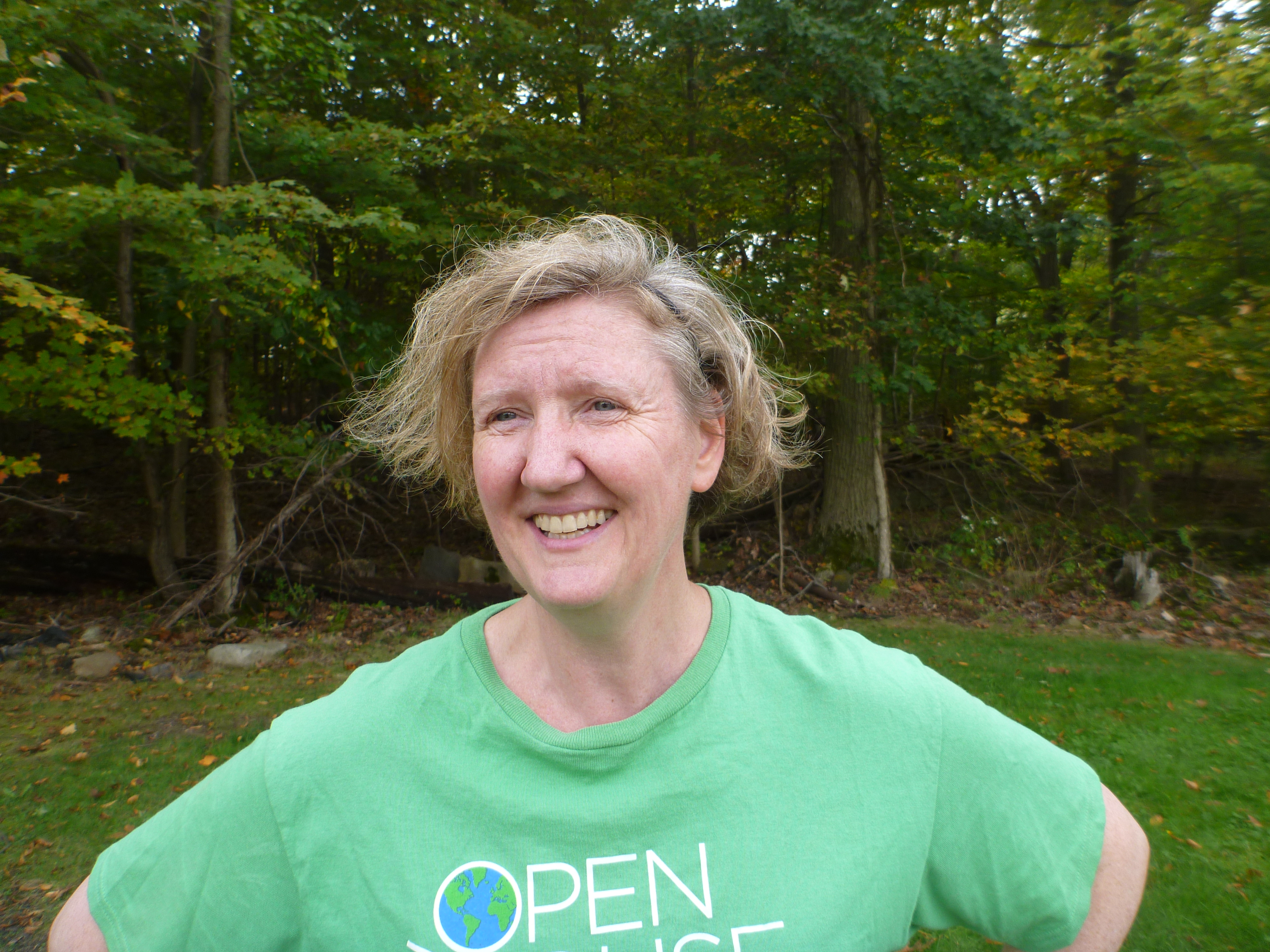
- Born: 1963 (age 62–63); Wilmington, Delaware
- Education: Dartmouth College, Columbia University/Lamont Doherty Earth Observatory
- Awards: MacArthur Fellow
- Scientific career
- Fields: Geochemistry; Volcanism
- Workplaces: Columbia University / Lamont Doherty Earth Observatory
- Doctoral advisor: Charles H. Langmuir

Terry Ann Plank is an American geochemist, volcanologist and professor of earth science at Columbia College, Columbia University, and the Lamont Doherty Earth Observatory. She is a 2012 MacArthur Fellow and member of the National Academy of Sciences. Her most prominent work involves the crystal chemistry of lava minerals (mostly olivines) in order to determine magma ages and movement, giving clues to how quickly magma can surface as lava in volcanoes. Most notably, Plank is known for her work establishing a stronger link between the subduction of ocean sediments and volcanism at ocean arcs. Her current work can be seen at her website.
Plank states that her interest in volcanoes began when her Dartmouth professor took her and other students to Arenal volcano in Costa Rica. He had them sit and have lunch while on top of a slow-moving lava flow and while watching bright red goops of lava crack out from their black casings. "It was totally cool, how could you not like that?" Plank recalled the event to State of the Planet, an Earth Institute News source at Columbia University.

== Education ==
Plank was born in Wilmington, Delaware. As a child, she grew up in a schist quarry and was the youngest member of the Delaware Mineralogical Society in third grade. She graduated from Tatnall High School in 1981 and then graduated summa cum laude in Earth Sciences from Dartmouth College in 1985 with her thesis Magmatic Garnets from the Cardigan Pluton, NH under the supervision of John B. Lyons. She received her Ph.D. in Geosciences with distinction in 1993 from Columbia University, Lamont–Doherty Earth Observatory with her thesis Mantle Melting and Crustal Recycling at Subduction Zones under the advising of Charles H. Langmuir.

== Career ==
Beginning a postdoctoral career at Cornell University, Plank worked under the supervision of W.M. White from 1993 to 1995. From there, Plank became an assistant professor at the University of Kansas from 1995 to 1999. There, she collaborated with her PhD advisor from Columbia (Langmuir) to work on her most cited publication, The chemical composition of subducting sediment and its consequences for the crust and mantle (see below). From 1999 to 2007, Plank was a professor of earth sciences at Boston University (associate professor from 1999 to 2005 and professor from 2005 to 2007). Since 2008, Plank has been at Columbia University in New York, New York, appointed as an Arthur D. Storke Memorial Professor in their Earth and Environmental Science Department. Plank has held two visiting professor positions in France: summer 1998 at the University of Rennes in Rennes and summer 2002 at the Universite Joseph Fourier in Grenoble.

Plank has also been instrumental in establishing the AVERT (Anticipating Volcanic Eruptions in Real-Time) project, funded by the Gordon and Betty Moore Foundation, which aims to deploy open-data, real-time, multi-sensor monitoring networks on active volcanoes across a range of settings worldwide. A central challenge the project addresses is that seismic, geodetic, and gas-flux data — each capable of revealing precursory eruption signals — have rarely been collected together in real-time to build forecasts. Initial deployments focused on the Alaskan volcanoes Okmok and Cleveland, with later work expanding to Poás volcano in Costa Rica in partnership with OVSICORI.

== Research focus ==
Every rock has a story to tell.

— Terry Plank

She has spent her career researching magma and volcanoes. One specific area of her research is how the chemical composition of magma and crystals that form during eruption can provide information about the amount of water present during the eruption and explain how explosive it was. She uses microanalysis and modeling of volatile diffusion along small melt tubes and embayments, found in olivine crystals. She has done field work around the ring of fire, Philippines, Nicaragua, Iceland, and across the southwest United States as well as the Aleutian Islands. Plank serves on the executive committee of the Deep Carbon Observatory.
Two of her other main research contributions have been to the understanding of magma generation and crustal recycling at subduction zones. This is accomplished by geochemical observation of olivine minerals present in lavas. Her research focuses on magmas that evolve due to the plate tectonic cycle, namely subduction zones. More specifically, Plank has published notable papers tracing sediments from sea floors to their ultimate end as lava from arc volcanoes. This 'creation' of magma from sediments, how sediments decompress and at what temperature and water content, has remained the research in which she is most invested and interested.
One of Planks most notable works came from a collaboration with Langmuir in 1998. Not only did The chemical composition and its consequences for the crust and mantle provided a linkage in chemical composition between subducting ocean sediment and the composition of lava from arc volcanoes, but also it called for a development of a global subducting sediment (GLOSS) composition and flux similar to upper continental crust (UCC). Plank has since updated GLOSS to GLOSS-II in her 2014 publication, Chemical composition of subducting sediments.
In one of her most recent papers, Thermal structure and melting conditions in the mantle beneath the Basin and Range province from seismology and petrology, a collaboration with D.W. Forsyth, Plank revised a mantle-melt thermobarometer. They did this revision to show more precise pressure and temperature equilibrium estimates of mantle melt in the Basin and Range region of the United States.

== Awards ==
Plank was presented with the John Ebers Geology Award while at Dartmouth College. In 1998, Plank received the Houtermans Medal from the European Association for Geochemistry as well as the Donath Medal from the Geological Society of America. In 2012, Plank was awarded the MacArthur Genius Grant and the following year was elected to the National Academy of Sciences. She received an honorary Doctor of Science degree from Dartmouth in 2015, and in 2016 was elected into the American Academy of Arts and Sciences. She received the Wollaston Medal of the Geological Society of London in 2018.

== Fellowships ==
- Fellow of the Geochemical Society, 2011
- Fellow of the Mineralogical Society of America, 2009
- Fellow of the American Geophysical Union, 2008
- Fellow of the Geological Society of America, 1998
- National Science Foundation Postdoctoral Fellowship, 1993–1994
- National Science Foundation Graduate Fellowship, 1985–1988
- JOI/USSAC Ocean Drilling Program Fellowship, 1988–1990
- Summer Undergraduate Research Fellow, GSO University Rhode Island, 1984

== Selected publications ==
- Thermal Structure and Melting Conditions in the Mantle beneath the Basin and Range Province from Seismology and Petrology. Plank, T.; D. W. Forsyth. Geochemistry, Geophysics, Geosystems, vol. 17, no. 4, 2016, pp. 1312–1338. (2016)
- The Chemical Composition of Subducting Sediments. Plank, T. in: H.D. Holland, K.K. Turekian (Eds.), The Crust, Treatise on Geochemistry (second ed.)4, Elsevier, Oxford (2014), pp. 607–629.
- NanoSIMS results from olivine-hosted melt embayments: Magma ascent rate during explosive basaltic eruptions. Lloyd, A.S; Plank, T; Ruprecht, P; Hauri, E.H., Rose, W; Gonnermann, H.M. Journal of Volcanology and Geothermal Research Volume: 283 p.: 1-18 (2014).
- Melting during late-stage rifting in Afar is hot and deep Ferguson, D. J.; Maclennan, J.; Bastow, I. D.; Pyle, D. M.; Jones, S. M., Keir; D., Blundy, J. D.; Plank, T.; Yirgu, G. Nature 07/2013 Volume: 499 p.: 70-73 (2013) 0.1038/nature12292
- Why do mafic arc magmas contain ~4 wt% water on average? Plank, T., Kelley, K.A., †Zimmer, M.M., Hauri, E.H. and Wallace, P.J. Earth and Planetary Science Letters, Frontiers Article Volume: 364 p.: 168-179 (2013)
- Feeding andesitic eruptions with a high-speed connection from the mantle. Ruprecht, P. and Plank, T. Nature Volume: 50 p.: 68-72 (2013) doi:10.1038/nature12342
- The Hf-Nd isotopic composition of marine sediments. Vervoort, Jeff D.; Plank, Terry; Prytulak, Julie Geochimica Et Cosmochimica Acta 10/2011 Volume: 75 p.: 5903-5926 (2011)
- Emerging geothermometers for estimating slab surface temperatures. Plank, T.; Cooper, L.; Manning; C.E. Nature Geoscience Volume: 2 p.: 611-615 (2009)
