= Terrestrial biological carbon cycle =

Interconnection between carbon, hydrogen and oxygen cycle in metabolism of photosynthesizing plants

The carbon cycle is an essential part of life on Earth. About half the dry weight of most living organisms is carbon. It plays an important role in the structure, biochemistry, and nutrition of all living cells. Living biomass holds about 550 gigatons of carbon, most of which is made of terrestrial plants (wood), while some 1,200 gigatons of carbon are stored in the terrestrial biosphere as dead biomass.

Carbon is cycled through the terrestrial biosphere with varying speeds, depending on what form it is stored in and under which circumstances. It is exchanged most quickly with the atmosphere, although small amounts of carbon leave the terrestrial biosphere and enter the oceans as dissolved organic carbon (DOC).

== Movement of carbon in the terrestrial biosphere ==
Most carbon in the terrestrial biosphere is stored in forests: they hold 86% of the planet's terrestrial above-ground carbon and forest soils also hold 73% of the planet's soil carbon. Carbon stored inside plants can be transferred into other organisms during plant consumption. When animals eat plants, for example, the organic carbon stored in the plants is converted into other forms and utilized inside the animals. The same is true for bacteria and other heterotrophs. Dead plant material in or above soils remains there for some time before being respired by heterotrophs. Thus carbon is transferred in every step of the food chain from one organism to another.

== Carbon exchange between the terrestrial biosphere and other systems ==
=== Atmosphere ===
Autotrophs, such as trees and other green plants, use photosynthesis to convert carbon dioxide into carbohydrates during primary production. In the process, they split water molecules, releasing oxygen as a byproduct. This process occurs most quickly in ecosystems with high amounts of growth, such as in young forests. Because carbon is consumed in the process of autotrophic growth, more carbon is consumed in spring and summer during daytime than in winter and at night, when photosynthesis no longer takes place in most plants. Carbon storage in the biosphere is influenced by a number of processes on different time-scales: while carbon uptake through autotrophic respiration follows a diurnal and seasonal cycle, carbon can be stored in the terrestrial biosphere for up to several centuries, e.g. in wood or soil.

Plants also secrete chemicals that break down rock particles, which both aid nutrient uptake from the soil and require CO_{2} for their production, increasing the plant's demand for atmospheric CO_{2}.

Most carbon leaves the terrestrial biosphere through respiration. When oxygen is present, aerobic respiration occurs, producing carbon dioxide. If oxygen is not present, e.g. as is the case in marshes or in animals' digestive tracts, anaerobic respiration can occur, which produces methane. About half of the gross primary production is respired by plants directly back into the atmosphere. Part of the net primary production, or the remaining carbon absorbed by the biosphere, is emitted back into the atmosphere through fires and heterotrophic respiration. The rest is converted into soil organic carbon, which is released more slowly, or "inert" dissolved carbon, which can remain in the biosphere for an unknown period of time.

This can be a very vital aspect to have in life as it will work to promote all kinds of living things to co-exist within an ecosystem. The role of Carbon within a Terrestrial Ecosystem consists of Carbon being stored within plants which will eventually be deposited in other forms for other organisms to absorb and consume.

=== Geosphere ===
Carbon in the terrestrial biosphere enters the geosphere only through highly specialized processes. When anaerobic decomposition converts organic material into hydrocarbon rich materials and is then deposited as sediment, the carbon can enter the geosphere through tectonic processes and remain there for several million years. This process can lead to the creation of fossil fuels.

=== Anthropogenic influences ===
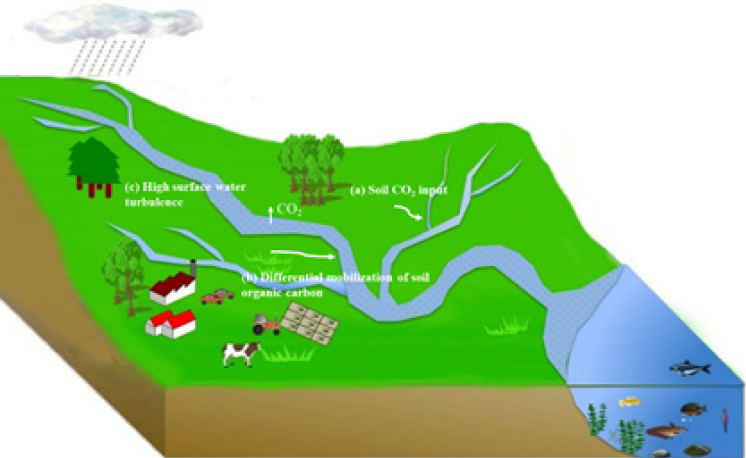
Carbon dioxide emission from streams and rivers as an integrative part of terrestrial respiration. The disproportional role of streams and rivers in emitting terrestrial carbon to the atmosphere is strengthened by: (a) high input of soil CO_{2} to streams and small rivers (b) differential transport of organic rich soils to streams and rivers (c) high turbulence in streams and rivers that facilitates quick evasion of the gas to the atmosphere.

Human activity has large effects on the terrestrial biosphere, changing the way that it acts as a carbon reservoir. Anthropogenically caused fires release large amounts of carbon as CO_{2} directly into the atmosphere. More significantly, however, humans modify land cover. Land cover change greatly decreases the amount of carbon uptake in the terrestrial biosphere. It modifies the local ecosystem, often replacing carbon-rich forest with agricultural or urban land use. This releases the carbon stored in the former land cover type and simultaneously decreases the biosphere's ability to absorb carbon from the atmosphere.

Indirectly, human-induced changes in the global climate cause widespread modifications to the terrestrial ecosystem's function in the carbon cycle. As local climates transition, locations that have long been conducive to one type of ecosystem can become more favorable for other ecosystem types. For example, warming in the Arctic has caused stress in North American boreal forests, thus decreasing primary production and carbon uptake, while the same warmer temperatures have led to increased shrub growth in the same areas, producing an opposite effect. Changes in weather patterns can also affect animals. For example, changed weather patterns may create favorable conditions for pine beetles, leading to large beetle outbreaks and forest destruction. Modified precipitation patterns can also lead to droughts or extreme precipitation events, causing additional stress for ecosystems and more erosion. Not only do such influences on the terrestrial ecosystem modify its carbon exchange with the atmosphere - they also can lead to increased outwashing of carbon into the oceans through the transport of organic material in rivers. These widespread changes in land cover also causes changes to the planetary albedo, inducing complex feedbacks in the Earth's planetary radiation budget.

Higher CO_{2} levels in the atmosphere can cause photosynthesis to take place more efficiently, thus increasing plant growth and primary production. This could lead to the biosphere extracting more carbon dioxide from the atmosphere. How long this carbon would remain sequestered in the terrestrial biosphere before being rereleased into the atmosphere is unclear, however, and it is likely that other limiting factors (e.g. nitrogen availability, moisture, etc.) would prevent CO_{2} fertilization from significantly increasing primary production.

== See also ==
Deep Carbon Observatory
