= Isabelle Daniel =

French geologist & researcher

Isabelle Daniel is a mineralogist at the Claude Bernard University Lyon 1 in Lyon, France. She studies minerals under extreme conditions, such as those that exist in Earth's mantle, as well as biosignatures of early life.

== Education ==
Daniel earned a bachelor's degree in Earth sciences from the École Normale Supérieure de Lyon in 1989, and a master's degree from the same department in 1992. She completed her doctorate in Earth sciences at Université Claude Bernard Lyon 1 in 1995, with a project entitled “Aluminosilicates at high pressure and high temperature: amorph, glass, liquid and crystal – A Raman spectroscopic study.”

== Career ==
In 2003, Daniel was a fellow of the Mineralogical Society of America and in 2007 she was a fellow of the Institut Universitaire de France.

Currently, Daniel is a professor of Earth sciences at the Université Claude Bernard Lyon 1 in France, where she is affiliated with the Laboratoire de Géologie de Lyon and is the Dean of the Observatory of Earth Sciences and Astrophysics of Lyon. Daniel is a member of the American Geophysical Union and the Deep Carbon Observatory, where she is chair of the Deep Energy Scientific Steering Committee. From 2012 to 2016 she served as a councilor for the Mineralogical Society of America. She is now the vice president of the European Mineralogical Union, with a four-year term that will expire in 2020. In 2018 she was co-chair of the Deep Carbon Science in the Context of Geologic Time Gordon Research Conference.

=== Research initiatives ===
Daniel's research focuses on minerals and fluid-rock interactions under extreme pressure and temperature conditions. In 2013 she reported that the mineral olivine rapidly splits water into hydrogen and water in a process called serpentinization, which commonly occurs at mid-ocean ridges. She is also interested in the types of volatile compounds that occur in subduction zones, and how those compounds are recycled.

Her lab also investigates microbial biosignatures and how mineral surfaces may have impacted the emergence of life on early Earth. She is exploring the physical limits of microbial life and microbes that live under extreme conditions.

In her work, she frequently uses advanced experimental and analytical methods including Raman spectroscopy and synchrotron X-ray diffraction.

== Additional sources ==
- Hydrogen squeezed from stone could be new energy source
