= Michael Walters (disambiguation) =

Michael Walters (born 1991) is an Australian footballer

Michael Walters may also refer to:

- Michael P. Walters (born 1956), North Carolina politician
- Mike Walters (born 1957), Major League Baseball pitcher
- Michael Walters, Edmonton City Council councilman for Edmonton, Alberta
- Michael Walters, a character in the video game Tom Clancy's Rainbow Six: Vegas
- Mick Walters, English footballer

== See also ==
- Michael Walter (disambiguation)
- Michael Waters (disambiguation)
