= Biogeophysics =

Biogeophysics is a subdiscipline of geophysics concerned with how plants, microbial activity and other organisms alter geologic materials and affect geophysical signatures.

== Introduction ==
The activities of the microbes are measured using geophysical imaging techniques. A lot of these techniques are based on the measurement of electric potential anomalies, which in this case can arise from microbes, their growth, metabolic by-products, and microbially mediated processes. The primary way in which these anomalies are generated can be explained by the electrical double layer. The effects are most visible when low frequency field is used as the surface charge of microbes is of low mobility.

== See also ==
- Astrobiology
- Biogeology
- Exploration geophysics
- Geomicrobiology
- Near-surface geophysics
