= Roland Winter =

Roland Winter (born 1954) is a biophysical chemist who studies the structure, dynamics, energetics, and phase behavior of biological membranes and proteins. He was dean of the Department of Chemistry and Chemical Biology at Technical University of Dortmund, Germany.

== Career ==
Winter received his diploma in Chemistry in 1979 and his PhD in Physical Chemistry in 1982 at the Technical University of Karlsruhe. He went on to be a postdoctoral fellow at the University of Marburg and spent a year as a visiting scientist in the Department of Chemistry at the University of Illinois at Urbana-Champaign from 1987 to 1988. Winter then became a professor at Ruhr-University Bochum and in 1993 joined the faculty of Technical University of Dortmund as chair of Biophysical Chemistry. Winter is an executive board member of the German Center of Excellence RESOLV (Ruhr Explores Solvation), where he heads the research area "Connecting Solvation Dynamics with Biomolecular Function." He received the Dozenten-Price of the Fonds der Chemischen Industrie award in 1992. Winter is a member of the Deep Life Scientific Steering Committee for the Deep Carbon Observatory (DCO) and serves on the editorial boards of Biophysical Chemistry, Journal of Non-Equilibrium Thermodynamics, Zeitschrift für Physikalische Chemie and Chemie in unserer Zeit.

== Research Initiatives ==
Winter studies membrane biophysics with an emphasis on the energetics and phase behavior of lipid membranes and the interaction between model biomembranes and proteins involved in cell signaling processes. He also investigates the effects of high pressure on lipid membranes and proteins.
