= Kai-Uwe Hinrichs =

German biogeochemist and organic geochemist

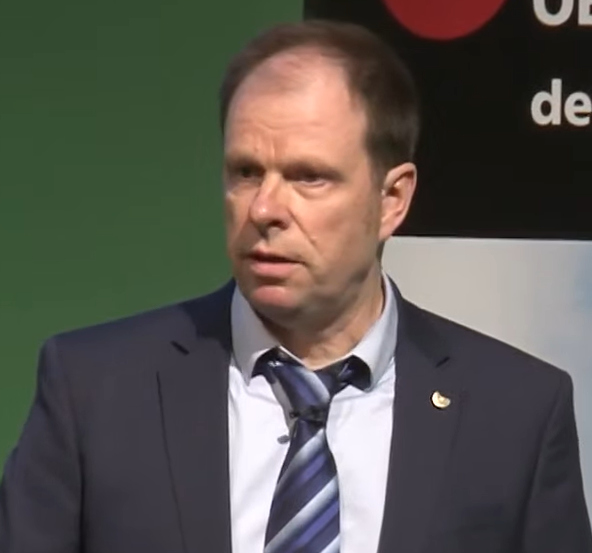
Hinrichs in 2019

Kai-Uwe Hinrichs is a German biogeochemist and organic geochemist known for his research of microbial life below the ocean bed – the deep biosphere.

He earned his PhD in organic geochemistry from University of Oldenburg in Germany in 1997. He teaches and conducts research at University of Bremen as head, Organic Chemistry Group at the MARUM Center for Marine Environmental Sciences. Hinrichs was co-chief scientist of Japan Agency for Marine-Earth Science and Technology (JAMSTEC) Expedition 337 on board the drilling vessel Chikyū, which set a world record for scientific drilling, reaching 2,111 meters below the seafloor off Shimokita Peninsula of Japan in the northwest Pacific Ocean. Hinrichs serves on the Executive Committee of the Deep Carbon Observatory. Since 2011, Hinrichs has been a member of the Board of Reviewing Editors of Science.

== Honors ==
In 2011, Hinrichs was awarded the Gottfried Wilhelm Leibniz Prize by the Deutsche Forschungsgemeinschaft. Hinrichs is also a two-times recipient of the Advanced Grant by the European Research Council (DARCLIFE project, 2009 competition; ZooMecular project, 2014 competition).
