= Deep Earth Carbon Degassing Project =

Scientific project studying carbon transfer from Earth's interior

The Deep Earth Carbon Degassing (DECADE) project is an initiative to quantify the amount of carbon outgassed from the Earth's deep interior (core, mantle, crust) into the surface environment (e.g. biosphere, hydrosphere, cryosphere, atmosphere) through naturally occurring processes. DECADE is an initiative within the Deep Carbon Observatory (DCO).

Volcanoes are the main pathway in which deeply sourced volatiles, including carbon, are transferred from the Earth's interior to the surface environment. An additional, though less well understood, pathway includes along faults and fractures within the Earth's crust, often referred to as tectonic degassing. When the DCO was first formed in 2009 estimates of global carbon flux from volcanic regions ranged from 65 to 540 Mt/yr, and constraints on global tectonic degassing were virtually unknown. The order of magnitude uncertainty in current volcanic/tectonic carbon outgassing makes answering fundamental questions about the global carbon budget virtually impossible. In particular, one fundamental unknown is if carbon transferred to the Earth's interior via subduction is efficiently recycled back to the Earth's mantle lithosphere, crust and surface environment through volcanic and tectonic degassing, or if significant quantities of carbon are being subducted into the deep mantle. Because significant quantities of mantle carbon are also released through mid-ocean ridge volcanism, if carbon inputs and outputs at subduction zone settings are in balance, then the net effect will be an imbalance in the global carbon budget, with carbon being preferentially removed from the Earth's deep interior and redistributed to more shallow reservoirs including the mantle lithosphere, crust, hydrosphere and atmosphere. The implications of this may mean that carbon concentrations in the surface environment have increased over Earth's history, which has a significant impact on climate change.

The project studies how carbon cycles through deep Earth, and patterns in volcanic emissions data could potentially alert scientists to an impending eruption.

== Project goals ==
The project's goal is to refine estimates of global carbon outgassing. The project draws on geochemistry, petrology and volcanology to provide constraints on the global volcanic carbon flux by 1) establishing a database of volcanic and hydrothermal gas compositions and fluxes linked to EarthChem/PetDB and the Smithsonian Global Volcanism Program, 2) building a global monitoring network to measure the volcanic carbon flux of 20 active volcanoes continuously, 3) measure the carbon flux of remote volcanoes, for which no or only sparse data are currently available; 4) developing new field and analytical instrumentation for carbon measurements and flux monitoring, and 5) establishing formal collaborations with volcano observatories around the world to support volcanic gas measurement and monitoring activities.

== History ==
The DECADE initiative was conceived in September 2011 by the International Association of Volcanology and Chemistry of the Earth's Interior Commission on the Chemistry of Volcanic Gases during its 11th field workshop. Here the charge of the initiative was broadly defined and the governance structure established. The DECADE receives financial support from Deep Carbon Observatory to meet the project goals, with support distributed to DECADE members based on project proposal submission and external review and/or consensus by the board of directors. All projects are significantly matched by funding sources from the individual investigators or other funding agencies. The initiative is led by a board of directors that has nine members including one chair and two co-vice chairs. Currently, the DECADE initiative has around 80 members from 13 countries.

== Achievements ==
As of 2025, work supported or partially supported by the initiative includes:

- Modification of the IEDA EarthChem database to include volcanic gas composition and gas flux data.
- Instrumenting 9 volcanoes (Masaya Volcano, Turrialba Volcano, Poás Volcano, Nevado del Ruiz, Galeras, Villarrica (instruments destroyed by eruption), Popocatépetl, Mount Merapi, Whakaari / White Island) with permanent multi-component gas analyzer system (Multi-GAS) stations for near continuous CO_{2} and SO_{2} measurements and near continuous SO_{2} flux measurements using miniDOAS.
- Quantification of volcanic gas emissions and compositions from remote regions such as the Aleutian, Vanuatu and Papua New Guinea volcanic arcs.
- First measurements of gas emissions from Mount Bromo and Anak Krakatau Volcanoes, Krakatoa Indonesia.
- Establishing volcanic gas chemical changes as eruption precursors at Poás and Turrialba Volcanoes, Costa Rica.
- Airborne sampling of volcanic plumes for carbon isotopes and analyses using Delta Ray Infrared Isotope Spectrometer.
- Determination of diffuse CO_{2} degassing in the Azores.
- Quantification of global CO_{2} emissions from volcanoes during eruptions, passive degassing and diffuse degassing

== Volcanoes ==
The following volcanoes are currently monitored by the DECADE initiative:

Volcano	Country	Notes
Masaya Volcano	Nicaragua	
Popocatépetl	Mexico	
Galeras	Colombia	
Nevado del Ruiz	Colombia	
Villarrica Volcano	Chile	Equipment was destroyed by Villarrica's 2015 eruption.
Turrialba	Costa Rica	
Poás	Costa Rica	
Mount Merapi	Indonesia	
White Island	New Zealand	

=== Map of the DCO DECADE project volcano installations ===
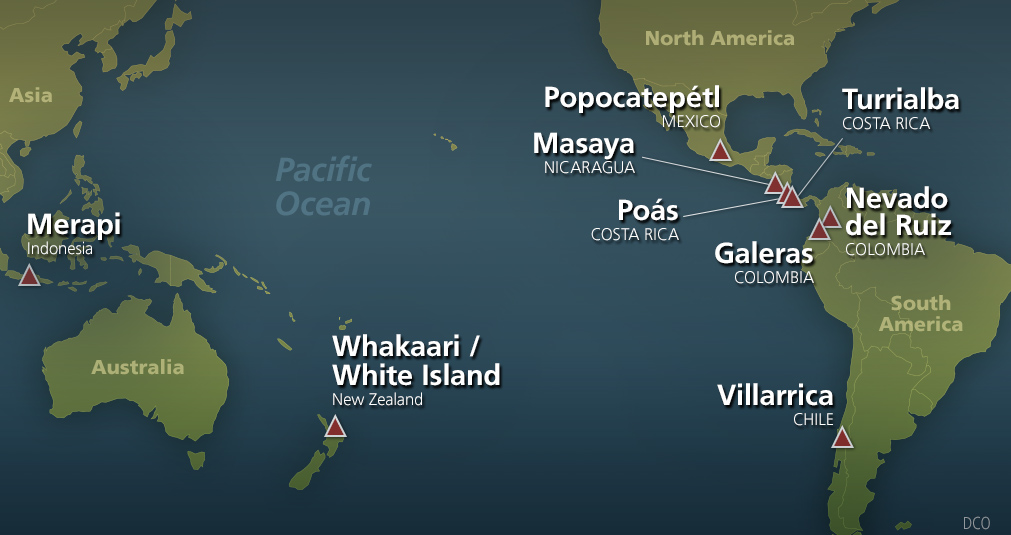

== See also ==
- Decade Volcanoes – Set of volcanoes considered especially dangerous
- Ring of Fire – Tectonic belt of earthquakes and volcanoes
