= Mark A. Lever =

American ecologist (born 1977)

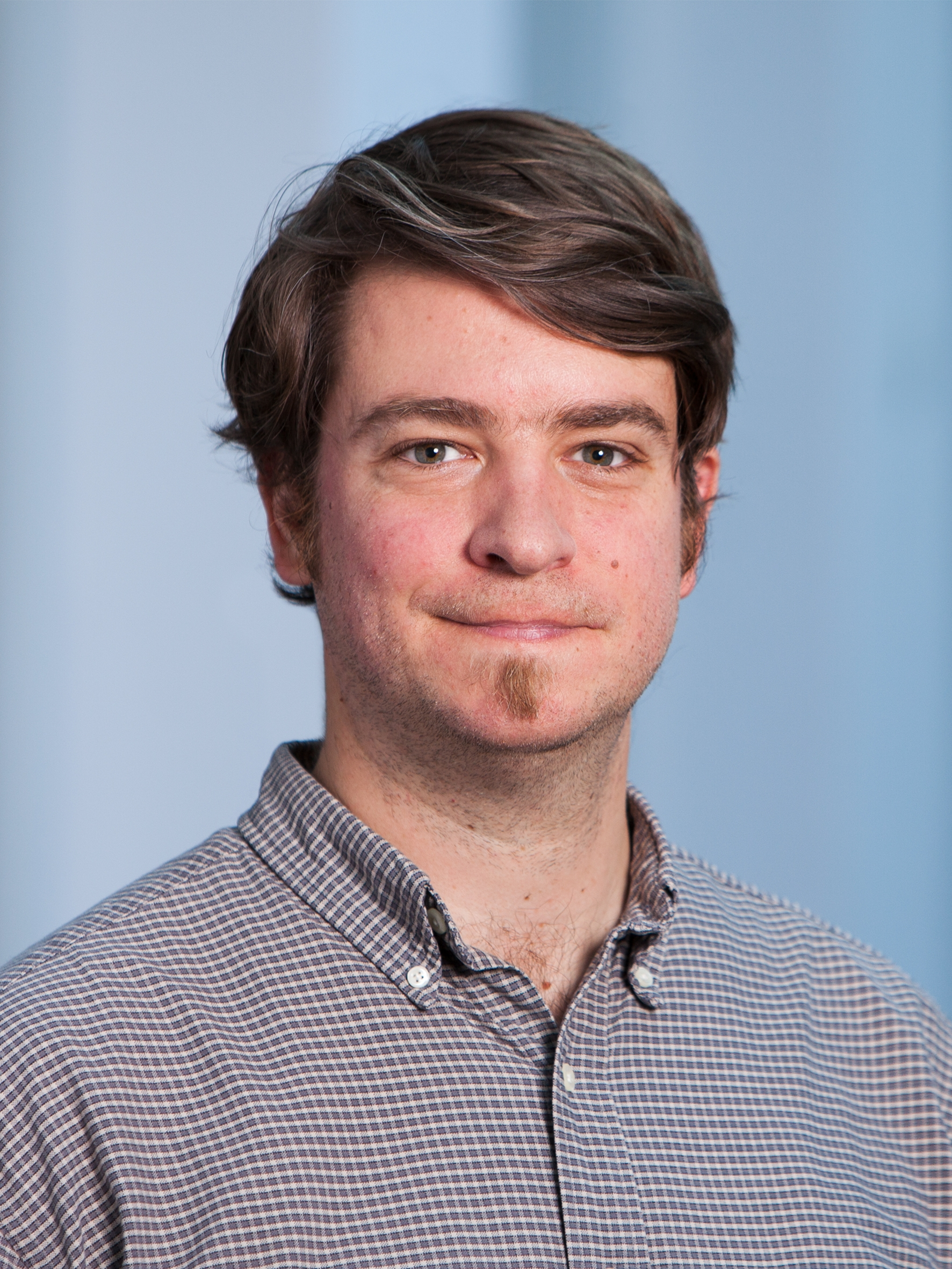
Mark A. Lever (2014)

Mark Alexander Lever is a microbial ecologist and biogeochemist who studies the role of microorganisms in the global carbon cycle. He is a professor of biogeochemistry and geobiology at the Marine Science Institute of the University of Texas at Austin.

== Biography ==
Mark A. Lever earned his MA in Marine Biology at the Boston University Marine Program at Woods Hole in 2002 and his PhD in Marine Sciences at the University of North Carolina, Chapel Hill in 2008. He worked as a postdoctoral scientist at Aarhus University from 2009 to 2014, and was a faculty member at ETH Zurich from 2014 to 2022, before joining the University of Texas at Austin. Lever was a member of the Deep Life Scientific Steering Committee and Synthesis Group 2019 for the Deep Carbon Observatory, and vice-chair of the European Cooperation of Science and Technology network "COST", and is an associate editor for Frontiers in Microbiology.

In his research, Mark A. Lever investigates the factors that determine the production, fate, and storage of organic carbon in aquatic sediments and in the Earth's crust. In 2013 he discovered that microbes survive deep in the oceanic crust by living off of chemical energy released by water-rock reactions. In addition, his research group is investigating the impact of macrofaunal bioturbation on microbial community structure and the sedimentary carbon cycle, the ecological and physiological strategies of microbial life inhabiting long-term energy-limited environments, and the potential for sediments to serve as genetic archives of past environmental change.
