= Mick Waters (education) =

British educational theorist

Professor Michael Waters (born 1949, Northamptonshire) was the Director of Curriculum at the (British) Qualifications and Curriculum Authority (QCA), based in London, from 2005 to 2009. He was responsible for what British children are legally obliged to study at school via the National Curriculum.

== Early life ==
His father was a plasterer and his mother was a school cook. He attended Magdalen College School, Brackley, then a grammar school. At school he was particularly good at cricket and wanted to become a professional cricketer. His careers advisor at school persuaded him to choose teaching as a career. He attended Sheffield City College of Education (the City of Sheffield Training College on Collegiate Crescent, now part of Sheffield Hallam University) for his teacher's certificate.

== Career ==
=== Teaching ===
He began as a primary school teacher in Nottingham. He was headmaster at two schools at Barrow-in-Furness and Kendal, then worked in teacher training at Charlotte Mason College, later part of Lancaster University, then the Ambleside campus of St Martin's College, then part of University of Cumbria, who closed the teacher training courses in 2008.

=== LEAs ===
He worked at Birmingham LEA, then the (Labour-controlled) City of Manchester LEA at the end of 2002 where he was Chief Education Officer. Manchester LEA is in the bottom five for GCSE results in the country.

=== QCA ===
He moved to the QCA in May 2005, leaving in 2009.

His role at the QCA was to give children a meaningful foundation of education, specifically to provide them with knowledge that will give them help in later life, and not just generic academic knowledge for the sake of it. This obligatory curriculum would prepare them for the future.

In September 2010, he described the English, Welsh and Northern Irish exams system (GCSE) as “diseased and almost corrupt” in the book Reinventing Schools, Reforming Teaching.

== Personal life ==
He lives in Worcester in Worcestershire.
