= Aqueous geochemistry =

Study of elements in watersheds

Aqueous geochemistry studies the role of various elements in natural waters, including copper, sulfur, and mercury. Researchers in this field also study how elemental fluxes are exchanged through interactions between the atmosphere, the earth or soil (terrestrial interactions) and bodies of water (aquatic interactions).

Work in the field of aqueous geochemistry has also studied the prevalence of rare earth elements, nuclear waste products, and hydrocarbons.
