= Julie Huber =

American oceanographer

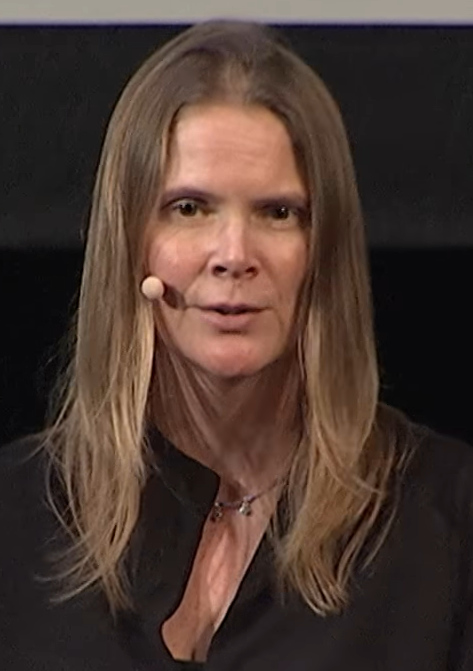
- Huber in 2019
- Education: Eckerd College, University of Washington
- Scientific career
- Fields: Oceanography
- Workplaces: Woods Hole Oceanographic Institution
- Doctoral advisor: John Baross
- Website: www2.whoi.edu/staff/jhuber/

Julie Huber is a Senior Scientist in the Marine Chemistry and Geochemistry department at Woods Hole Oceanographic Institution. She previously was an associate professor of ecology and evolutionary biology at Brown University, an associate scientist at the Marine Biological Laboratory in Woods Hole, Massachusetts, and the associate director of the MBL's Josephine Bay Paul Center for Comparative Molecular Biology and Evolution. She also serves as the associate director of the Center for Dark Energy Biosphere Investigations, a National Science Foundation-supported program headquartered at the University of Southern California.

== Early life and education ==
Huber spent her youth in Chicago and has cited frequent visits to the local Shedd Aquarium as part of her inspiration to pursue a career in oceanography. Huber was an undergraduate student at Eckerd College in St. Petersburg, Florida, and received her B.S. in marine science in 1998. She received her Ph.D. in biological oceanography from the University of Washington in 2004 for work with oceanographer and astrobiologist John Baross on the microbial ecology of underwater volcanoes.

== Academic career ==
Huber began work as a postdoctoral fellow at the Marine Biological Laboratory, a facility in Woods Hole, Massachusetts affiliated with the University of Chicago, in 2005; she became an assistant scientist there in 2007. She joined the faculty at Brown University as an assistant professor of ecology and evolutionary biology in 2008. She became an associate scientist at MBL and the associate director of the Josephine Bay Paul Center in 2013, and an associate professor at Brown in 2014. She moved her laboratory to Woods Hole Oceanographic Institution in June 2017.

Since 2015 Huber has served on the editorial board of the scientific journal Environmental Microbiology and as a senior editor of mSystems, an open-access journal published by the American Society for Microbiology. Huber is also active in public outreach and science communication.

In 2025 Huber was elected a Fellow of the American Academy of Microbiology.

== Research ==
Huber's research group studies the microbial ecology of the deep ocean, particularly the habitat formed beneath the sea floor and the contributions of microbes to marine biogeochemistry.
