= Deep Carbon Observatory =

Research program to study carbon's role deep beneath the Earth's surface

- Abbreviation: DCO
- Formation: 2009
- Purpose: Transforming our understanding of carbon in Earth's interior
- Members: 957 scientists from 47 countries (as of January 2017)
- Website: "deepcarbon.science".

The Deep Carbon Observatory (DCO) is a global research program designed to transform understanding of carbon's role in Earth. DCO is a community of scientists, including biologists, physicists, geoscientists and chemists, whose work crosses several traditional disciplinary lines to develop the new, integrative field of deep carbon science. To complement this research, the DCO's infrastructure includes public engagement and education, online and offline community support, innovative data management, and novel instrumentation development.

In December 2018, researchers announced that considerable amounts of life forms, including 70% of bacteria and archea on Earth, comprising up to 23 billion tonnes of carbon, live up to at least 4.8 km (3.0 mi) deep underground, including 2.5 km (1.6 mi) below the seabed, according to a ten-year Deep Carbon Observatory project.

== History ==
In 2007, Robert Hazen, a Senior Staff Scientist at the Carnegie Institution's Geophysical Laboratory (Washington, DC) spoke at the Century Club in New York, on the origins of life on Earth and how geophysical reactions may have played a critical role in the development of life on Earth. Jesse Ausubel, a faculty member at Rockefeller University and Program Director at the Alfred P. Sloan Foundation, was in attendance and later sought out Hazen's book, Genesis: The Scientific Quest for Life's Origins.

After two years of planning and collaboration, Hazen and colleagues officially launched the Deep Carbon Observatory (DCO) in August 2009, with its secretariat based at the Geophysical Laboratory of the Carnegie Institution of Washington, DC. Hazen and Ausubel, along with input from over 100 scientists invited to participate in the Deep Carbon Cycle Workshop in 2008, expanded their original idea. No longer focused solely on the origin of life on Earth, the group instead clarified their position to further human understanding of Earth, carbon, that critical element, had to take center stage.

== Deep carbon cycle ==
The Deep Carbon Observatory's research considers the global carbon cycle beyond Earth's surface. It explores high-pressure and extreme temperature organic synthesis, complex interactions between organic molecules and minerals, conducts field observations of deep microbial ecosystems and of anomalies in petroleum geochemistry, and constructs theoretical models of lower crust and upper mantle carbon sources and sinks.

== Research programs ==
The Deep Carbon Observatory is structured around four science communities focused on the topics of reservoirs and fluxes, deep life, deep energy, and extreme physics and chemistry.

=== Reservoirs and fluxes ===
The Reservoirs and Fluxes Community explores the storage and transport of carbon in Earth's deep interior. The subduction of tectonic plates and volcanic outgassing are primary vehicles for carbon fluxes to and from deep Earth, but the processes and rates of these fluxes, as well as their variation throughout Earth's history, remain poorly understood. In addition DCO research on primitive chondritic meteorites indicates that Earth is relatively depleted in highly volatile elements compared to chondrites, though DCO's research is further examining whether large reservoirs of carbon may be hidden in the mantle and core. Members of the Reservoirs and Fluxes Community are conducting research as a part of the Deep Earth Carbon Degassing Project to make tangible advances towards quantifying the amount of carbon outgassed from the Earth's deep interior (core, mantle, crust) into the surface environment (e.g. biosphere, hydrosphere, cryosphere, atmosphere) through naturally occurring processes.

=== Deep life ===
The Deep Life Community documents the extreme limits and global extent of subsurface life in our planet, exploring the evolutionary and functional diversity of Earth's deep biosphere and its interaction with the carbon cycle. The Deep Life Community maps the abundance and diversity of subsurface marine and continental microorganisms in time and space as a function of their genomic and biogeochemical properties, and their interactions with deep carbon.

By integrating in situ and in vitro assessments of biomolecules and cells, the Deep Life Community explores the environmental limits to the survival, metabolism and reproduction of deep life. The resulting data informs experiments and models that study the impact of deep life on the carbon cycle, and the deep biosphere's relation to the surface world. Members of the Deep Life Community are conducting research as a part of the Census of Deep Life, which seeks to identify the diversity and distribution of microbial life in continental and marine deep subsurface environments and to explore mechanisms that govern microbial evolution and dispersal in the deep biosphere.

In December 2018, researchers announced that considerable amounts of life forms, including 70% of bacteria and archea on Earth, comprising up to 23 billion tonnes of carbon, live up to at least 4.8 km (3.0 mi) deep underground, including 2.5 km (1.6 mi) below the seabed, according to a ten-year Deep Carbon Observatory project.

=== Deep energy ===
The Deep Energy Community is dedicated to quantifying the environmental conditions and processes from the molecular to the global scale that control the origins, forms, quantities and movements of reduced carbon compounds derived from deep carbon through deep geologic time. The Deep Energy Community uses field-based investigations of approximately 25 globally representative terrestrial and marine environments to determine processes controlling the origin, form, quantities and movements of abiotic gases and organic species in Earth's crust and uppermost mantle. Deep Energy also uses DCO-sponsored instrumentation, especially revolutionary isotopologue measurements, to discriminate between the abiotic and biotic methane gas and organic species sampled from global terrestrial and marine field sites. Another research activity of Deep Energy is to quantify the mechanisms and rates of fluid-rock interactions that produce abiotic hydrogen and organic compounds as a function of temperature, pressure, fluid and solid compositions.

=== Extreme physics and chemistry ===
As a result of a series of workshops, the DCO initiated an additional Science Community to examine the physics and chemistry of carbon under extreme conditions. The overarching goal of the Extreme Physics and Chemistry Community is to improve the understanding of the physical and chemical behavior of carbon at extreme conditions, as found in the deep interiors of Earth and other planets. Extreme Physics and chemistry research explores thermodynamics of carbon-bearing systems, chemical kinetics of chemical deep carbon processes, high-pressure biology and biophysics, physical properties of aqueous fluids, theoretical modeling for carbon and its compounds at high pressures and temperatures, and solid-fluid interactions under extreme conditions. The Extreme Physics and Chemistry Community also seeks to identify possible new carbon-bearing materials in Earth and planetary interiors, to characterize the properties of these materials and to identify reactions at conditions relevant to Earth and planetary interiors.

=== Integrating discovery ===
As the DCO nears its completion in 2020, it is integrating the discoveries made by its research communities into an overarching model of carbon in Earth, as well as other models and products aimed at both the scientific community and wider public.

== Research highlights ==
Research highlights to date include:

- ultra-deep diamonds, from > 670 km depth in the mantle, contain the geochemical signature of organic material from Earth's surface, highlighting the role of subduction in cycling carbon
- there may be significant amounts of iron carbide in Earth's core, accounting for perhaps two thirds of Earth's carbon budget
- next-generation mass spectrometry has allowed precise determination of methane isotopologues to identify abiogenic sources of methane from the crust and mantle
- the geosphere and biosphere show a complex linked evolution; with the diversity and ecology of carbon-bearing minerals on Earth closely mirroring major events in Earth history, such as the Great Oxidation Event
- the known limits to microbial life have been extended in terms of pressure and temperature; complex microbes are now known to thrive at depths of up to 2.5 km in the oceanic crust
- the volcanic flux of CO_{2} into the atmosphere is twice that previously thought (although this flux remains two orders of magnitude lower than anthropogenic fluxes of CO_{2})
- the discovery of pockets of ancient saline fluids in continental crust, isolated for > 2.6 Ga, rich in H_{2}, CH_{4} and ^{4}He, providing evidence for the existence of early crustal environments perhaps capable of harboring life
- the deep biosphere is among the largest ecosystems on Earth, encompassing 15,000 to 23,000 megatonnes (million metric tons) of carbon (about 250 to 400 times greater than the carbon mass of all humans on Earth's surface).

== Carbon in Earth ==
Carbon in Earth is Volume 75 of Reviews in Mineralogy and Geochemistry (RiMG). It was released as an open access publication on March 11, 2013. Each chapter of Carbon in Earth synthesizes what is known about deep carbon, and also outlines unanswered questions that will guide future DCO research. The Deep Carbon Observatory encourages open access publication, and is striving to become a leader in Earth sciences in this regard. DCO funding can be used to defray the costs of open access publication.

== Deep Carbon Observatory data science ==
Recent advances in data generation techniques lead to increasingly complex data. At the same time, science and engineering disciplines are rapidly becoming more and more data driven with the ultimate aim of better understanding and modeling the dynamics of complex systems. However complex data requires integration of information and knowledge across multiple scales and spanning traditional disciplinary boundaries. Significant advances in methods, tools and applications for data science and informatics over the last five years can now be applied to multi- and inter-disciplinary problem areas. Given these challenges, it is clear that each DCO Research Community faces diverse data science and data management needs to fulfill both their overarching objectives and their day-to-day tasks. The Deep Carbon Observatory Data Science Team handles the data science and data management needs for each DCO program and for the DCO as a whole, using a combination of informatics methods, use case development, requirements analysis, inventories and interviews.

== Scientists ==
A list of some of the scientists involved in the Deep Carbon Observatory:

- Peter Clift, Louisiana State University
- Frederick Colwell, Oregon State University
- Isabelle Daniel, Claude Bernard University Lyon 1
- Steven D'Hondt, University of Rhode Island
- Marie Edmonds, University of Cambridge
- Peter Fox, Rensselaer Polytechnic Institute
- Mark S. Ghiorso, OFM Research
- Robert Hazen, Carnegie Institution for Science
- Russell J. Hemley, George Washington University
- Kai-Uwe Hinrichs, University of Bremen
- Julie Huber, Marine Biological Laboratory and Brown University
- Fumio Inagaki, Japan Agency for Marine-Earth Science and Technology (JAMSTEC)
- Louise H. Kellogg, University of California, Davis
- Mark A. Lever, ETH Zurich
- Jie Jackie Lie, University of Michigan
- Tullis Onstott, Princeton University
- Barbara Sherwood Lollar, University of Toronto
- Xiaogang Ma, Rensselaer Polytechnic Institute and University of Idaho
- Craig E. Manning, University of California, Los Angeles
- Beth Orcutt, Bigelow Laboratory for Ocean Sciences
- Terry Plank, Columbia College, Columbia University
- Mitchell Sogin, Marine Biological Laboratory
- Dimitri Sverjensky, Johns Hopkins University
- Emilie Thomassot, Université de Lorraine
- Roland Winter, Technical University of Dortmund
- Fengping Wang, Shanghai Jiao Tong University
- Michael J. Walter, Carnegie Institution of Washington
- Jung-Fu Lin, The University of Texas at Austin
- Wendy Mao, Stanford University

== Media ==
On 11 April 2020, the Australian Broadcasting Corporation's Science Show broadcast a 37 minute radio documentary on the DCO.

== See also ==
- Carbonaceous chondrite
- Carbon Mineral Challenge
- Deep Earth Carbon Degassing Project
- German Continental Deep Drilling Programme
- Japan Oil, Gas and Metals National Corporation
- Integrated Ocean Drilling Program
- Kola Superdeep Borehole
- Orbiting Carbon Observatory
- Project Mohole
- Serpentinite
- Terrestrial biological carbon cycle
