= Spin state =

Spin state may refer to:

- Spin quantum number, a quantum number
- Spin states (d electrons), the potentials for high-spin and low-spin configurations of d electrons in transition metal complexes
- Spin State, a 2003 novel by Chris Moriarty
