= Craig E. Manning =

Professor of geology and geochemistry

Craig E. Manning is a professor of geology and geochemistry in the Department of Earth, Planetary, and Space Sciences at the University of California, Los Angeles, where he served as department chair between 2008 and 2012. Manning's research interests include water chemistry, thermodynamics, gas chemistry, geochemistry, igneous petrology, and metamorphic petrology.

== Career ==
Manning received his B.A. in geology from the University of Vermont in 1982. He then received his M.S. in geology in 1985 and his Ph.D. in geology in 1989, from Stanford University. Manning served as a postdoctoral research scientist for the United States Geological Survey in Menlo Park, CA. Manning then taught at UCLA for over a decade: first as an assistant professor, then as an associate professor. In 2000, he was named a visiting professor at the Swiss Federal Institute of Technology. Since 2002, Manning has been a professor of geology. Between 2009 and 2012, he served as chair of the Department of Earth, Planetary, and Space Sciences at UCLA. Manning is a visiting researcher at the Institut de Physique du Globe de Paris, France. He also is an active member of the Deep Carbon Observatory (DCO), where he chairs the Executive Committee, its Extreme Physics, and Chemistry community, and is a member of both DCO's Reservoirs and Fluxes community and Synthesis Group 2019.

== Research initiatives ==
Manning's current projects include high-pressure experiments investigating how minerals dissolve in water in the lower crust and upper mantle, studies of metamorphism of oceanic gabbros from the East Pacific Rise to understand the timing and temperatures of fluid-rock interactions in the lower crust of mid-ocean ridges, and finally investigations into the links between fluid flow, mineral reaction, and permeability in the Spanish Peaks fossil hydrothermal system of south-central Colorado.

== Honors and awards ==
Manning is a Fellow of the American Geophysical Union, the Geochemical Society, and the Mineralogical Society of America. He is a Humboldt Research Award winner and a Helmholtz International Fellow. He has served as a Distinguished Lecturer for GeoPrisms and the Mineralogical Society of America. Manning also is a recipient of the Norman L. Bowen award. He was elected to the U.S. National Academy of Sciences in 2026.

== Selected publications ==
Manning has published over 160 papers for a total of over 20,000 citations and an h-index of 78. These include:

- Manning, Craig E. (November 1994). "The solubility of quartz in H2O in the lower crust and upper mantle". Geochimica et Cosmochimica Acta. 58 (22): 4831–4839. doi:10.1016/0016-7037(94)90214-3.
- Manning, C. E.; Ingebritsen, S. E. (February 1999). "Permeability of the continental crust: Implications of geothermal data and metamorphic systems". Reviews of Geophysics. 37 (1): 127–150. Bibcode:1999RvGeo..37..127M. doi:10.1029/1998RG900002.
- Manning, C. E. (June 2004). "The chemistry of subduction-zone fluids". Earth and Planetary Science Letters. 223 (1–2): 1–16. Bibcode:2004E&PSL.223....1M. doi:10.1016/j.epsl.2004.04.030.
