= Michael J. Walter =

American experimental petrologist

- Education: University of Nebraska–Lincoln; University of Texas, Dallas
- Known for: Diamond inclusions, early Earth history, planetary accretion
- Awards: 2019, Fellow, American Geophysical Union; 2016, Fellow, Mineralogical Society of America
- Scientific career
- Fields: Petrology, geochemistry, mineralogy, geophysics
- Workplaces: Institute for Study of the Earth's Interior, Misasa, Japan; School of Earth Sciences, University of Bristol; Earth and Planetary Laboratory, Washington DC, US

Michael J. Walter is an American experimental petrologist at Earth and Planetary Laboratory (EPL, formally Geophysical Lab and Department of Terrestrial Magnetism) of the Carnegie Institution of Washington. He is also the director of EPL. He was on editorial board of JGR: Solid Earth from 2012 to 2018. Michael studies how rocks behave when transported to deep Earth interiors and associated elemental behaviors. He also uses super-deep diamonds to study the how Earth's mantle works.

== Research ==
Walter uses experimental petrology to research on early Earth's history, when the planet just formed from accretion of the cloud of gas and dust surrounding our young Sun, and when distinct layers of Earth's mantle and core start to take shape. He also investigates physical properties of deep materials in Earth's interior, focusing on extracting information about mantle conditions from tiny compositional variations preserved inside diamonds.
