= Deep biosphere =

Life in the deep subsurface of the Earth

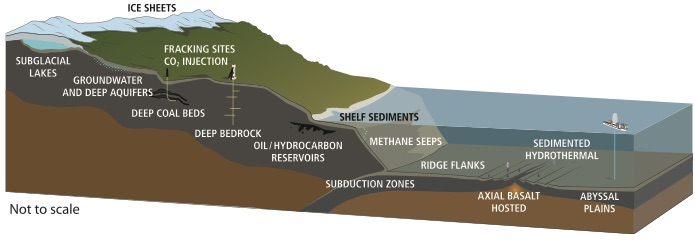
Environments in which subsurface life has been found

The deep biosphere is the part of the biosphere that resides below the first few meters of the land surface and seafloor. It extends 10 km (6.2 mi) below the continental surface and 21 km (13 mi) below the sea surface, at temperatures that may reach beyond 120 °C (248 °F) which is comparable to the maximum temperature where a metabolically active organism has been found. It includes all three domains of life and the genetic diversity rivals that on the surface.

The first indications of deep life came from studies of oil fields in the 1920s, but it was not certain that the organisms were indigenous until methods were developed in the 1980s to prevent contamination from the surface. Samples are now collected in deep mines and scientific drilling programs in the ocean and on land. Deep observatories have been established for more extended studies.

Near the surface, living organisms primarily consume organic matter and breathe oxygen (heterotrophs) or photosynthesize energy from sunlight (autotrophs). Lower down, these resources are not available, so organisms make use of "edibles" (electron donors) such as hydrogen (released from rocks by various chemical processes), methane (CH_{4}), reduced sulfur compounds, and ammonium (NH_{4}). They "breathe" electron acceptors such as nitrates and nitrites, manganese and iron oxides, oxidized sulfur compounds and carbon dioxide (CO_{2}). There is very little energy at greater depths, so metabolisms are up to a million times slower than at the surface. Cells may live for thousands of years before dividing and there is no known limit to their age.

The subsurface accounts for about 90% of the biomass across two domains of life, Archaea and Bacteria, and approximately 15% of the Earth's total biosphere. Estimates of the exact mass vary significantly depending on the samples and measurement methods used, but the "15 to 23 billion tons (Note: The biomass is usually expressed in tons of the element carbon.)" figure is cited very often. Eukarya are also found, including some multicellular life - fungi and animals (nematodes, flatworms, rotifers, annelids, and arthropods). Viruses are also present and infect the microbes.

== Definition ==
The deep biosphere is an ecosystem of organisms and their living space in the deep subsurface. For the seafloor, an operational definition of deep subsurface is the region that is not bioturbated by animals; this is generally about a meter or more below the surface. On continents, it is below a few meters, not including soils. The organisms in this zone are sometimes referred to as intraterrestrials. A subset of the deep biosphere found at depths where pressure and heat greatly exceed that survivable by surface life was delineated and named by Thomas Gold in a 1992 paper titled, "The Deep, Hot Biosphere."

== Early discoveries and ideas ==
At the University of Chicago in the 1920s, geologist Edson Bastin enlisted the help of microbiologist Frank Greer in an effort to explain why water extracted from oil fields contained hydrogen sulfide and bicarbonates. These chemicals are normally created by bacteria, but the water came from a depth where the heat and pressure were considered too great to support life. They were able to culture anaerobic sulfate-reducing bacteria from the water, demonstrating that the chemicals had a bacterial origin.

Also in the 1920s, Charles Lipman, a microbiologist at the University of California, Berkeley, noticed that bacteria that had been sealed in bottles for 40 years could be reanimated – a phenomenon now known as anhydrobiosis. He wondered whether the same was true of bacteria in coal seams. He sterilized samples of coal, wetted them, crushed them and then succeeded in culturing bacteria from the coal dust. One sterilization procedure, baking the coal at 160 °C (320 °F) for up to 50 hours, actually encouraged their growth. He published the results in 1931.

The first studies of subsurface life were conducted by Claude E. Zobell, the "father of marine microbiology", in the late 1930s to the 1950s. Although the coring depth was limited, microbes were found wherever the sediments were sampled. With increasing depth, aerobes gave way to anaerobes.

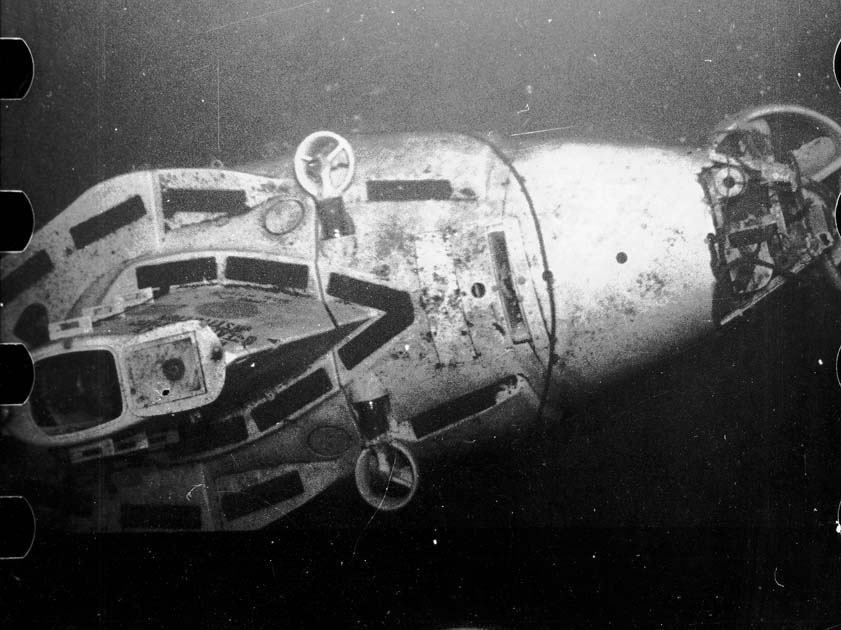
Photograph of the sunken Alvin taken in 1969

Most biologists dismissed the subsurface microbes as contamination, especially after the submersible Alvin sank in 1968 and the scientists escaped, leaving their lunches behind. When Alvin was recovered, the lunches showed no sign of microbial decay. This reinforced a view of the deep sea (and by extension the subsurface) as a lifeless desert. The study of the deep biosphere, like many bacteria, was dormant for decades; an exception is a group of Soviet microbiologists who began to refer to themselves as geomicrobiologists.

Interest in subsurface life was renewed when the United States Department of Energy was looking for a safe way of burying nuclear waste, and Frank J. Wobber realized that microbes below the surface could either help by degrading the buried waste or hinder by breaching the sealed containers. He formed the Subsurface Science Program to study deep life. To address the problem of contamination, special equipment was designed to minimize contact between a core sample and the drilling fluid that lubricates the drill bit. In addition, tracers were added to the fluid to indicate whether it penetrated the core. In 1987, several boreholes were drilled near the Savannah River Site, and microorganisms were found to be plentiful and diverse at least 500 metres below the surface.

From 1983 until now, microbiologists have analyzed cell abundances in drill cores from the International Ocean Discovery Program (originally the Ocean Drilling Program). A group led by John Parkes of the University of Bristol reported concentrations of 10^{4} to 10^{8} cells per gram of sediment down to depths of 500 metres (agricultural soils contain about 10^{9} cells per gram). This was initially met with skepticism, and it took them four years to publish their results.

In 1992, Thomas Gold published a paper titled "The Deep, Hot Biosphere" suggesting that microbial life was widespread throughout the subsurface, existing in pore spaces between grains of rocks. He also published a book similarly titled The Deep Hot Biosphere. According to one paper, he "pioneered" the idea that hydrocarbons could sustain life to "known depths of 10km and possibly down to 300km", if the temperature was not over a hypothetical maximum of 150 °C. Gold also suggested that the deep biosphere is sustained by hydrocarbons geologically produced by the subsurface, or their derivatives. According to the paper, Gold's proposals helped to inspire later generations of scientists.

In 1998, William Whitman and colleagues published a summary of twelve years of data in the Proceedings of the National Academy of Sciences. They estimated that up to 95% of all prokaryotes (archaea and bacteria) live in the deep subsurface, with 55% in the marine subsurface and 39% in the terrestrial subsurface. In 2002, Ocean Drilling Program Leg 201 was the first to be motivated by a search for deep life. Most of the previous exploration was on continental margins, so the goal was to drill in the open ocean for comparison. In 2016, International Ocean Discovery Program Leg 370 drilled into the marine sediment of the Nankai Accretionary Prism and observed 10^{2} vegetative cells per cm^{3} at 118 °C.

== Scientific methods ==
The present understanding of subsurface biology was made possible by numerous advances in technology for sample collection, field analysis, molecular science, cultivation, imaging and computation.

=== Sample collection ===
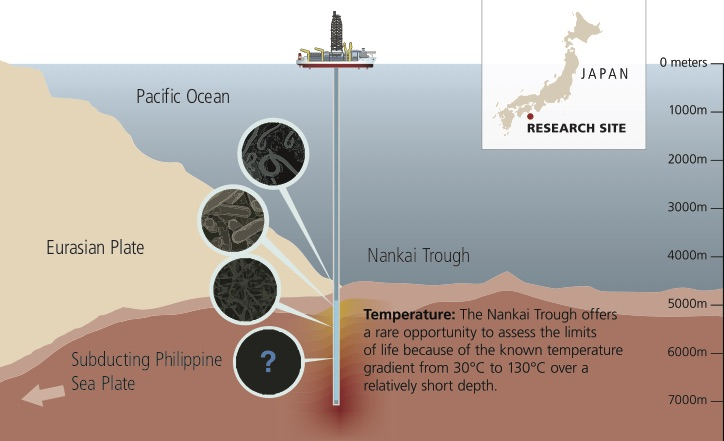
Schematic of an expedition aboard the Japanese drilling ship D/V Chikyū

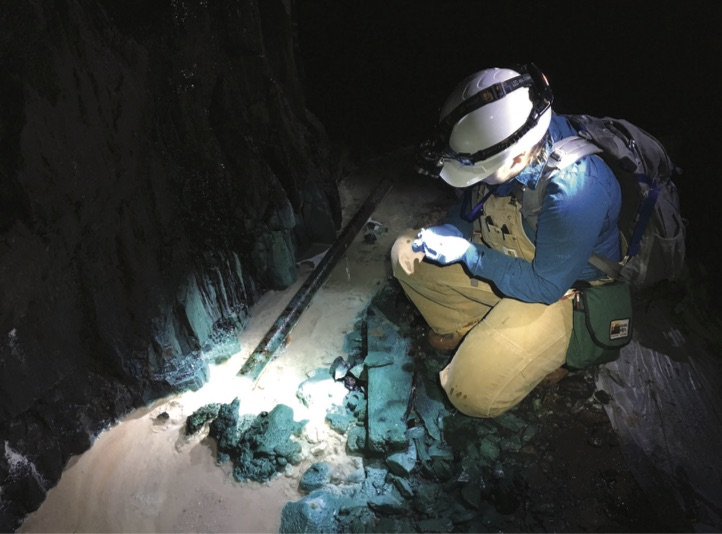
Researcher sampling fluid from a deep mine

Microbes from the ocean floor can be sampled by drilling boreholes and collecting cores. The methods must be adapted to different types of rock, and the cost of drilling limits the number of holes that can be drilled. Microbiologists have made use of scientific drilling programs: the Ocean Drilling Program (ODP), which used the JOIDES Resolution drilling platform, and the Integrated Ocean Drilling Program (IODP), which used the Japanese ship Chikyū.

Deep underground mines, for example South African gold mines and the Pyhäsalmi copper and zinc mine in Finland, have also provided opportunities to sample the deep biosphere, as have chosen or proposed nuclear waste repository sites (e.g., Yucca Mountain and the Waste Isolation Pilot Plant in the United States, Äspö and surrounding areas in Sweden, Onkalo and surrounding areas in Finland, and Mont Terri in Switzerland). Scientific drilling of the continental deep subsurface has been promoted by the International Continental Scientific Drilling Program (ICDP).

To allow continuous underground sampling, various kinds of observatories have been developed. On the ocean floor, the Circulation Obviation Retrofit Kit (CORK) seals a borehole to cut off the influx of seawater. An advanced version of CORK is able to seal off multiple sections of a drill hole using "packers", rubber tubes that inflate to seal the space between the drill string and the wall of the borehole.

In sediments, the Simple Cabled Instrument for Measuring Parameters In-Situ (SCIMPI) is designed to remain and take measurements after a borehole has collapsed. Packers are also used in the continental subsurface, along with devices such as the flow-through in situ reactor (FTISR). Various methods are used to extract fluids from these sites, including passive and osmotic gas samplers and U-tube systems. In narrow (less than 50 mm) holes, polyamide tubes with a back-pressure valve can be lowered to sample an entire column of fluid.

=== Field analysis and manipulation ===
Some methods analyze microbes in situ rather than extracting them from the subsurface. In biogeophysics, the effects of microbes on properties of geological materials are remotely probed using electrical signals. Microbes can be tagged using a stable isotope, such as carbon-13, and then re-injected in the ground to see where they go. A "push-pull" method involves injection of a fluid into an aquifer and extraction of a mixture of injected fluid with the ground water; the latter can then be analyzed to determine what chemical reactions occurred.

=== Molecular methods and cultivation ===
Methods from modern molecular biology allow the extraction of nucleic acids, lipids and proteins from cells, DNA sequencing, and the physical and chemical analysis of molecules using mass spectrometry and flow cytometry. Even when individual microbes cannot be cultivated, a lot can be learned about microbial communities using these methods. For example, at the Richmond Mine in California, scientists used shotgun sequencing to identify four new species of bacteria, three new species of archaea (known as the Archaeal Richmond Mine acidophilic nanoorganisms), and 572 proteins unique to the bacteria.

=== Geochemical methods ===
Deep microorganisms change the chemistry of their surroundings through the nutrients they consume and the wastes they produce from metabolic activity. Therefore scientists can estimate the activities of the deep microorganisms by measuring the chemical compositions of subsurface samples. Complementary techniques include measuring the isotope compositions of the chemicals or the related minerals.

== Conditions for life ==
For life to have metabolic activity, it must be able to take advantage of a thermodynamic disequilibrium in the environment. This can occur when rocks from the mantle that are rich in the mineral olivine are exposed to seawater and react with it to form serpentine minerals and magnetite. Non-equilibrium conditions are also associated with hydrothermal vents, volcanism, and geothermal activity. Other processes that might provide habitats for life include roll front development in ore bodies, (Note: A roll front is a curved ore zone that precipitates out of a solution carrying dissolved ore.) subduction, methane clathrate formation and decomposition, permafrost thawing, infrared radiation and seismic activity. Humans also create new habitats for life, particularly through remediation of contaminants in the subsurface.

=== Energy sources ===
Life requires enough energy to construct adenosine triphosphate (ATP). Where there is sunlight, the main processes for capturing energy are photosynthesis (which harnesses the energy in sunlight by converting carbon dioxide into organic molecules) and respiration (which consumes those molecules and releases carbon dioxide). Below the surface, the main source of energy is from chemical redox (reduction-oxidation) reactions. This requires electron donors (compounds that can be oxidized) and electron acceptors (compounds that can be reduced). An example of such a reaction is methane oxidation:

CH_{4} + 2 O_{2} → CO_{2} + 2 H_{2}O

Here CH_{4} is the donor and O_{2} is the acceptor. Donors can be considered "edibles" and acceptors "breathables".

The amount of energy that is released in a metabolic reaction depends on the redox potential of the chemicals involved. Electron donors have negative potentials. From highest to lowest redox potential, some common donors available in the subsurface are organic matter, hydrogen, methane, reduced sulfur compounds, reduced iron compounds and ammonium. From most negative to least, some acceptors are oxygen, nitrates and nitrites, manganese and iron oxides, oxidized sulfur compounds, and carbon dioxide.

Of electron donors, organic matter has the most negative redox potential. It can consist of deposits from regions where sunlight is available or produced by local organisms. Fresh material is more easily utilized than aged. Terrestrial organic matter (mainly from plants) is typically harder to process than marine (phytoplankton). Some organisms break down organic compounds using fermentation and hydrolysis, making it possible for others to convert it back to carbon dioxide. Hydrogen is a good energy source, but competition tends to make it scarce. It is particularly rich in hydrothermal fluids where it is produced by serpentinization. Multiple species can combine fermentation with methanogenesis and iron oxidation with hydrogen consumption. Methane is mostly found in marine sediments, in gaseous form (dissolved or free) or in methane hydrates. About 20% comes from abiotic sources (breakdown of organic matter or serpentinization) and 80% from biotic sources (which reduce organic compounds such as carbon dioxide, carbon monoxide and acetate). Over 90% of methane is oxidized by microbes before it reaches the surface; this activity is "one of the most important controls on greenhouse gas emissions and climate on Earth." Reduced sulfur compounds such as elemental sulfur, hydrogen sulfide (H_{2}S) and pyrite (FeS_{2}) are found in hydrothermal vents in basaltic crust, where they precipitate out when metal-rich fluids contact seawater. Reduced iron compounds in sediments are mainly deposited or produced by anaerobic reduction of iron oxides.

The electron acceptor with the highest redox potential is oxygen. Produced by photosynthesis, it is transported to the ocean floor. There, it is quickly taken up if there is a lot of organic material, and may only be present in the top few centimeters. In organic-poor sediments it can be found at greater depths, even to the oceanic crust. Nitrate can be produced by degradation of organic matter or nitrogen fixation. Oxygen and nitrate are derived from photosynthesis, so underground communities that utilize them are not truly independent of the surface.

=== Nutrients ===
All life requires carbon, oxygen, nitrogen, phosphorus and some trace elements such as nickel, molybdenum and vanadium. Over 99.9% of Earth's carbon is stored in the crust and its overlying sediments, but the availability of this carbon can depend on the oxidation state of the environment. Organic carbon, nitrogen and phosphorus are primarily found in terrestrial sediments, which accumulate mainly in continental margins. Organic carbon is mainly produced at the surface of the oceans with photosynthesis or washed into oceans with terrestrial sediments. Only a small fraction is produced in the deep seas with chemosynthesis. When organic carbon sinks from the surface of the ocean to the seafloor, most of the organic carbon is consumed by organisms in seawater. Only a small fraction of this sinking organic carbon can reach the seafloor and be available to the deep biosphere. Deeper in the marine sediments, the organic content drops further. Phosphorus is taken up by iron oxyhydroxides when basalts and sulfide rocks are weathered, limiting its availability. The availability of nutrients are limiting the deep biosphere, determining where and what type of deep organisms can thrive.

=== Pressure ===
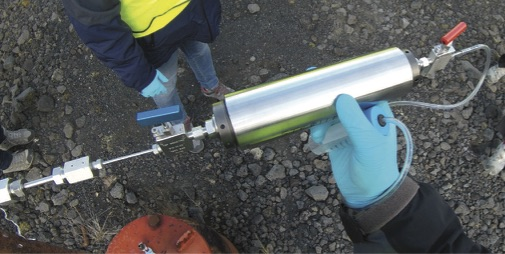
The PUSH50 device keeps deep-sea samples at high pressure.

On average, atmospheric pressure at sea level is about 101 kilopascals (kPa). In the ocean, the pressure increases at a rate of 10.5 kPa per m of depth, so at a typical depth of the sea floor (3800 m) the pressure is 38 megapascals (MPa) – 380 atmospheres. At these depths, the boiling point of water is over 400 °C. At the bottom of the Mariana Trench, the pressure is 110 MPa. In the lithosphere, the pressure increases by 22.6 kPa/m. The deep biosphere withstands pressures much higher than the pressure at the surface of the Earth.

An increased pressure compresses lipids, making membranes less fluid. In most chemical reactions, the products occupy more volume than the reactants, so the reactions are inhibited by pressure. Nevertheless, some studies claim that cells from the surface are still active at a pressure of 1 gigapascal (GPa), about 10,000 times the standard atmospheric pressure. There are also piezophiles for which optimal growth occurs at pressures over 100 MPa, and some do not grow in pressures less than 50 MPa.

As of 2019, most sampling of organisms from the deep ocean and subsurface undergo decompression when they are removed to the surface. This can harm the cells in a variety of ways, and experiments at surface pressures produce an inaccurate picture of microbial activity in the deep biosphere. A Pressurized Underwater Sampler Handler (PUSH50) has been developed to maintain in situ pressure during sampling and afterwards in the laboratory.

=== Temperature ===
High temperatures stress organisms, increasing the rates of processes that damage important molecules such as DNA and amino acids. It also increases the energy requirements for repairing these molecules. However, cells can respond by changing the structure of these molecules to stabilize them.

Microbes can survive at temperatures above 100 °C if the pressure is high enough to keep the water from boiling. The highest temperature at which an organism has been cultured in a laboratory is 122 °C, under pressures of 20 MPa and 40 MPa. Theoretical estimates for the highest temperature that can sustain life are around 150 °C. The 120 °C isotherm can be less than 10 m deep at mid-ocean ridges and seamounts, but in other environments such as deep-sea trenches it can be kilometers deep. About 39% by volume of ocean sediments are at temperatures between 40 °C and 120 °C. Thermochronology data of Precambrian cratons suggest that habitable temperature conditions of the subsurface in these settings range back to about a billion years maximum.

The record-setting thermophile, Methanopyrus kandlerii, was isolated from a hydrothermal vent, which provide abundant energy and nutrients. Several groups of Archaea and Bacteria thrive in the shallow seafloor at temperatures between 80 °C and 105 °C. As the environment becomes more energy-limited, such as being deeper, bacteria can survive but their number decreases. Although microorganisms have been detected at temperatures up to 118 °C in cored sediments, attempts to isolate the organisms have failed. There can also be depth intervals with less cells than the deeper part of the location. Reasons for such 'low- or no-cell intervals' are still unknown but may be related to the underground flow of hot fluid. In deep oil reservoirs, no microbial activity has been seen hotter than 80 °C.

=== Living with energy limitation ===
In most of the subsurface, organisms live in conditions of extreme energy and nutrient limitation. This is far from the conditions in which cells are cultured in labs. A lab culture goes through a series of predictable phases. After a short lag phase, there is a period of exponential growth in which the population can double in as little as 20 minutes. A death phase follows in which almost all the cells die off. The remainder enter an extended stationary phase in which they can last for years without further input of substrate. However, each live cell has 100 to 1000 dead cells to feed on, so they still have abundant nutrients compared to the subsurface.

In the subsurface, cells catabolize (break down molecules for energy or building materials) 10,000 to one million times slower than at the surface. Biomass may take centuries or millennia to turn over. There is no known limit to the age that cells could reach. The viruses that are present could kill cells and there may be grazing by eukaryotes, but there is no evidence of that.

It is difficult to establish clear limits on the energy needed to keep cells alive but not growing. They need energy to perform certain basic functions like the maintenance of osmotic pressure and maintenance of macromolecules such as enzymes and RNA (e.g., proofreading and synthesis). However, laboratory estimates of the energy needed are several orders of magnitude greater than the energy supply that appears to sustain life underground.

It was thought, at first, that most underground cells are dormant. However, some extra energy is required to come out of dormancy. This is not a good strategy in an environment where the energy sources are stable over millions of years but decreasing slowly. The available evidence suggests that most cells in the subsurface are active and viable.

A low-energy environment favors cells with minimal self-regulation, because there are no changes in the environment that they need to respond to. There could be low-energy specialists. However, there is unlikely to be strong evolutionary pressure for such organisms to evolve because of the low turnover and because the environment is a dead end.

While the age of microbes in the subseafloor are still relatively unknown, there has been tremendous progress in the past few years to uncover this. For decades it was thought that life below the seafloor was dormant, at best. From core samples taken in 2010 and analyzed later in 2020, it was found that oxygen was found in cores from 100m below the ocean floor. When brought to a laboratory setting, it was found that these microbes were capable of growing and dividing after being dormant for potentially hundreds of thousands of years. The samples taken showed that 99.1% of the samples, all being from sediment deposited 101.5 million years ago, were alive and ready to eat. Samples in this study were taken on expedition 329 of “South Pacific Gyre Subseafloor Life,” of the Integrated Ocean Drilling Program.

Deep subseafloor microbial communities have very low turnover times because nutrient cycling is slow. Despite the slow rate of nutrient cycling, these communities can still contribute to the global biogeochemical cycle. With the very low metabolic rate, many cells may be dormant or working under energy-poor conditions. Commonly these cells are maintaining or repairing themselves, rather than reproducing. The age of subseafloor microbes was observed from samples taken part of the Ocean Drilling Program. While they are not completely dormant, microbes in the subseafloor sediment persist at extraordinarily slow rates of metabolic energy, estimated to be 3-6 orders of magnitude slower than in marine sediments and microbial cultures. The turnover time of microbial biomass in the subseafloor sediment is upwards of hundreds of thousands of years. This is much slower than per-cell activity of surface microbes. These microbes rely on buried organic matter that originated as seafloor sediment.

== Diversity ==
The biomass in the deep subsurface is about 15% of the total for the biosphere. Life from all three domains (Archaea, Bacteria, and Eukarya) have been found in the deep subsurface; indeed, the deep subsurface accounts for about 90% of all the biomass in Archaea and Bacteria. The genetic diversity is at least as great as that on the surface. Aerobic microbes are also present; methane-feeding bacteria will break down nitrites into nitrogen and oxygen, and then use the oxygen to split methane for energy. Some of the oxygen produced this way will leak out of the cells and into the surrounding environment, where it will benefit other oxygen-dependent microorganisms.

In the ocean, plankton species are distributed globally and are constantly being deposited almost everywhere. Quite different communities are found even in the top of ocean floor, and species diversity decreases with depth. However, there are still some taxa that are widespread in the subsurface. In marine sediments, the main bacterial phyla are "Candidatus Atribacteria" (formerly OP9 and JS1), Pseudomonadota, Chloroflexota, and Planctomycetota. Members of Archaea were first identified using metagenomic analysis, but some of them have since been cultured and acquired new names. The Deep Sea Archaeal Group (DSAG) became the Marine Benthic Group B (MBG-B) and is now a proposed phylum "Lokiarchaeota". Along with the former Ancient Archaeal Group (AAG) and Marine Hydrothermal Vent Group (MHVG), "Lokiarchaeota" is part of a candidate superphylum, Asgard. Other phyla are "Bathyarchaeota" (formerly the Miscellaneous Chrenarchaeotal Group), Nitrososphaerota (formerly Thaumarchaeota or Marine Group I), and Euryarchaeota (including "Hadesarchaea", Archaeoglobales and Thermococcales). A related clade, anaerobic methanotrophic archaea (ANME), is also represented. Other bacterial phyla include Thermotogota.

In the continental subsurface, the main bacterial groups are Pseudomonadota and Bacillota while the Archaea are mainly Methanomicrobia and Nitrososphaerota. Other phyla include "Bathyarchaeota" and "Aigarchaeota", while bacterial phyla include Aquificota and Nitrospirota.

The eukarya in the deep biosphere include some multicellular life. In 2009 a species of nematode, Halicephalobus mephisto, was discovered in rock fissures more than a kilometer down a South African gold mine. Nicknamed the "devil worm", it may have been forced down along with pore water by earthquakes. Other multicellular organisms have since been found, including fungi, Platyhelminthes (flatworms), Rotifera, Annelida (ringed worms) and Arthropoda. However, their range may be limited because sterols, needed to construct membranes in eukarya, are not easily made in anaerobic conditions.

Viruses are also present in large numbers and infect a diverse range of microbes in the deep biosphere. They may contribute significantly to cell turnover and transfer of genetic information between cells.

== Habitats ==
Life has been found at depths of 5 km in continents and 10.5 km below the ocean surface. In 1992, Thomas Gold calculated that if the estimated pore space of the terrestrial land mass down to 5 km depth was filled with water, and if 1% of this volume were microbial biomass, it would be enough living matter to cover Earth's land surface with a 1.5 m thick layer. Such biomass would be enormous, 2×10^{14} or 200,000 billion tons (for comparison, the dominating biomass, i.e. plants, numbers in the hundreds of billions tons). The estimated volume of the deep biosphere is 2–2.3 billion cubic kilometers, about twice the volume of the oceans.

=== Ocean floor ===
The main types of habitat below the seafloor are sediments and igneous rock. The latter may be partially altered and coexist with its alteration products such as sulfides and carbonates. In rock, chemicals are mainly carried through an aquifer system that cycles all of the ocean's water every 200,000 years. In sediments below the top few centimeters, chemicals mainly spread by the much slower process of diffusion.

==== Sediments ====
Nearly all of the seafloor is covered by marine sediments. They can vary in thickness from centimeters near ocean ridges to over 10 kilometers in deep trenches. In the mid-ocean, coccoliths and shells settling down from the surface form oozes, while near shore sediment is carried from the continents by rivers. Minerals from hydrothermal vents and wind-blown particles also contribute. As organic matter is deposited and buried, the more easily utilized compounds are depleted by microbial oxidation, leaving the more recalcitrant compounds. Thus, the energy available for life declines. In the top few meters, metabolic rates decline by 2 to 3 orders of magnitude, and throughout the sediment column cell numbers decline with depth.

Sediments form layers with different conditions for life. In the top 5–10 centimeters, animals burrow, reworking the sediment and extending the sediment-water interface. The water carries oxygen, fresh organic matter and dissolved metabolites, resulting in a heterogenous environment with abundant nutrients. Below the burrowed layer is a layer dominated by sulfate reduction. Below that, the anaerobic reduction of methane is facilitated by sulfate in the sulfate-methane transition zone (SMTZ). Once the sulfates are depleted, methane formation takes over. The depth of the chemical zones depends on the rate that organic matter is deposited. Where it is rapid, oxygen is taken up rapidly as organic matter is consumed; where slow, oxygen can persist much deeper because of the lack of nutrients to oxidize.

Ocean sediment habitats can be divided into subduction zones, abyssal plains, and passive margins. At a subduction zone, where one plate is diving under another, a thick wedge of sediment tends to form. At first the sediment has 50 to 60 percent porosity; as it is compressed, fluids are expelled to form cold seeps or gas hydrates.

Abyssal plains are the region between continental margins and mid-ocean ridges, usually at depths below 4 km (13,000 ft). The ocean surface is very poor in nutrients such as nitrate, phosphate and iron, limiting the growth of phytoplankton; this results in low sedimentation rates. The sediment tends to be very poor in nutrients, so not all the oxygen is consumed; oxygen has been found all the way down to the underlying rock. In such environments, cells are mostly either strictly aerobic or facultative anaerobic (using oxygen where available but able to switch to other electron acceptors in its absence) and they are heterotrophic (not primary producers). They include Pseudomonadota, Chloroflexota, Marine Group II archaea and lithoautotrophs in the Nitrososphaerota phylum. Fungi are diverse, including members of the Ascomycota and Basidiomycota phyla as well as yeasts.

Passive margins (continental shelves and slopes) are under relatively shallow water. Upwelling brings nutrient-rich water to the surface, stimulating abundant growth of phytoplankton, which then settle to the bottom (a phenomenon known as the biological pump). Thus, there is a lot of organic material in the sediments, and all the oxygen is used up in its consumption. They have very stable temperature and pressure profiles. The population of microbes is orders of magnitude greater than in the abyssal plains. It includes strict anaerobes including members of the Chloroflexi phylum, "Ca. Atribacteria", sulfate-reducing bacteria, and fermenters, methanogens and methanotrophs in Archaea. Fungi are less diverse than in abyssal plains, mainly including Ascomycota and yeasts. Viruses in the Inoviridae, Siphoviridae, and Lipothrixviridae families have been identified.

==== Rocks ====
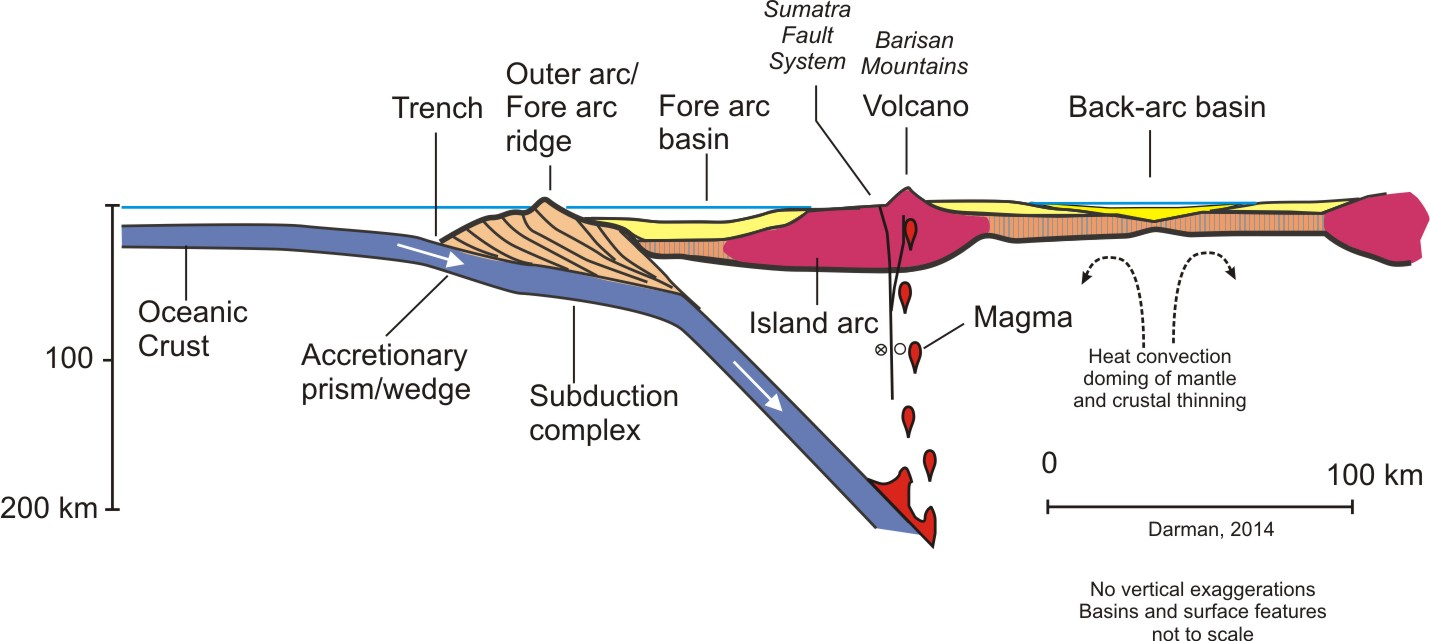
Schematic of the Sumatra Trench and the associated island arcs and back-arc regions

Ocean crust forms at mid-ocean ridges and is removed by subduction. The top half kilometer or so is a series of basaltic flows, and only this layer has enough porosity and permeability to allow fluid flow. Less suitable for life are the layers of sheeted dikes and gabbros underneath.

Mid-ocean ridges are a hot, rapidly changing environment with a steep vertical temperature gradient, so life can only exist in the top few meters. High-temperature interactions between water and rock reduce sulfates, producing abundant sulfides that serve as energy sources; they also strip the rock of metals that can be sources of energy or toxic. Along with degassing from magma, water interactions also produce a lot of methane and hydrogen. No drilling has yet been accomplished here, so information on microbes comes from samples of hydrothermal fluids coming out of vents.

About 5 km (16,000 ft) off the ridge axis, when the crust is about 1 million years old, ridge flanks begin. Characterized by hydrothermal circulation, they extend to about 80 million years in age. This circulation is driven by latent heat from the cooling of crust, which heats seawater and drives it up through more permeable rock. Energy sources come from alteration of the rock, some of which is mediated by living organisms. In the younger crust, there is a lot of iron and sulfur cycling. Sediment cover slows the cooling and reduces the flow of water. There is little evidence of microbe activity in older (more than 10 million year old) crust.

Near subduction zones, volcanoes can form in island arcs and back-arc regions. The subducting plate releases volatiles and solutes to these volcanoes, resulting in acidic fluids with higher concentrations of gases and metals than in the mid-ocean ridge. It also releases water that can mix with mantle material to form serpentinite. When hotspot volcanoes occur in the middle of oceanic plates, they create permeable and porous basalts with higher concentrations of gas than at mid-ocean ridges. Hydrothermal fluids are cooler and have a lower sulfide content. Iron-oxidizing bacteria create extensive deposits of iron oxides.

==== Porewater ====
Microorganisms live in the cracks, holes and empty space inside sediments and rocks. Such empty space provides water and dissolved nutrients to the microorganisms. Note that as the depth increases, there are less nutrients in the porewater as nutrients are continuously consumed by microorganisms. As the depth increases, the sediment is more compact and there is less space between mineral grains. As a result, there is less porewater per volume. The environment gets drier and drier when sediments are transitioned into rocks. At this stage, water can also be a limiting factor to the deep biosphere.

=== Continents ===
Continents have a complex history and a great variety of rocks, sediments and soils; the climate on the surface, temperature profiles and hydrology also vary. Most of the information on subsurface life comes from a small number of sampling sites that are mainly in North America. With the exception of ice cores, densities of cells decline steeply with depth, decreasing by several orders of magnitude. In the top one or two meters of soils, organisms depend on oxygen and are heterotrophs, depending on the breakdown of organic carbon for their nutrition, and their decline in density parallels that of the organic material. Below that, there is no correlation, although both cell density and organic content declines by a further five orders of magnitude or so (by contrast, there is a correlation in ocean sediments). Increasing depth, temperature and salinity do correlate with declining cell numbers, although the rates depend strongly on type of crust and rate of groundwater recharge.

Microbes have been found in sedimentary rocks down to about 3 km (1.9 mi), the deepest sampled. There is a lot of diversity, although the deepest tend to be iron(III)- or sulfate-reducing bacteria that use fermentation and can thrive in high temperature and salinity. Even more salt-tolerant halophiles have been found in deep salt deposits, which are found all over the world. In 2019 microbial organisms were discovered living 2,400 meters below the surface, breathing sulfur and eating rocks such as pyrite as their regular food source. The discovery occurred in the oldest known water on Earth. A study of biosignatures in vein mineral samples from more than 30 deep mines in the Fennoscandian Shield proves that signatures of ancient life are omnipresent across the shield.

Humans have accessed deep aquifers in igneous rocks for a variety of purposes including groundwater extraction, mining, and storage of hazardous wastes. Most or all of these aquifers host microbes. At all the sites that have been tested, hydrogen, methane and carbon dioxide have been found. Hydrogen-based communities of prokaryotes have also been found in hot springs and hydrothermal systems. A variety of mechanisms have been proposed for the production of hydrogen, some of which would be independent of photosynthesis.

== Ecology ==
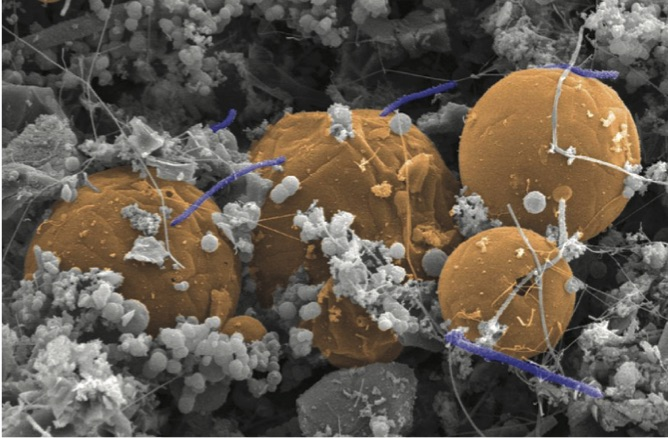
The purplish rod-shaped cells, a few microns long, are "Candidatus Desulforudis audaxviator".

One species of bacteria, "Candidatus Desulforudis audaxviator", is the first known to comprise a complete ecosystem by itself. It was found 2.8 km (1.7 mi) below the surface in a gold mine near Johannesburg, South Africa. In alkaline water at a temperature of about 60 °C, with no access to oxygen, it gets energy by reducing sulfate, its nitrogen from ammonia molecules and ammonium ions, and its carbon from carbon dioxide or formate. Stable isotope records of (secondary) fracture-lining minerals of the continental igneous rock-hosted deep biosphere point to long-term occurrence of methanogenesis, methanotrophy and sulfate reduction. Morphological and spatiotemporal relations point to potential syntrophic relation of these prokaryotic metabolisms with fungi.

Other ecosystems have multiple interdependent species. They can be divided into autotrophs, which derive energy from non-living sources, and heterotrophs, which feed on autotrophs or their remains. Some organisms engage in syntrophy, where one organism lives off the byproducts of another's metabolic activity. At the surface, most autotrophs use photosynthesis, but where there is no light, chemoautotrophs make use of chemical energy.

In marine sediments where oxygen is available, a major group of chemoautotrophs is ammonia-oxidizing Nitrososphaerota archaea. It supports 19% of the heterotrophic production. In some environments such as abyssal Pacific Ocean sediments, the supply of ammonia dwindles with depth; but in other environments ammonia actually increases because heterotrophic bacteria, living on organic material, remineralize the ammonia. This interdependence of the heterotrophic bacteria and Nitrososphaerota is an example of syntrophy. However, some Nitrososphaerota are mixotrophic, able to use both organic matter and carbon dioxide for carbon.

In anoxic sediments, hydrogen is an important "edible". Members of the Chloroflexi bacterial phylum draw energy from it to produce acetate by reducing carbon dioxide or organic matter (a process known as acetogenesis). Metal-reducing and sugar-fermenting Bacteroidetes produce propionate, among other compounds, and this is fermented by "Ca. Atribacteria" to produce hydrogen. In upper sediments, sulfate-reducing bacteria take up most of the hydrogen, while in lower sediments the sulfate is depleted and methanogens dominate. In the sulfate-methane transition zone (SMTZ), anaerobic methanotrophic (ANME) archaea form consortia with sulfate-reducing bacteria.

== See also ==
- Deep Carbon Observatory § Deep Life
- Dark oxygen
- Endolith
- Extremophile
- Lithophile
- Oligotroph
- Rare biosphere
- Subsurface lithoautotrophic microbial ecosystem
