= Geomicrobiology =

Intersection of microbiology and geology

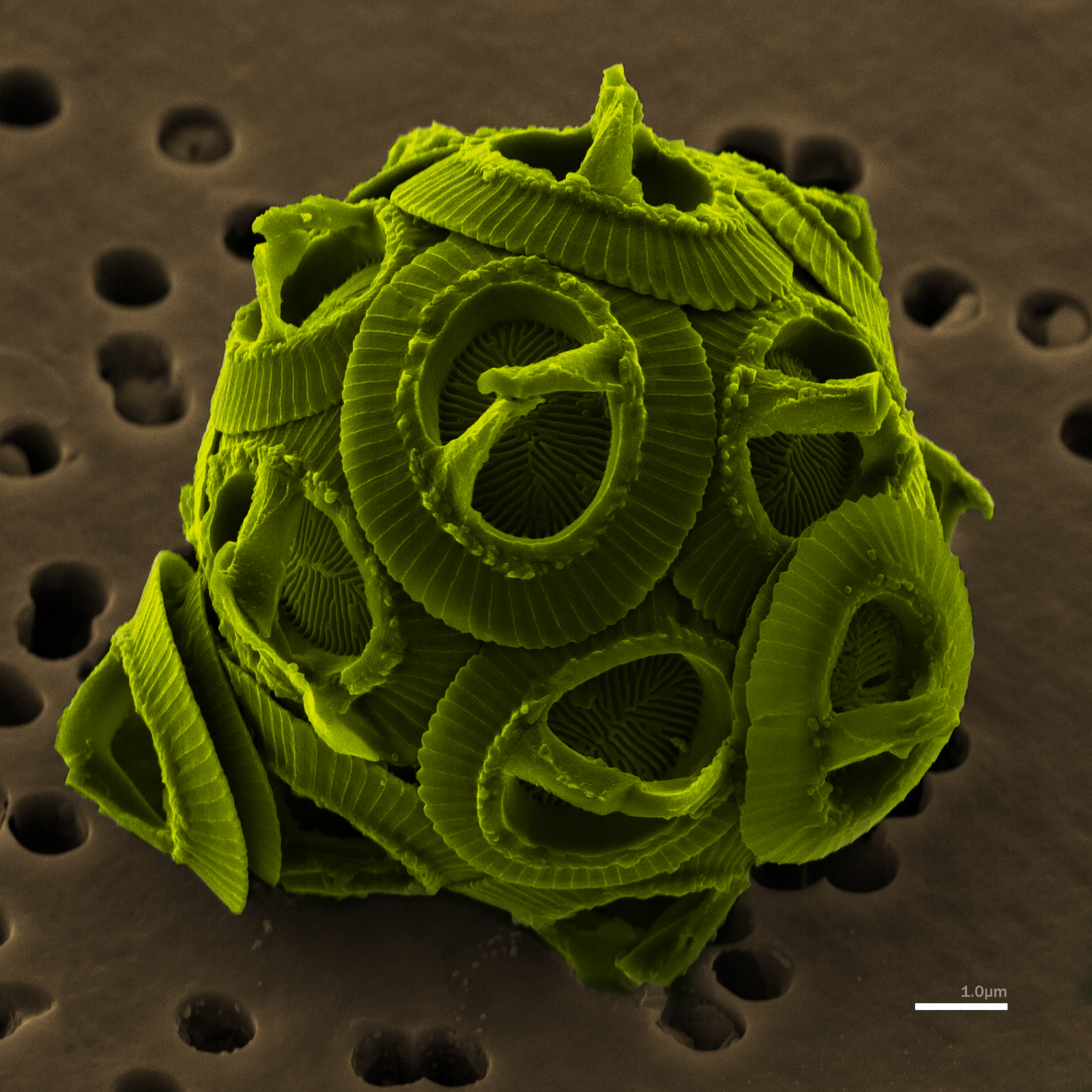
The coccolithophore Gephyrocapsa oceanica may become an important carbon sink as the acidity of the ocean increases.

Geomicrobiology is the scientific field at the intersection of geology and microbiology and is a major subfield of geobiology. It concerns the role of microbes on geological and geochemical processes and effects of minerals and metals to microbial growth, activity and survival. Such interactions occur in the geosphere (rocks, minerals, soils, and sediments), the atmosphere and the hydrosphere. Geomicrobiology studies microorganisms that are driving the Earth's biogeochemical cycles, mediating mineral precipitation and dissolution, and sorbing and concentrating metals. The applications include for example bioremediation, mining, climate change mitigation and public drinking water supplies.

== Rocks and minerals ==
=== Microbe-aquifer interactions ===
Microorganisms are known to impact aquifers by modifying their rates of dissolution. In the karstic Edwards Aquifer, microbes colonizing the aquifer surfaces enhance the dissolution rates of the host rock.

In the oceanic crustal aquifer, the largest aquifer on Earth, microbial communities can impact ocean productivity, sea water chemistry as well as geochemical cycling throughout the geosphere. The mineral make-up of the rocks affects the composition and abundance of these subseafloor microbial communities present. Through bioremediation some microbes can aid in decontaminating freshwater resources in aquifers contaminated by waste products.

== Microbially precipitated minerals ==
Some bacteria use metal ions as their energy source. They convert (or chemically reduce) the dissolved metal ions from one electrical state to another. This reduction releases energy for the bacteria's use, and, as a side product, serves to concentrate the metals into what ultimately become ore deposits. Biohydrometallurgy or in situ mining is where low-grade ores may be attacked by well-studied microbial processes under controlled conditions to extract metals. Certain iron, copper, uranium and even gold ores are thought to have formed as the result of microbe action.

Subsurface environments, like aquifers, are attractive locations when selecting repositories for nuclear waste, carbon dioxide (See carbon sequestration), or as artificial reservoirs for natural gas. Understanding microbial activity within the aquifer is important since it may interact with and effect the stability of the materials within the underground repository. Microbe-mineral interactions contribute to biofouling and microbially induced corrosion. Microbially induced corrosion of materials, such as carbon steel, have serious implications in the safe storage of radioactive waste within repositories and storage containers.

== Environmental remediation ==
Microbes are being studied and used to degrade organic and even nuclear waste pollution (see Deinococcus radiodurans) and assist in environmental cleanup. An application of geomicrobiology is bioleaching, the use of microbes to extract metals from mine waste.

=== Soil and sediment: microbial remediation ===
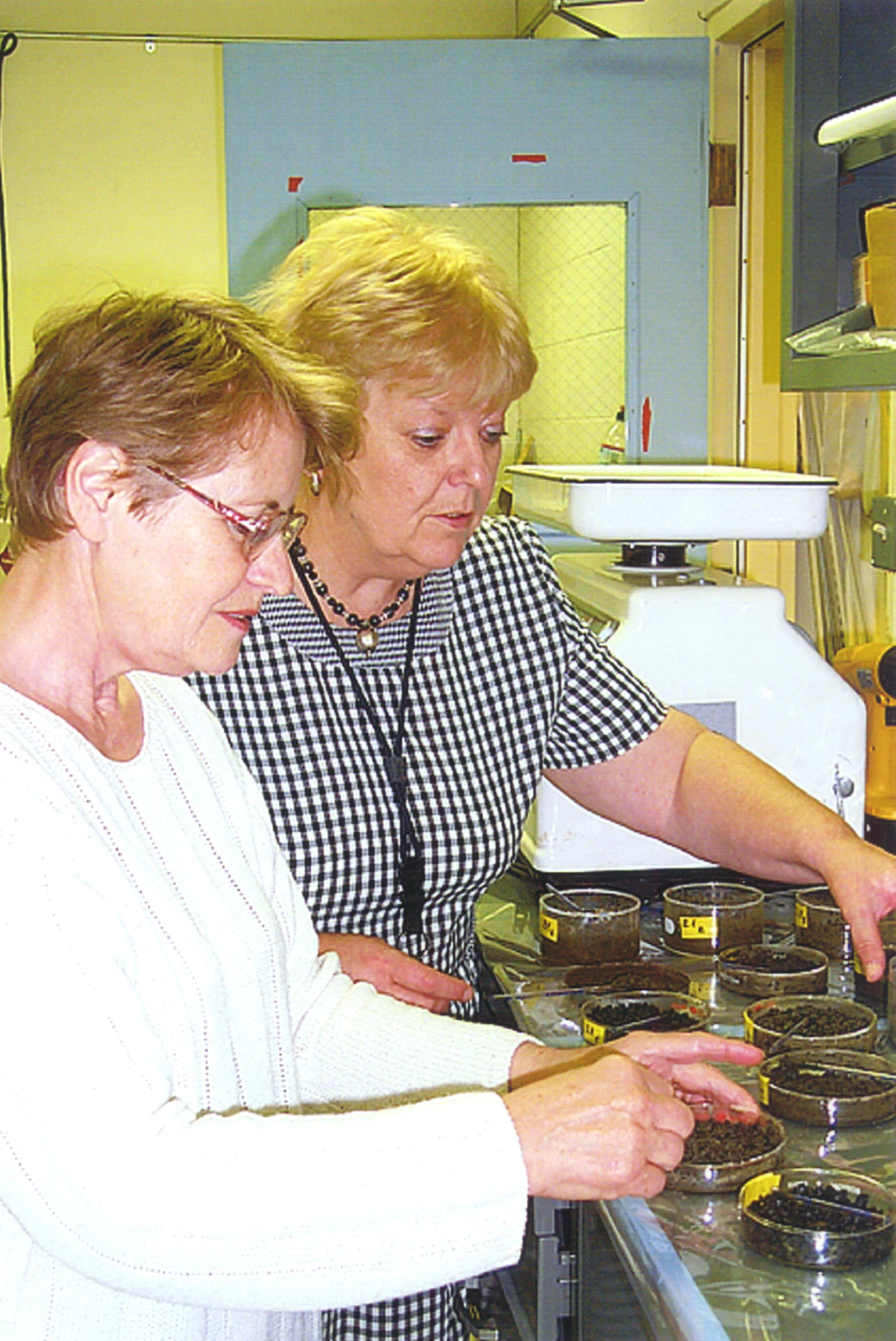
Two scientists prepare samples of soil mixed with oil to test a microbe's ability to clean up contaminated soil.

Microbial remediation is used in soils to remove contaminants and pollutants. Microbes play a key role in many biogeochemistry cycles and can effect a variety of soil properties, such as biotransformation of mineral and metal speciation, toxicity, mobility, mineral precipitation, and mineral dissolution. Microbes play a role in the immobilization and detoxification of a variety of elements, such as metals, radionuclides, sulfur and phosphorus, in the soil. Thirteen metals are considered priority pollutants (Sb, As, Be, Cd, Cr, Cu, Pb, Ni, Se, Ag, Tl, Zn, Hg). Soils and sediment act as sinks for metals which originate from both natural sources through rocks and minerals as well as anthropogenic sources through agriculture, industry, mining, waste disposal, among others.

Many heavy metals, such as chromium (Cr), at low concentrations are essential micronutrients in the soil, however they can be toxic at higher concentrations. Heavy metals are added into soils through many anthropogenic sources such industry and/or fertilizers. Heavy metal interaction with microbes can increase or decrease the toxicity. Levels of chromium toxicity, mobility and bioavailability depend on oxidation states of chromium. Two of the most common chromium species are Cr(III) and Cr(VI). Cr(VI) is highly mobile, bioavailable and more toxic to flora and fauna, while Cr(III) is less toxic, more immobile and readily precipitates in soils with pH > 6. Utilizing microbes to facilitate the transformation of Cr(VI) to Cr(III) is an environmentally friendly, low cost bioremediation technique to help mitigate toxicity in the environment.

=== Acid mine drainage ===
Another application of geomicrobiology is bioleaching, the use of microbes to extract metals from mine waste. For example, sulfate-reducing bacteria (SRB) produce H_{2}S which precipitates metals as a metal sulfide. This process removed heavy metals from mine waste which is one of the major environmental issues associated with acid mine drainage (along with a low pH).

Bioremediation techniques are also used on contaminated surface water and ground water often associated with acid mine drainage. Studies have shown that the production of bicarbonate by microbes such as sulfate-reducing bacteria adds alkalinity to neutralize the acidity of the mine drainage waters. Hydrogen ions are consumed while bicarbonate is produced which leads to an increase in pH (decrease in acidity).

=== Microbial degradation of hydrocarbons ===
Microbes can affect the quality of oil and gas deposits through their metabolic processes. Microbes can influence the development of hydrocarbons by being present at the time of deposition of the source sediments or by dispersing through the rock column to colonize reservoir or source lithologies after the generation of hydrocarbons.

== Early Earth history and astrobiology ==
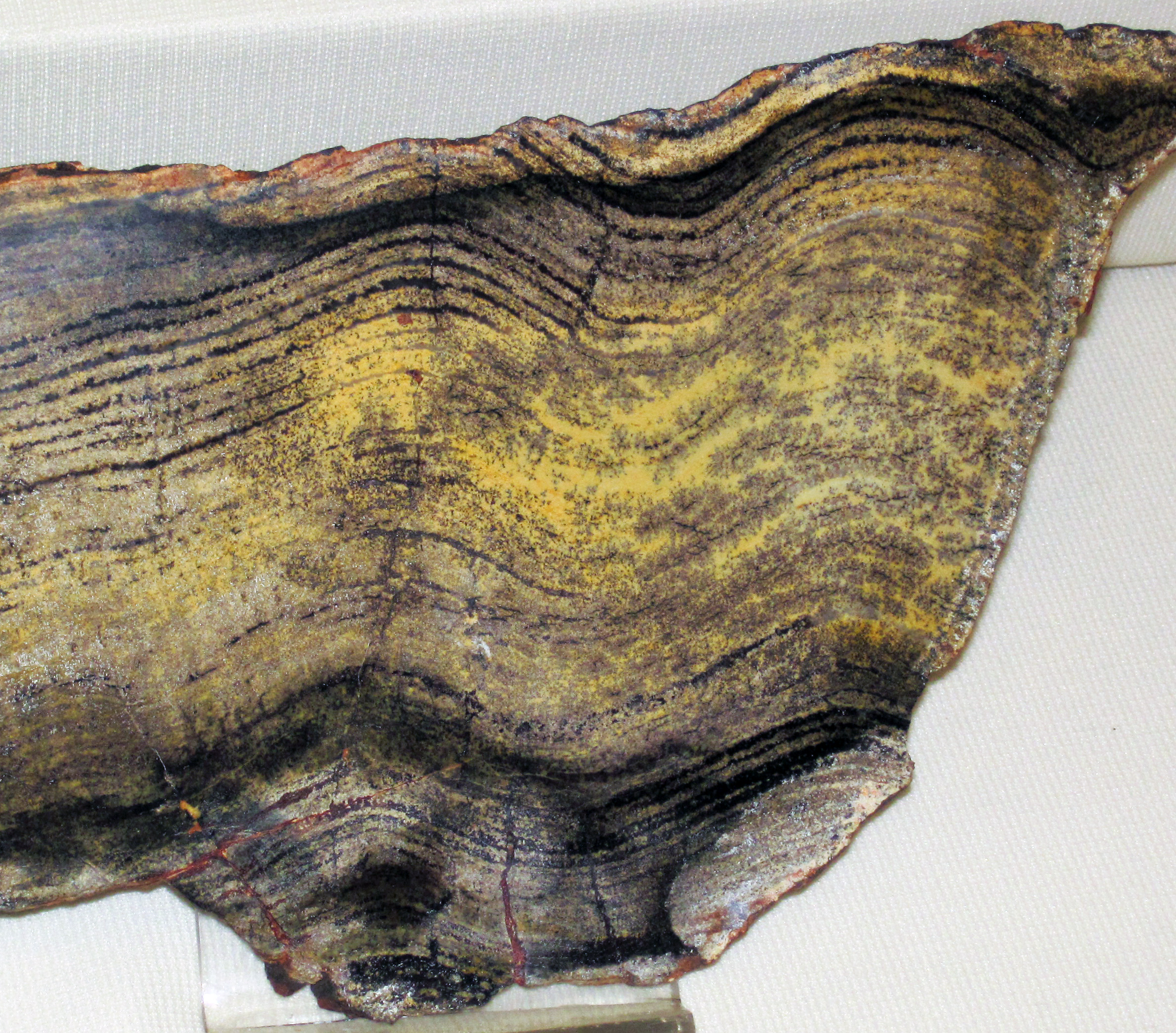
Paleoarchean (3.35–3.46 billion years old) stromatolite from Western Australia.

A common field of study within geomicrobiology is origin of life on earth or other planets. Various rock-water interactions, such as serpentinization and water radiolysis, are possible sources of metabolic energy to support chemolithoautotrophic microbial communities on Early Earth and on other planetary bodies such as Mars, Europa and Enceladus.

Interactions between microbes and sediment record some of the earliest evidence of life on earth. Information on the life during Archean Earth is recorded in bacterial fossils and stromatolites preserved in precipitated lithologies such as chert or carbonates. Additional evidence of early life on land around 3.5 billion years ago can be found in the Dresser Formation of Australia in a hot spring facies, indicating that some of Earth's earliest life on land occurred in hot springs. Microbially induced sedimentary structures (MISS) are found throughout the geologic record up to 3.2 billion years old. They are formed by the interaction of microbial mats and physical sediment dynamics, and record paleoenvironmental data as well as providing evidence of early life. The paleoenvironments of early life on Earth also serve as models when searching for potential fossil life on Mars.

=== Extremophiles ===
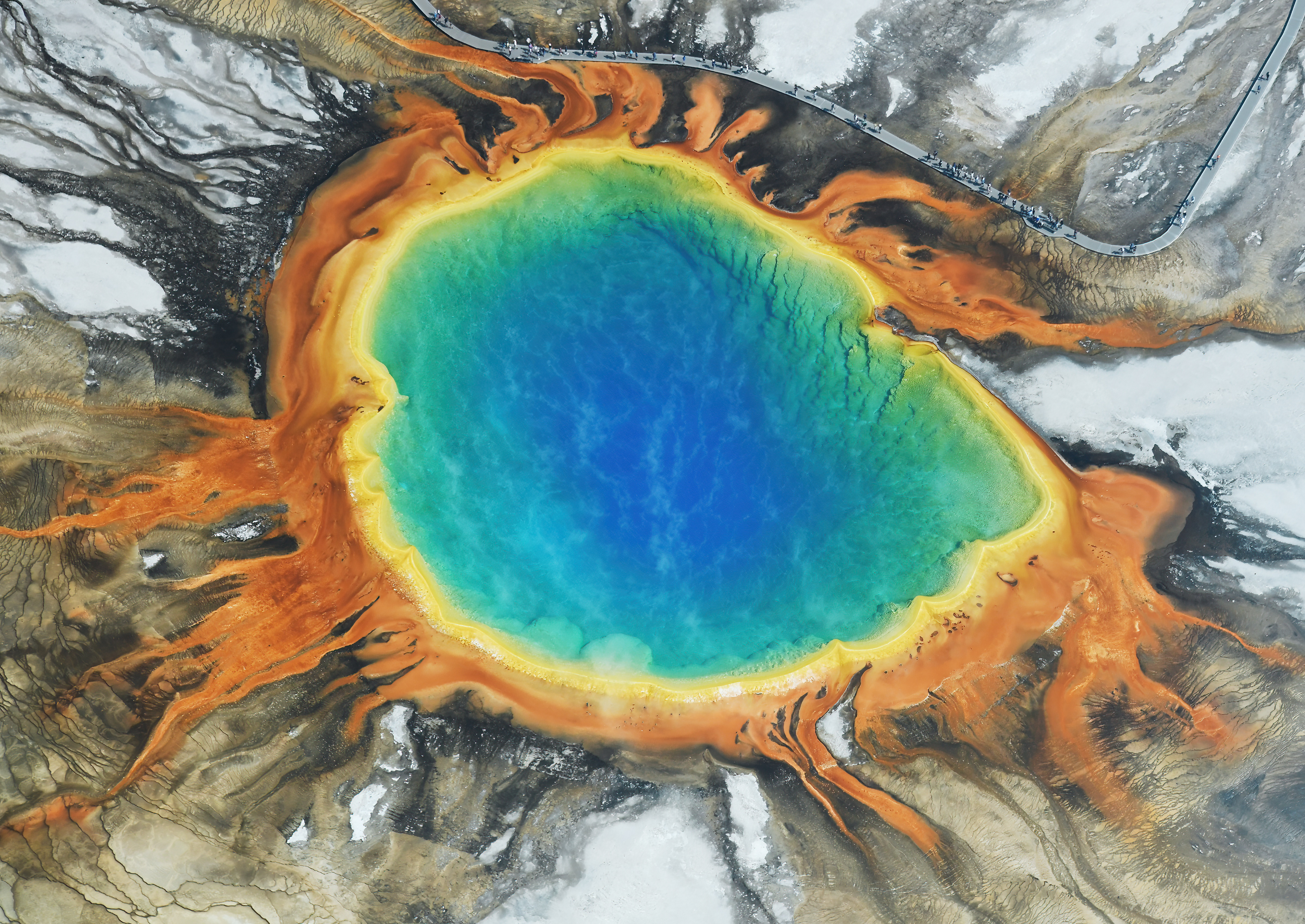
The colors of Grand Prismatic Spring in Yellowstone National Park are due to mats of thermophilic bacteria.

Another area of investigation in geomicrobiology is the study of extremophile organisms, the microorganisms that thrive in environments normally considered hostile to life. Such environments may include extremely hot (hot springs or mid-ocean ridge black smoker) environments, extremely saline environments, or even space environments such as Martian soil or comets.

Observations and research in hyper-saline lagoon environments in Brazil and Australia as well as slightly saline, inland lake environments in northwestern China have shown that anaerobic sulfate-reducing bacteria may be directly involved in the formation of dolomite. This suggests the alteration and replacement of limestone sediments by dolomitization in ancient rocks was possibly aided by ancestors to these anaerobic bacteria.

In July 2019, a scientific study of Kidd Mine in Canada discovered sulfur-breathing organisms which live 2,400 metres (7,900 ft) below the surface, and which breathe sulfur in order to survive. These organisms are also remarkable due to eating rocks such as pyrite as their regular food source.

== See also ==
- Bacterial oxidation
- Desulforudis audaxviator
- Deep biosphere
