= Future of Marine Animal Populations =

The Future of Marine Animal Populations (FMAP) project was one of the core projects of the international Census of Marine Life (2000–2010). FMAP's mission is to describe and synthesize globally changing patterns of species abundance, distribution, and diversity, and to model the effects of fishing, climate change and other key variables on those patterns. This work was done across ocean realms and with an emphasis on understanding past changes and predicting future scenarios.

== History ==
FMAP emerged from a workshop held at Dalhousie University in 2002 and was funded from 2003 to 2010 by the Alfred P. Sloan Foundation. The project was led by Ransom A. Myers from 2002 to 2007 and from 2007 to 2010 was under the direction of Boris Worm, Heike Lotze and Ian Jonsen in the Biology Department at Dalhousie University.

== Core research topics ==
- Marine animals: Spatial distribution and movement of marine animal. FMAP team members analyzed electronic tracking data for large marine animals in combination with environmental data to better understand how environmental change may influence the movement of animals and consequently patterns in their distribution. In addition to gaining mechanistic knowledge of movement behaviours and patterns, maps were created of species' seasonal distributions, inferred from the tracking data.
- Marine biodiversity: Global patterns on marine biodiversity. FMAP researchers overlaid spatial diversity patterns for different species groups, searching for local hotspots and coldspots, regional overlap between different groups and global spatial gradients in marine diversity. Overlaying standardized species richness patterns for diverse animal groups enabled description of taxon-specific and cross-taxa patterns as well as driving factors. The work of FMAP also aimed to understand the underlying processes and causes of such patterns and the factors that may deter them.
- Marine ecosystems: Long term changes in marine ecosystems. FMAP team members compiled data on historical changes in the abundance, distribution and diversity of marine species and analyzed them in combination with environmental and anthropogenic factors, in order to help determine the causes of long-term changes in marine biodiversity. The goal was to synthesize long-term trends and large-scale changes in marine animal populations and ecosystems to add a temporal dimension to spatial patterns and short-term dynamics in marine populations and diversity. Analyses of the underlying drivers and consequences of these changes were also explored in order to evaluate current and potential future trends in marine biodiversity.

== Contributions ==
The FMAP project coordinated major data synthesis efforts to derive global trends and patterns in marine biodiversity. From 2003 to 2011, FMAP team members have contributed over 110 scientific articles to peer-reviewed journals, including numerous publications in top-tier journals such as Science and Nature. Publications by FMAP scientists have also included many book chapters, policy publications and outreach articles. Topics of research have included patterns of species abundance, distribution and diversity, and the effects of climate change, overfishing and other key human threats on these patterns. FMAP has performed analyses on a variety of organisms, including coral reefs, large pelagic fish, marine mammals, sea turtles and invertebrates.

A major output of the project was the development of advanced statistical tools for analyzing observational data to study how marine biodiversity is distributed and changing over time, and to better understand the movements and distribution of marine predators. FMAP's research was presented as part of the culmination of The Census of Marine Life, which was celebrated in October 2010 in London, England. FMAP research formed an integral part of the overall findings of the program, which were disseminated through major media outlets around the globe.

== Scientific highlights ==
- New discovered method estimates that Earth is home to 8.7 million species, of which 2.1 million live in the ocean.
- Reported severe depletion of large marine animals over the past 50 to 500 years. An up to 90% reduction in the abundance of large, commercially exploited marine megafauna has occurred since human impacts began, along with a reduction of total animal biomass and the local extinction of particular species.
- Identified ecosystem consequences of losing marine biodiversity: changes in abundance and diversity have negatively impacted ecosystem productivity and resilience, and compromised water quality, fishery yields and other ecosystem services. Conservation and management efforts over the last century have halted or even reversed the decline of biodiversity in some areas. Yet in areas where there are few management initiatives in place, the abundance and diversity of marine animal populations continues to decline, mostly in direct relation to multiple human impacts.
- Discovered global patterns of biodiversity for tuna and billfish, sharks, and marine mammals, which are different from those generalized for terrestrial environments.
- Used the entire Census database to identify global hotspots of marine biodiversity across 13 major taxa, and identified water temperature as the main environmental predictor of biodiversity patterns in the ocean. Sea surface temperature was found to be the primary oceanographic driver of marine animal distribution and diversity at global scales.
- Reported a slow, global decline in plankton abundance since the beginning of oceanographic measurements in the late 19th century that appeared to be linked to gradual ocean warming and increased stratification of the water column.
- Examined how marine biodiversity might change over the next 50 years. The future of marine animal populations is likely determined in large part by two key variables: the rate of ocean warming, and the rate of exploitation. Where those rates are low, it will increase the chance for adaptation and recovery. Where they continue to rise, the loss of marine biodiversity and associated services will be severe.
- Developed new methods to better understand the dynamic movement and habitat use of marine animals. Results indicate that spatial patterns of animal behaviours are markedly discrete and predictable both seasonally and inter-annually, implying strong connections to environmental drivers and prey distribution.

== See also ==
- Census of Marine Life
- Pacific Ocean Shelf Tracking Project (POST)
- Natural Geography in Shore Areas (NaGISA)
- Ocean Biogeographic Information System (OBIS)
- List of harvested aquatic animals by weight
- Sloan foundation
