= Imants Priede =

British-Latvian zoologist

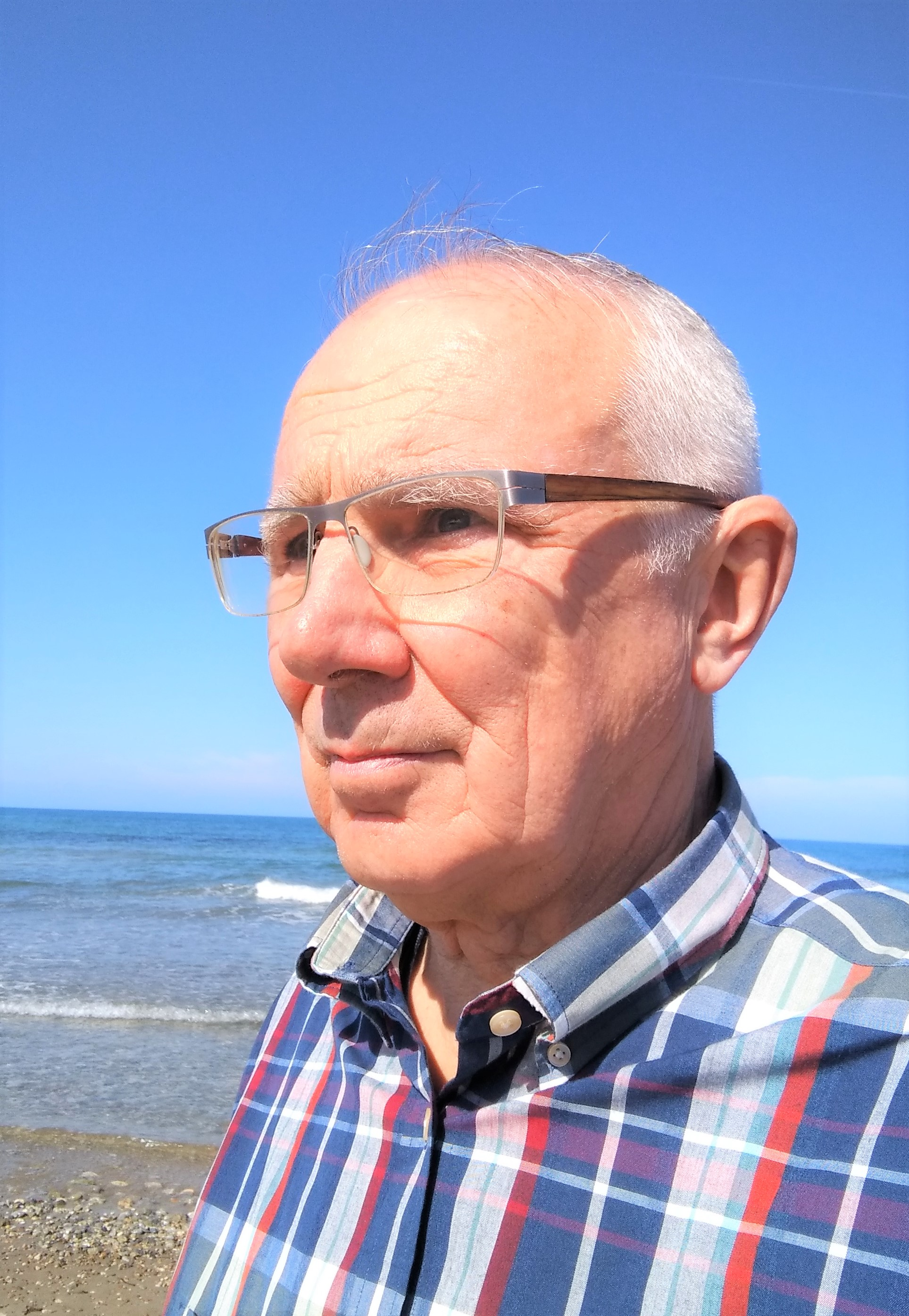
- Born: 21 May 1948 (age 78); Windsor, England
- Occupations: Zoologist, author and academic

Academic background
- Education: Bangor University; University of Stirling; University of Aberdeen

Academic work
- Institutions: University of Aberdeen
- Notable works: Deep-Sea Fishes: Biology, Diversity, Ecology and Fisheries

Imants (Monty) George Priede (born 21 May 1948) is a British-Latvian zoologist, author and academic. He is professor emeritus in the University of Aberdeen, Scotland known for his work on fish and life in the deep sea.

Priede has published over 150 research papers concerned with fish, fisheries and the marine environment. He is author of the textbook Deep-Sea Fishes: Biology, Diversity, Ecology and Fisheries. He is Editor-In-Chief of the journal Deep-Sea Research Part I: Oceanographic Research Papers.

Two species of deep-sea animals have been named in honour of Priede, a worm Prodistomum priedei and a fish Pachycara priedei.

Priede is a fellow of the Royal Society of Edinburgh.

== Early life and education ==
Priede studied Marine Zoology at the Bangor University. Later, he joined University of Stirling where he received his Ph.D. in 1973. His Ph.D. thesis at the University of Stirling was entitled "The physiology of circulation during swimming activity in rainbow trout" for which he received the Huxley Prize of the Zoological Society of London. In 1996, he was awarded the degree of D.Sc. by the University of Aberdeen.

== Career ==
Priede joined University of Aberdeen as a lecturer in 1977. He continued working at University of Aberdeen throughout his career, initially as a Research Fellow, then lecturer and later a Reader in Zoology. He became Professor of Zoology at University of Aberdeen in 1998.

In 2001, Priede founded Oceanlab to undertake world-wide research in the marine environment, conducting surveys in the Atlantic Ocean, Mediterranean Sea, Pacific Ocean and Indian Ocean. He was the director of Oceanlab in the Institute of Biological & Environmental Sciences until 2013, when he retired to become professor emeritus.

In Scotland, Priede was a member of the Council of the Scottish Association for Marine Science (SAMS) and has served on two inquiries by the Royal Society of Edinburgh. Inquiry into the future of the Scottish Fishing Industry (2004) and The Scientific issues Surrounding the control of Infectious Salmon Anaemia (ISA) in Scotland (2002).

== Research and work ==
Priede's early research, from 1973 to 1990, investigated activity of fish in their natural environment through tracking and biotelemetry, and showed how fish minimise their energy expenditure. He pioneered the use of the satellite-based Argos system for tracking of large marine animals when in 1982 he successfully attached a transmitter by hand harpoon to a basking shark and tracked its movements off the west coast of Scotland.

From 1989, Priede co-ordinated or participated in numerous European Commission research projects, concerned with fisheries, deep-sea cabled observatories ESONET, EMSO, Cubic Kilometre Neutrino Telescope (KM3NeT) and marine conservation, Hotspot Ecosystem Research and Man's Impact on European Seas (HERMIONE).

Priede has worked on the problems of migration of salmon and sea trout in the rivers and estuaries of the UK. From 1988 to 1998, he investigated problems of the mackerel and horse mackerel fishery around the British Isles, serving on working groups of ICES (International Council for Exploration of the Sea) and coordinating two EU funded projects on the estimation of the size of these important stocks.

Subsequently, Priede's interest shifted to exploring the deep-sea using unmanned autonomous landers developed by his team at Oceanlab in the University of Aberdeen. They showed that food-falls reaching the deep-sea floor are rapidly intercepted and consumed by abyssal fishes. Using unique ingestible transmitters Priede tracked the swimming speeds of grenadier fishes and found that they are continuously moving across the abyssal plains dispersing over large distances. In 2006 Priede and colleagues published the results of global surveys showing that sharks are essentially absent from depths greater than 3000 meters.

The UK Natural Environment Research Council appointed Priede as the scientific member of the Project board for construction of the Royal Research Ship James Cook. The ship went into service in 2007 and Priede was principal scientist during three subsequent expeditions to the Mid-Atlantic Ridge. These international expeditions formed part of the 2000-2010 Census of Marine Life (CoML) Mid-Atlantic Ridge Ecosystem (MARECO) project. The team mapped and sampled large areas around the Charlie-Gibbs fracture zone discovering new species including unusual free-living Hemichordate, acorn worms.

== Awards and honors ==
- 1974 – Zoological Society of London Thomas Henry Huxley Prize for original contributions to Zoology
- 2011 – Fisheries Society of the British Isles, Beverton Medal for distinguished contributions to fish biology and fisheries science

== Publications ==
=== Books ===
- Experimental Biology at Sea (1983)
- Wildlife Telemetry: Remote Monitoring and Tracking of Animals (1992)
- Deep-Sea Fishes: Biology, Diversity, Ecology and Fisheries (2017)

=== Selected papers ===
- Priede, I. (1984). A basking shark (Cetorhinus maximus) tracked by satellite together with simultaneous remote sensing. Fisheries Research, 2(3), 201–216.
- Priede, I. G., Bagley, P. M., Armstrong, J. D., Smith, K. L., & Merrett, N. R. (1991). Direct measurement of active dispersal of food-falls by deep-sea demersal fishes. Nature, 351(6328), 647–649.
- Priede, I.G. & Watson, J.J. (1993) An evaluation of the daily egg production method for estimating biomass of Atlantic mackerel (Scomber scombrus). Bulletin of Marine Science. 53(2):981-911.
- Priede, I.G., Solbe, J.F., De, L.G., & Nott, J.E. (1988) An acoustic telemetry transmitter for the study of exposure of fish to variations in environmental dissolved oxygen. J.exp.Biol. 140:563-567.
- Priede I.G., Froese R., Bailey D.M., Bergstad O.A., Collins M.A., Dyb J.E., Henriques C., Jones E.G. & King N. (2006) The absence of sharks from abyssal regions of the world's oceans. Proceedings of The Royal Society B. 273: 1435–1441. doi:10.1098/rspb.2005.3461
- Priede, I. G., Godbold, J. A., Niedzielski, T., Collins, M. A., Bailey, D. M., Gordon, J. D. M., & Zuur, A. F. (2010). A review of the spatial extent of fishery effects and species vulnerability of the deep-sea demersal fish assemblage of the Porcupine Seabight, Northeast Atlantic Ocean (ICES Subarea VII). ICES Journal of Marine Science, 68(2), 281–289.
- Priede, I. G., Osborn, K. J., Gebruk, A. V., Jones, D., Shale, D., Rogacheva, A., & Holland, N. D. (2012). Observations on torquaratorid acorn worms (Hemichordata, Enteropneusta) from the North Atlantic with descriptions of a new genus and three new species. Invertebrate Biology, 131(3), 244–257.
- Priede, I. G. (2013). Colonisation of the Deep Sea by Fishes. Journal of Fish Biology. 83: 1528–1550.
- Priede, I. G., Billett, D. S., Brierley, A. S., Hoelzel, A. R., Inall, M., & Miller, P. I. (2013). The ECO-MAR (Ecosystem of the Mid-Atlantic Ridge at the Sub-Polar Front and Charlie Gibbs Fracture Zone) project: description of the benthic sampling programme 2007–2010. Marine Biology Research, 9(5–6), 624–628.
- Linley, T. D., Craig, J., Jamieson, A. J., & Priede, I. G. (2018). Bathyal and abyssal demersal bait-attending fauna of the Eastern Mediterranean Sea. Marine Biology, 165(10).
- Priede, I. G. (2018). Buoyancy of gas-filled bladders at great depth. Deep Sea Research Part I: Oceanographic Research Papers, 132, 1–5.
