= Census of Antarctic Marine Life =

Field project to research the marine biodiversity of Antarctica

- Abbreviation: CAML
- Formation: 2005
- Type: Biological census
- Headquarters: Australian Antarctic Division
- Region served: Antarctica
- Parent organization: Census of Marine Life
- Website: www.caml.aq

The Census of Antarctic Marine Life (CAML) is a field project of the Census of Marine Life that researches the marine biodiversity of Antarctica, how it is affected by climate change, and how this change is altering the ecosystem of the Southern Ocean.

The program started in 2005 as a 5-year initiative with the scientific goal being to study the evolution of life in Antarctic waters, to determine how this has influenced the diversity of the present biota, and use these observations to predict how it might respond to future change. However, due to modern and extravagant changes within technology, we are able to witness and influence biodiversity reproduction and development. This enables us to gain further insight toward characteristics that allow such biodiversity to flourish within this barren desert referred to as the Antarctic.

CAML has collected its data from 18 Antarctic research vessels during the International Polar Year, which is freely accessible at Scientific Committee on Antarctic Research Marine Biodiversity Information Network (SCAR-MarBIN). The Register of Antarctic Marine Species has 9,350 verified species (16,500 taxa) in 17 phyla, from microbes to whales. For 1500 species the DNA barcode is available.

The information from CAML is a robust baseline against which future change may be measured.
