= Deep Research =

Deep Research may refer to:

- ChatGPT Deep Research, an intelligent agent by OpenAI
- Gemini Deep Research, an intelligent agent by Google

== See also ==
- Grok DeepSearch, a Grok-3 intelligent agent by xAI
- Deep Sea Research, an academic journal
