= Intertidal zone =

Area of coast exposed only at low tide

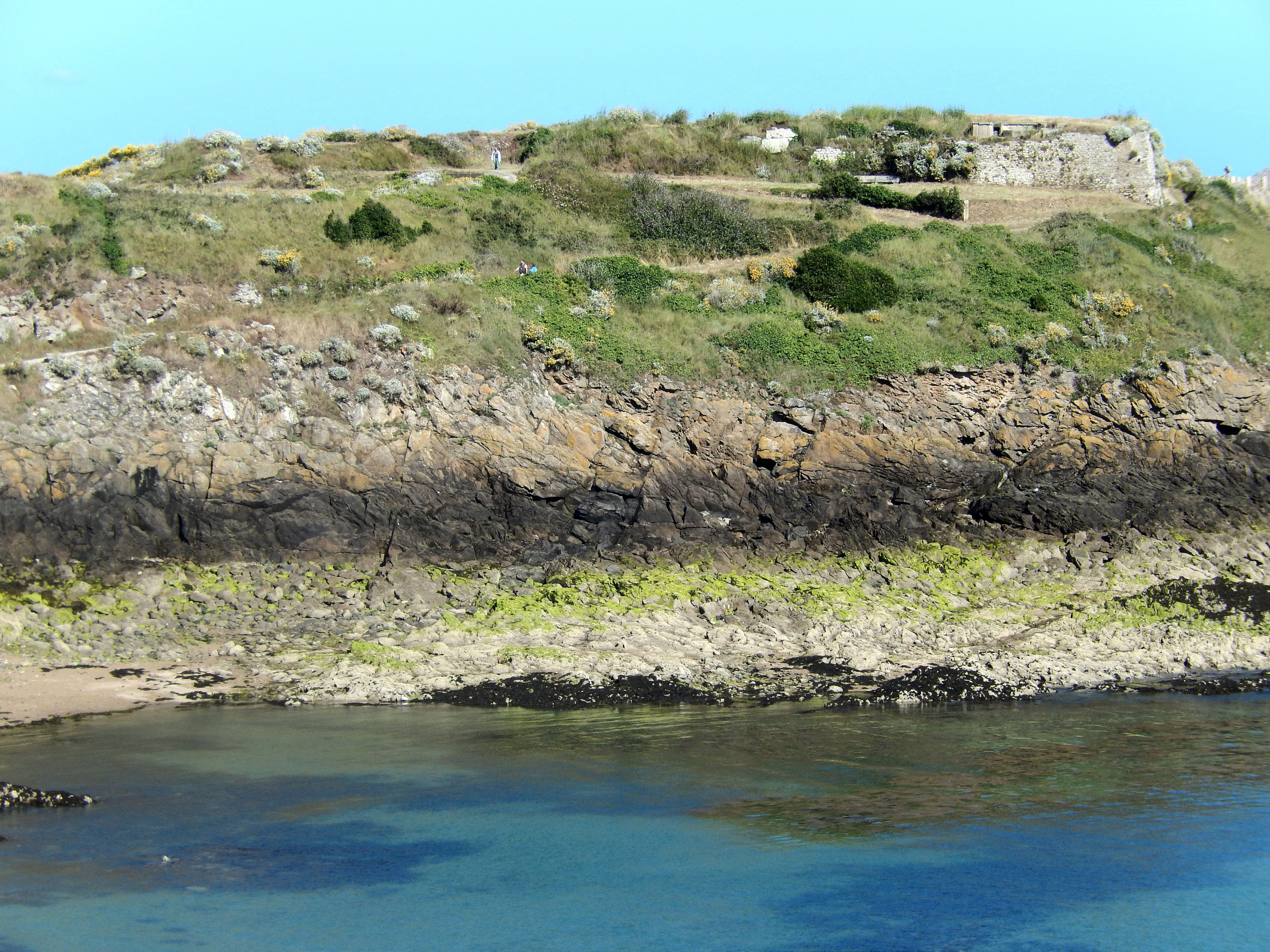
The rocky shoreline of Saint-Malo, northwestern France, with a stripe of the black lichen Hydropunctaria maura at the high tide line

The intertidal zone, or foreshore, is the area above water level at low tide and underwater at high tide; in other words, it is the part of the littoral zone within the tidal range. This area can include several types of habitats with various species of life, such as sea stars, sea urchins, and many species of coral with regional differences in biodiversity. Sometimes it is referred to as the littoral zone or seashore, although those can be defined as a wider region.

The intertidal zone also includes steep rocky cliffs, sandy beaches, bogs or wetlands (e.g., vast mudflats). This area can be a narrow strip, such as in Pacific islands that have only a narrow tidal range, or can include many meters of shoreline where shallow beach slopes interact with high tidal excursion. The peritidal zone is similar but somewhat wider, extending from above the highest tide level to below the lowest. Organisms in the intertidal zone are well-adapted to their environment, facing high levels of interspecific competition and the rapidly changing conditions that come with the tides. The intertidal zone is also home to several species from many different phyla (Porifera, Annelida, Coelenterata, Mollusca, Arthropoda, etc.).

The water that comes with the tides can vary from brackish waters, fresh with rain, to highly saline and dry salt, with drying between tidal inundations. Wave splash can dislodge residents from the littoral zone. With the intertidal zone's high exposure to sunlight, the temperature can range from very hot with full sunshine to near freezing in colder climates. Some microclimates in the littoral zone are moderated by local features and larger plants such as mangroves. Adaptations in the littoral zone allow the utilization of nutrients supplied in high volume on a regular basis from the sea, which is actively moved to the zone by tides. The edges of habitats, in this case the land and sea, are themselves often significant ecosystems, and the littoral zone is a prime example.

A typical rocky shore can be divided into a spray zone or splash zone (also known as the supratidal zone), which is above the spring high-tide line and is covered by water only during storms, and an intertidal zone, which lies between the high and low tidal extremes. Along most shores, the intertidal zone can be clearly separated into the following subzones: high tide zone, middle tide zone, and low tide zone. The intertidal zone is one of a number of marine biomes or habitats, including estuaries, the neritic zone, the photic zone, and deep zones.

== Zonation ==
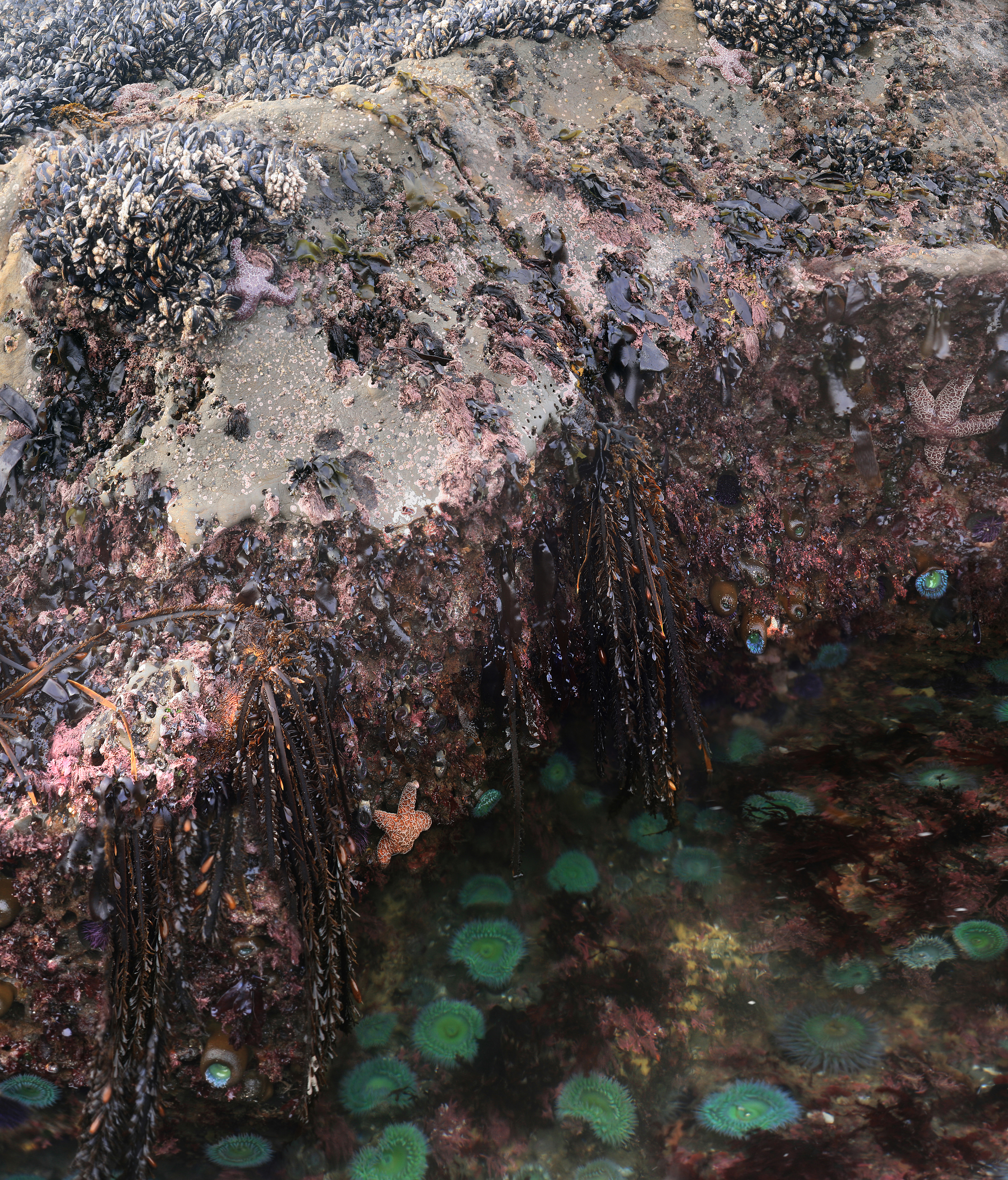
Tide pools at Pillar Point showing zonation on the edge of the rock ledge

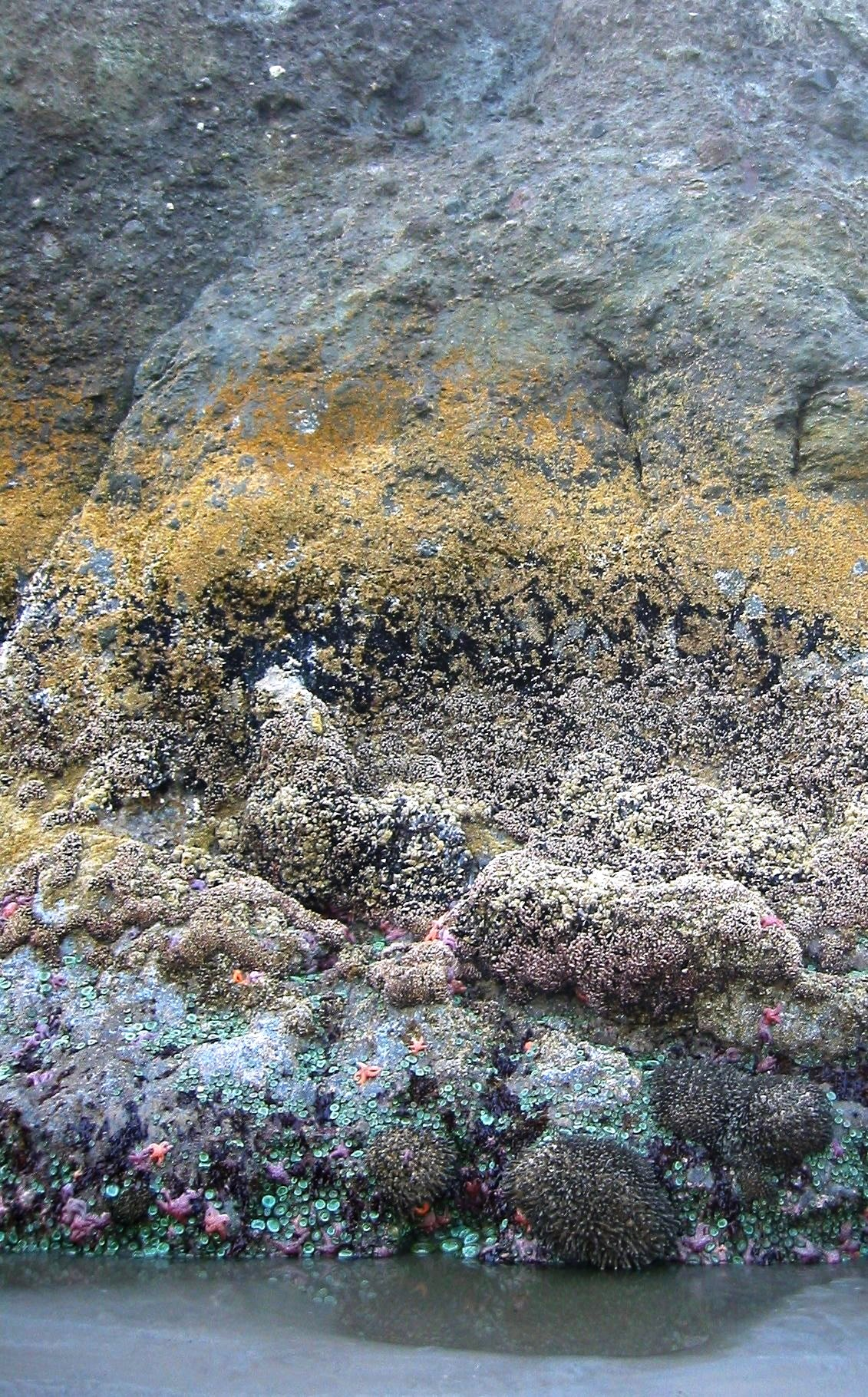
A rock, seen at low tide, exhibiting typical intertidal zonation, Kalaloch, Washington, western United States

Marine biologists divide the intertidal region into three zones (low, middle, and high), based on the overall average exposure of the zone. The low intertidal zone, which borders on the shallow subtidal zone, is only exposed to air at the lowest of low tides and is primarily marine in character. The mid intertidal zone is regularly exposed and submerged by average tides. The high intertidal zone is only covered by the highest of the high tides, and spends much of its time as terrestrial habitat. The high intertidal zone borders on the splash zone (the region above the highest still-tide level, but which receives wave splash). On shores exposed to heavy wave action, the intertidal zone will be influenced by waves, as the spray from breaking waves will extend the intertidal zone.

Depending on the substratum and topography of the shore, additional features may be noticed. On rocky shores, tide pools form in depressions that fill with water as the tide rises. Under certain conditions, such as those at Morecambe Bay, quicksand may form.

== Low tide zone (lower littoral) ==
This subregion is mostly submerged – it is only exposed at the point of low tide and for a longer period of time during extremely low tides. This area is teeming with life; the most notable difference between this subregion and the other three is that there is much more marine vegetation, especially seaweeds. There is also a great biodiversity. Organisms in this zone generally are not well adapted to periods of dryness and temperature extremes. Some of the organisms in this area are abalone, sea anemones, brown seaweed, chitons, crabs, green algae, hydroids, isopods, limpets, mussels, nudibranchs, sculpin, sea cucumber, sea lettuce, sea palms, starfish, sea urchins, shrimp, snails, sponges, surf grass, tube worms, and whelks. Creatures in this area can grow to larger sizes because there is more available energy in the localized ecosystem. Also, marine vegetation can grow to much greater sizes than in the other three intertidal subregions due to the better water coverage. The water is shallow enough to allow plenty of sunlight to reach the vegetation to allow substantial photosynthetic activity, and the salinity is at almost normal levels. This area is also protected from large predators such as fish because of the wave action and the relatively shallow water.

== Ecology ==
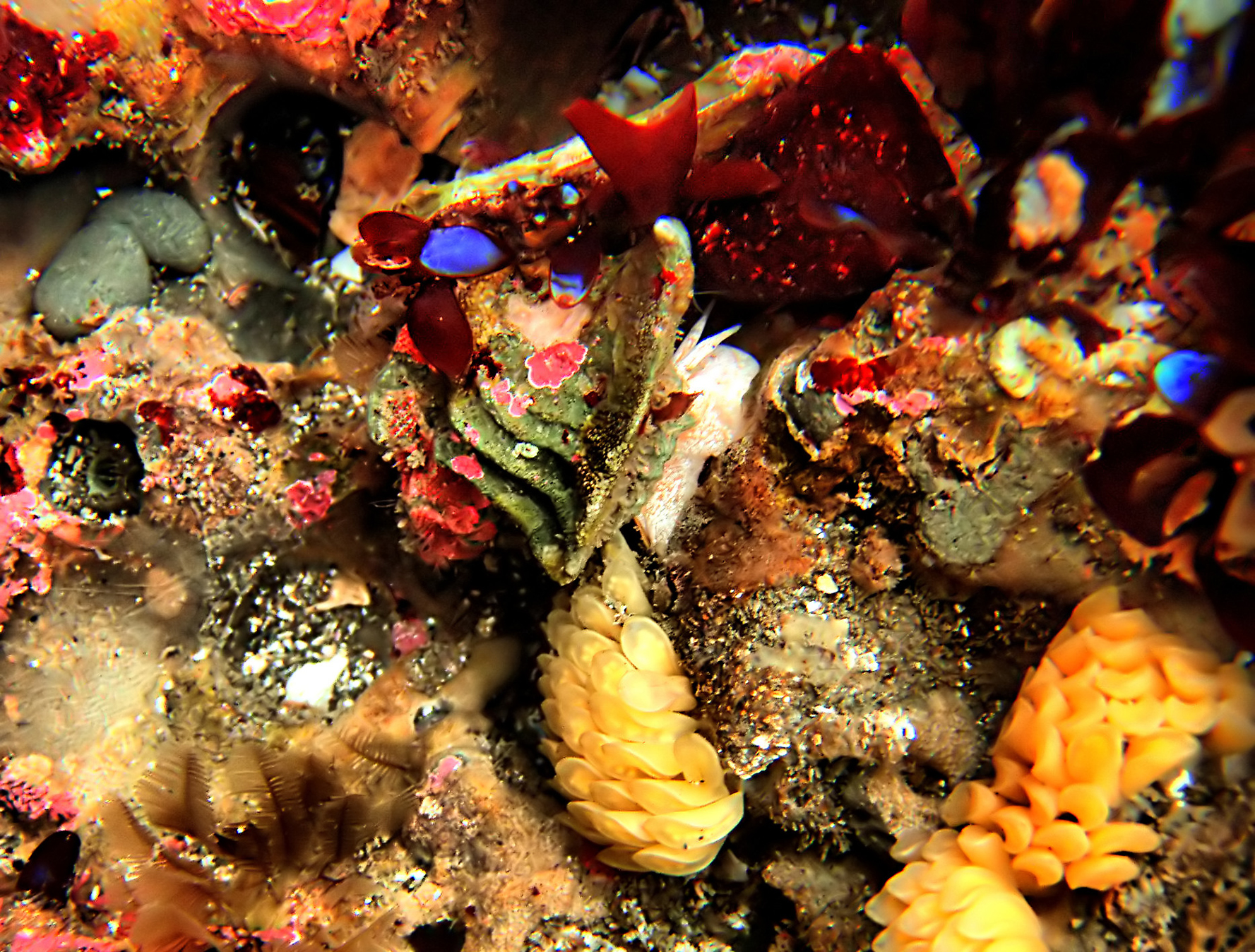
A California tide pool in the low tide zone

The intertidal region is an important model system for the study of ecology, especially on wave-swept rocky shores. The region contains a high diversity of species, and the zonation created by the tides causes species ranges to be compressed into very narrow bands. This makes it relatively simple to study species across their entire cross-shore range, something that can be extremely difficult in, for instance, terrestrial habitats that can stretch thousands of kilometres. Communities on wave-swept shores also have high turnover due to disturbance, so it is possible to watch ecological succession over years rather than decades.

The burrowing invertebrates that make up large portions of sandy beach ecosystems are known to travel relatively great distances in cross-shore directions as beaches change on the order of days, semilunar cycles, seasons, or years. The distribution of some species has been found to correlate strongly with geomorphic datums such as the high tide strand and the water table outcrop.

Since the foreshore is alternately covered by the sea and exposed to the air, organisms living in this environment must be adapted to both wet and dry conditions. Intertidal zone biomass reduces the risk of shoreline erosion from high intensity waves. Typical inhabitants of the intertidal rocky shore include sea urchins, sea anemones, barnacles, chitons, crabs, isopods, mussels, starfish, and many marine gastropod molluscs such as limpets and whelks. Sexual and asexual reproduction varies by inhabitants of the intertidal zones.

Humans have historically used intertidal zones as foraged food sources during low tide. Migratory birds also rely on intertidal species for feeding areas because of low water habitats consisting of an abundance of mollusks and other marine species.

== Legal issues ==
As with the dry sand part of a beach, legal and political disputes can arise over the ownership and use of the foreshore. One recent example is the New Zealand foreshore and seabed controversy. In legal discussions, the foreshore is often referred to as the wet-sand area.

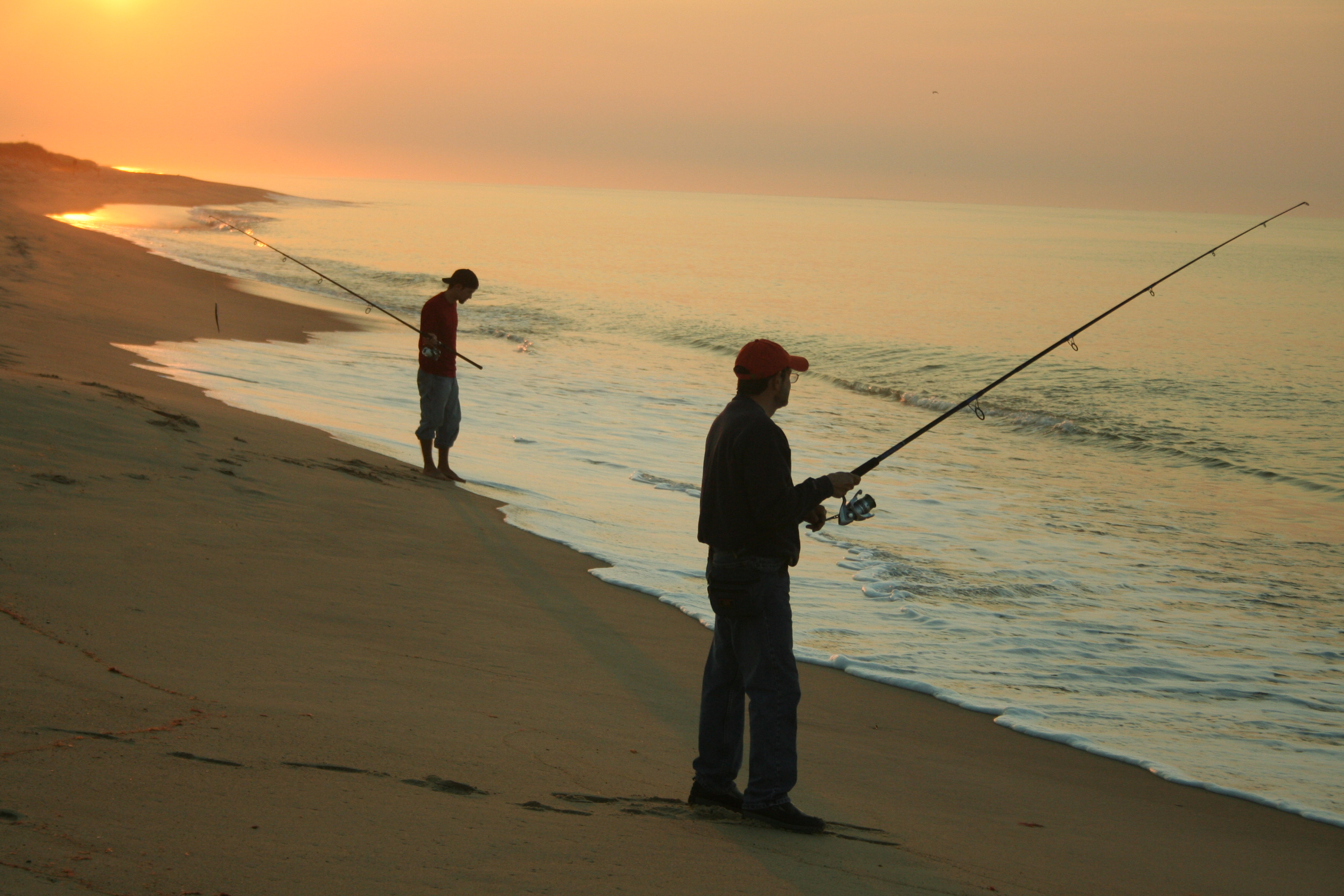
Beach fishing in Edgartown, Massachusetts

For privately owned beaches in the United States, some states such as Massachusetts use the low-water mark as the dividing line between the property of the State and that of the beach owner; however the public still has fishing, fowling, and navigation rights to the zone between low and high water. Other states such as California use the high-water mark.

In the United Kingdom, the foreshore is generally deemed to be owned by the Crown, with exceptions for what are termed several fisheries, which can be historic deeds to title, dating back to King John's time or earlier, and the Udal Law, which applies generally in Orkney and Shetland.

In Greece, according to the L. 2971/01, the foreshore zone is defined as the area of the coast that might be reached by the maximum climbing of the waves on the coast (maximum wave run-up on the coast) in their maximum capacity (maximum referring to the "usually maximum winter waves" and of course not to exceptional cases, such as tsunamis). The foreshore zone, a part of the exceptions of the law, is public, and permanent constructions are not allowed on it. In Italy, about half the shoreline is owned by the government but leased to private beach clubs called lidos.

In the East African and West Indian Ocean, intertidal zone management is often neglected of being a priority due to there being no intent for collective economic productivity.

== Threats ==
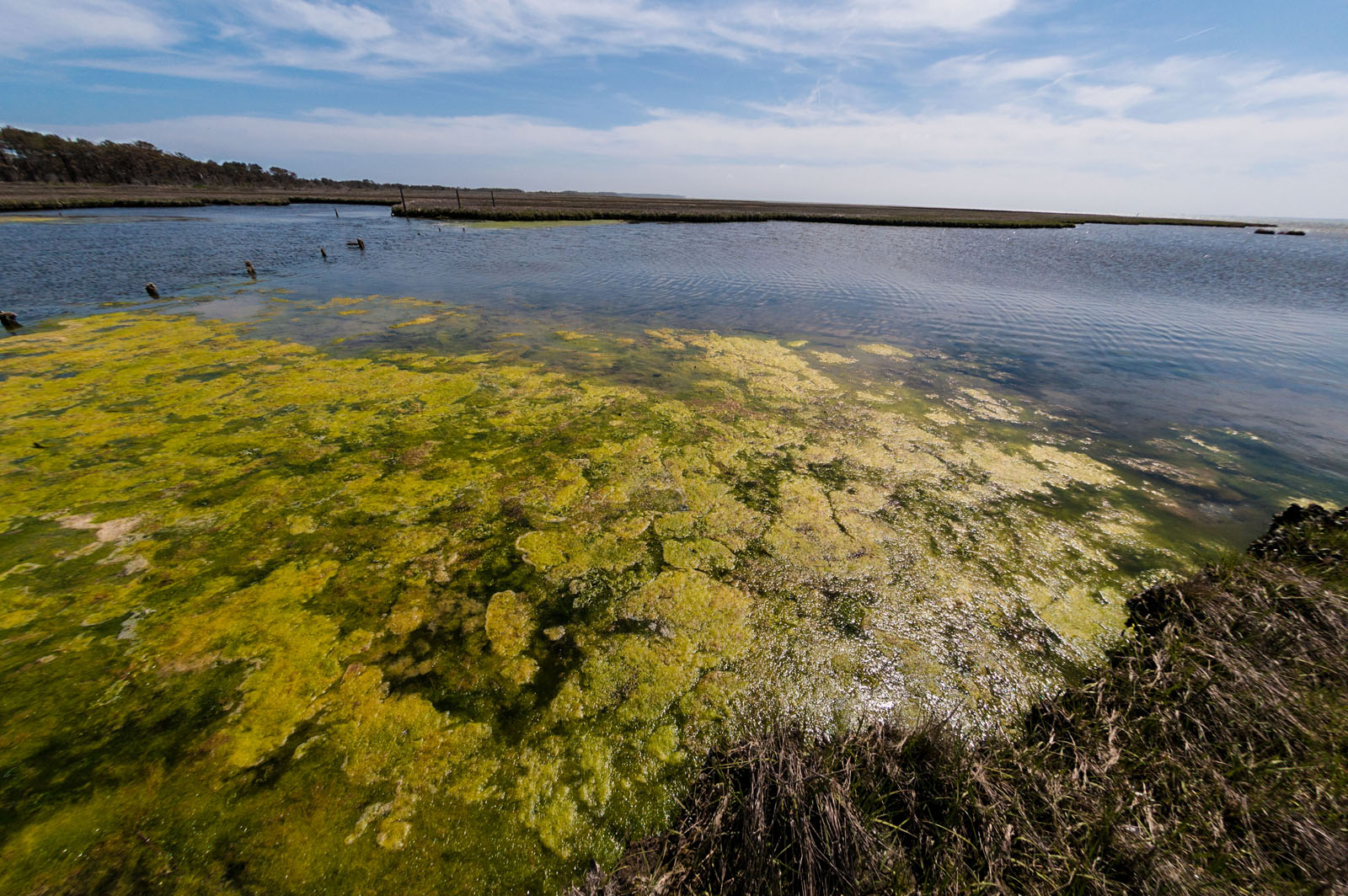
Nutrition (Eutrophic) Pollution in Assateague Island National Seashore, Maryland

Intertidal zones are sensitive habitats with an abundance of marine species that can experience ecological hazards associated with tourism and human-induced environmental impacts. A variety of other threats that have been summarized by scientists include nutrient pollution, overharvesting, habitat destruction, and climate change. Habitat destruction is advanced through activities including harvesting fisheries with drag nets and a neglect of the sensitivity of intertidal zones.

== Gallery ==
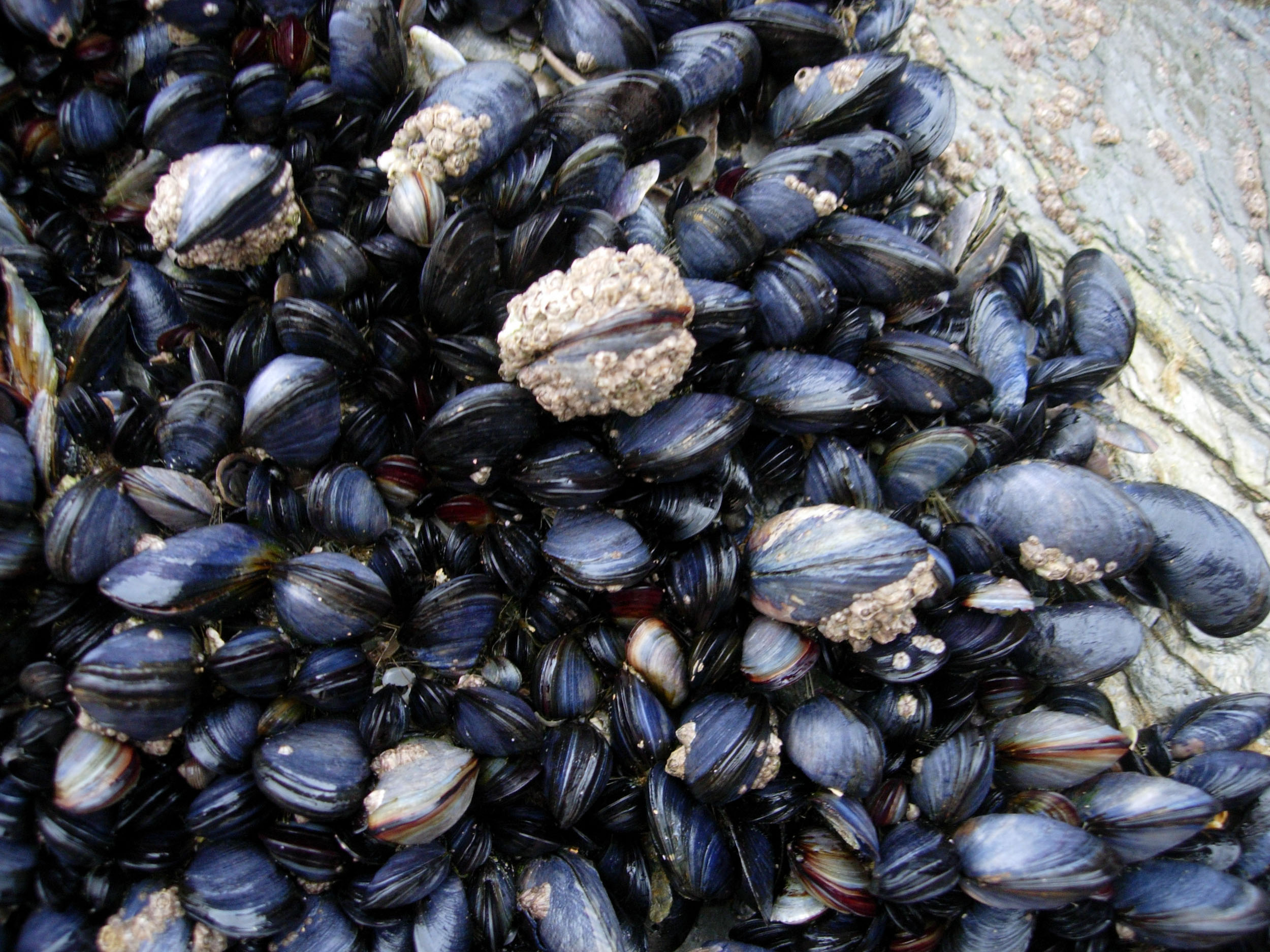
Mussels in the intertidal zone in Cornwall, England

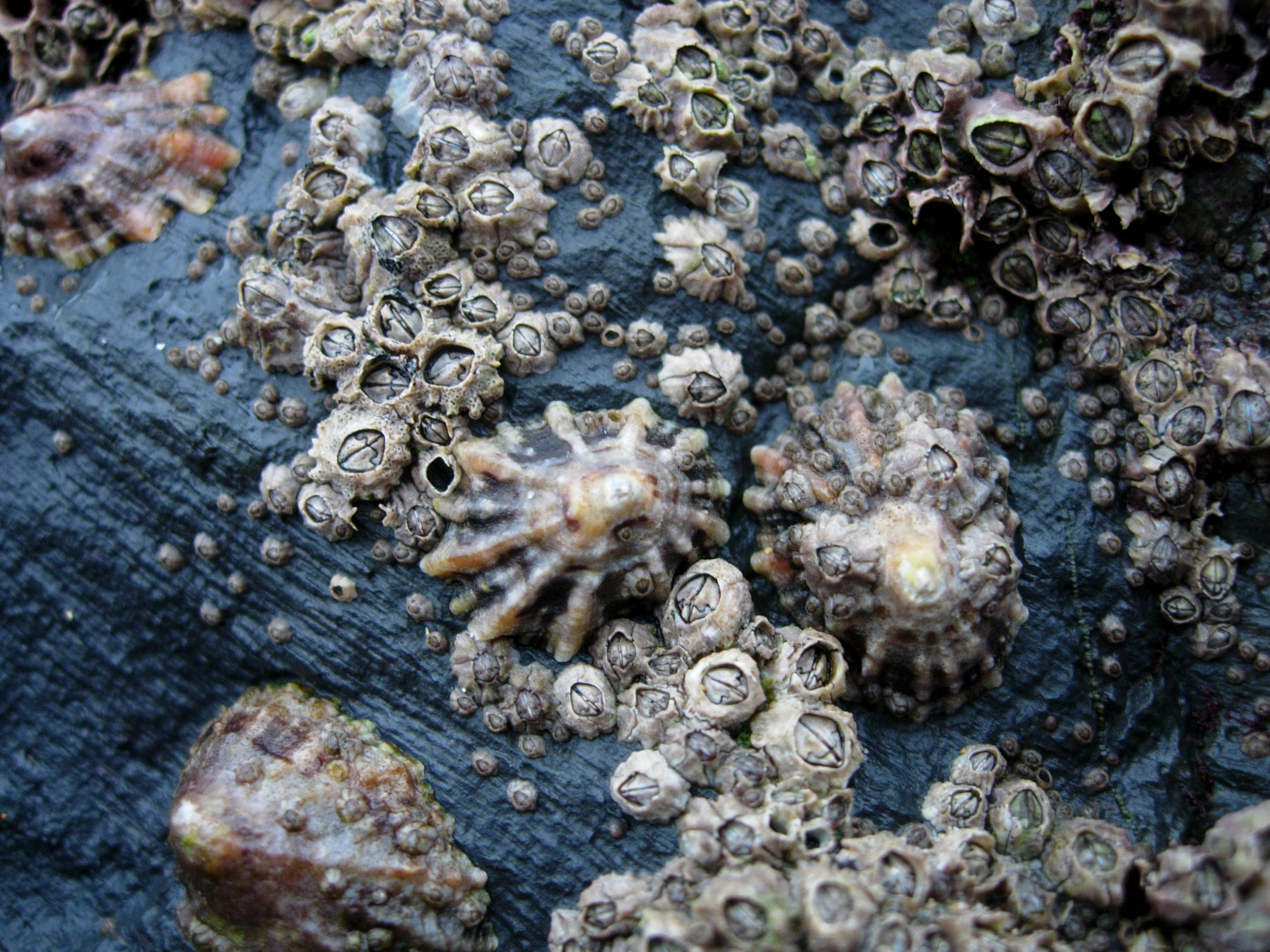
Barnacles and limpets in the intertidal zone near Newquay, Cornwall, England

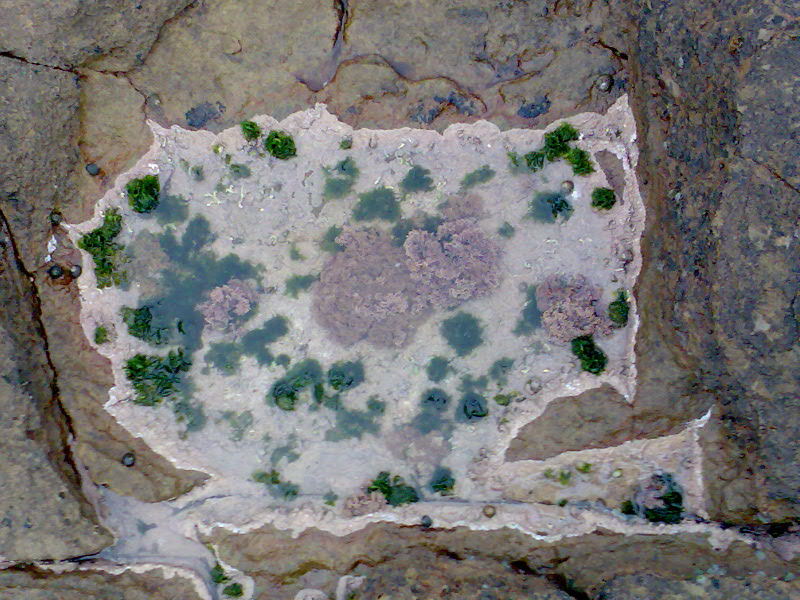
A tidal pool in the intertidal zone during low tide, Sunrise-on-Sea, South Africa

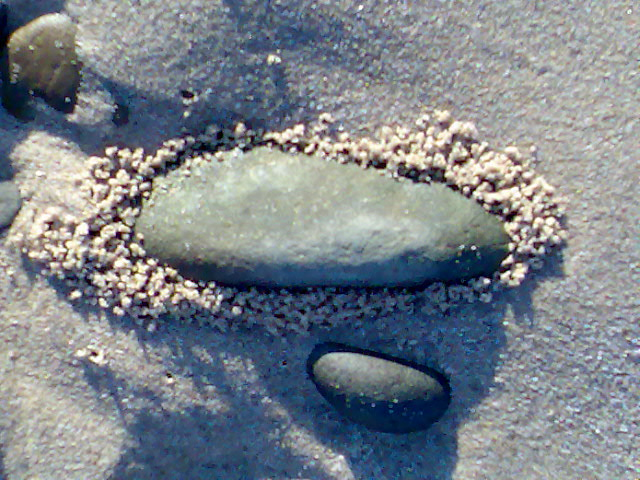
Unexplained crumbs of sand that appear to have been deposited around stone by escaping air

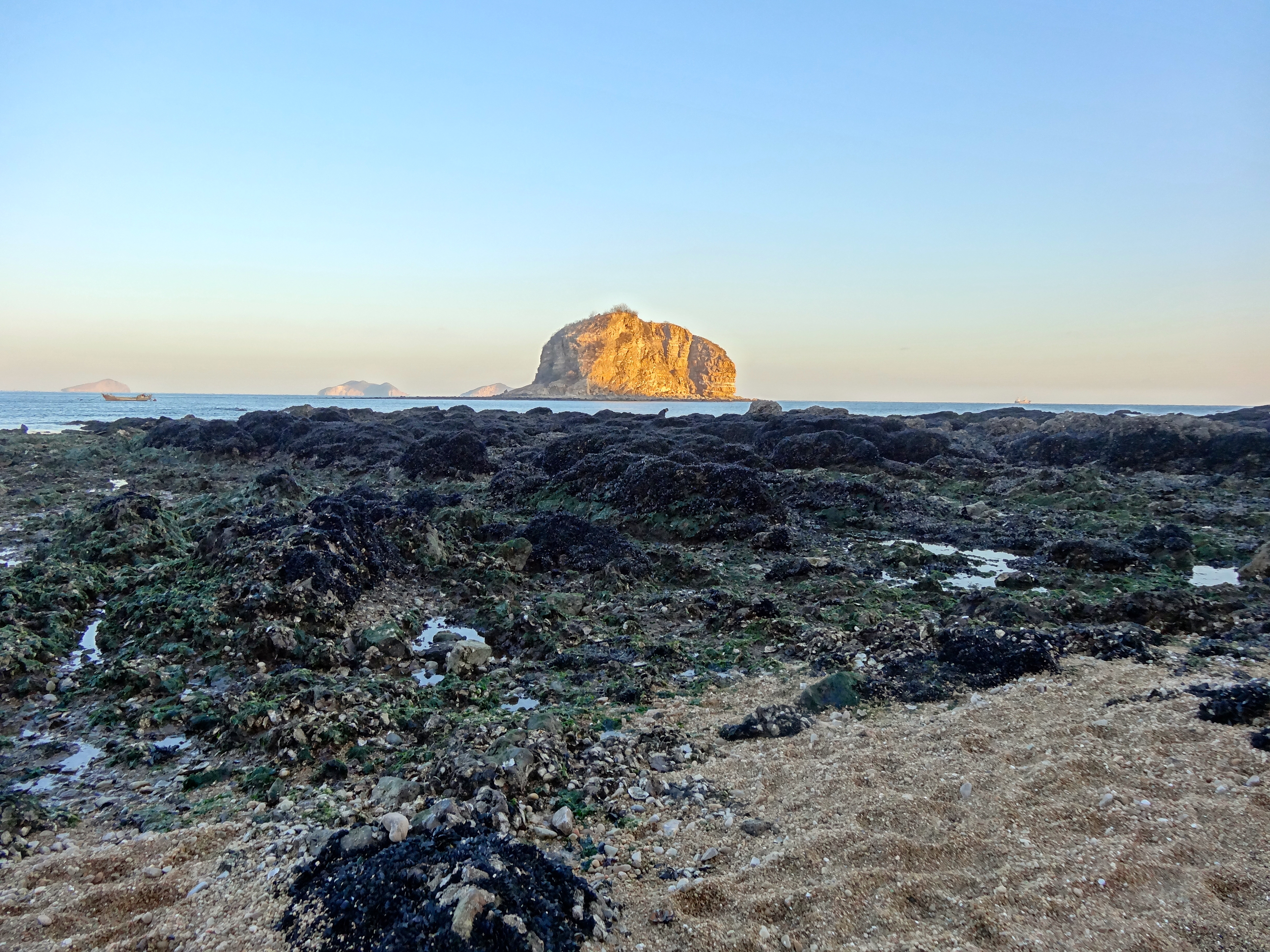
Rocks in intertidal zone completely covered by mussels, at Bangchuidao Scenic Area, Dalian, Liaoning Province, China

== See also ==
- Ballantine Scale
- Ecological forecasting
- Littoral series
- NaGISA
- Shorezone
- Tidelands
