= Mitchell Sogin =

American microbiologist

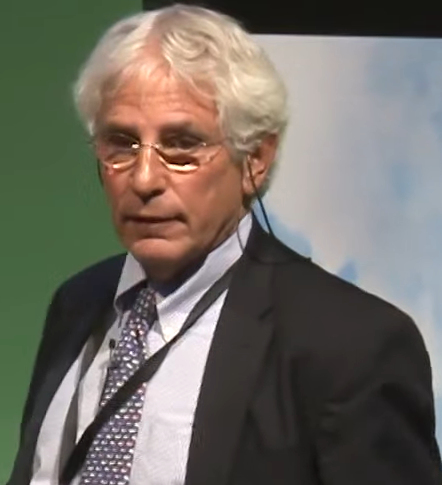
Sogin in 2019

Mitchell Sogin is an American microbiologist. He is a distinguished senior scientist at the Marine Biological Laboratory in Woods Hole, Massachusetts. His research investigates the evolution, diversity, and distribution of single-celled organisms.

== Early life and education ==
Sogin grew up in Chicago and went to the University of Illinois on a swimming scholarship, intending to become a doctor. Instead he continued on at the university to complete a MS in Industrial Microbiology under Z. John Ordal in 1967 and a PhD in Microbiology and Molecular Biology under Carl R. Woese in 1972.

== Career ==
Sogin obtained a BS in Chemistry and Microbiology at the University of Illinois, Urbana in 1967. He went on to join the staff at National Jewish Health, Denver, Colorado where he was an NIH Postdoctoral Fellow in the lab of Norman R. Pace from 1972-1976 and then a senior staff member from 1976-1989. Sogin became a professor at the University of Colorado Health Sciences Center in 1980 and in 1989 joined the Marine Biological Laboratory at Woods Hole as a senior scientist. He founded the Josephine Bay Paul Center for Comparative Molecular Biology and Evolution at the Marine Biological Laboratory in 1997, and served as its director until 2013. Sogin has a professor appointment in the department of Molecular Biology, Cell Biology, and Biochemistry at Brown University. He is a fellow of the American Association for the Advancement of Science, the American Academy of Arts and Sciences and the American Academy of Microbiology and was a Miller Professor at the University of California at Berkeley. He received the Stoll Stunkard Award from the American Society of Parasitologists and the Roger Porter Award from the American Society for Microbiology. Sogin serves as co-chair of the Scientific Steering Committee for the Deep Life Community of the Deep Carbon Observatory.

== Research initiatives ==
Sogin’s molecular phylogeny from ribosomal RNA sequences provided a framework for reconstructing the evolution of microbial eukaryotes. He documented early diverging eukaryotic lineages, giving the earliest evidence of a link between animals and fungi, to the exclusion of all other eukaryotes. His work demonstrated that the AIDS-related pathogen Pneumocystis shares a recent common ancestor with fungi instead of with the parasitic protozoa that cause malaria. He also discovered the “rare biosphere” which represents most of Earth’s microbial diversity. Sogin was the first to use PCR to amplify and sequence ribosomal RNA genes and to use next generation DNA sequencing to characterize complex microbial communities, which now dominates the field of molecular microbial ecology, including efforts underway within the Human Microbiome Project. He has contributed to analytical strategies to determine the taxonomic identity of marker gene surveys and with David Mark Welch of the Josephine Bay Paul Center has established the Visualization of Microbial Population Structures (VAMPS) website, which offers tools for comparing microbial community populations. As part of the Census of Marine Life, Sogin formed and led the International Census of Marine Microbes. His group currently collaborates on studies of human microbiome dynamics with Eugene Chang of the University of Chicago. They study pouchitis, a model for ulcerative colitis. Sogin also serves on the editorial boards of the Journal of Eukaryotic Microbiology (formerly Journal of Protozoology), Molecular Phylogenetics and Evolution, Protist (formerly Archiv für Protistenkunde), Applied and Environmental Microbiology, and Environmental Microbiology.
