= Ann Bucklin =

Marine scientist

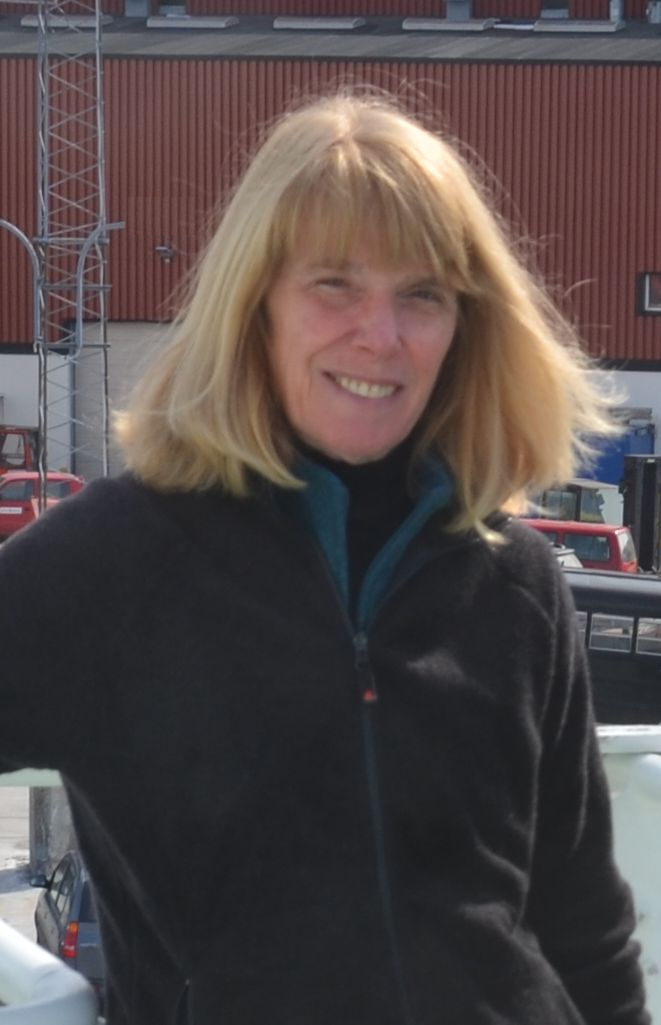
- Ann Bucklin on the Norwegian R/V GO Sars in 2013
- Education: University of California, Berkeley
- Scientific career
- Workplaces: University of Connecticut
- Thesis: The reproduction and population biology of Metridium (Coelenterata, Actiniaria) (1980)

Ann Bucklin is Professor Emeritus of Marine Sciences at the University of Connecticut known for her work using molecular tools to study zooplankton. Bucklin was elected a fellow of the American Association for the Advancement of Science in 1995.

== Education and career ==
Bucklin has an A.B. in biology from Oberlin College and earned her Ph.D. from the University of California, Berkeley in 1980. Following her Ph.D., she was a NATO postdoctoral fellow at the Marine Biological Association of the United Kingdom and a postdoctoral scholar at Woods Hole Oceanographic Institution from 1980 until 1983. Bucklin worked at the University of New Hampshire, first as a research professor and then as professor starting in 1998. She served as director of the New Hampshire Sea Grant Program from 1992 until 2005 when she moved to the University of Connecticut in Groton, CT where she was the head of the Department of Marine Sciences until 2014. From 2004 until 2010, Bucklin was the lead scientist for the Census of Marine Zooplankton, a field project connected to the Census of Marine Life project. During 2014-2017, she served as chair of the Working Group on Integrative Morphological and Molecular Taxonomy (WGIMT) of the International Council for the Exploration of the Sea (ICES). From 2019 to 2024, Bucklin served as chair of the MetaZooGene working group (WG157) within the Scientific Committee on Oceanic Research (SCOR). In August 2023, Bucklin was appointed U.S. Academic Delegate to ICES https://www.ices.dk and now serves as one of two U.S. representatives on the ICES Council, the decision and policy-making body in ICES, and helps encourage and coordinate ICES-related research and activities in the U.S. academic community.

== Research ==
Bucklin is known for her research using molecular tools to characterize the ecology and evolution of marine organisms. Starting with her graduate research on the sea anemone, Metridium senile, Bucklin worked on patterns of reproduction and genetic differentiation of species. She has used genetics to track a variety of marine species including tube worms from hydrothermal vents, amphipods, euphausiids, and copepods. Through her research, she has used molecular protocols to differentiate and identify closely related and cryptic species of copepods and euphausiids, examine patterns of population genetic variation and structure, and describe evolutionary relationships of selected zooplankton species and groups. Bucklin uses DNA barcoding to discriminate and identify species of marine zooplankton, and the resulting data has implications for ocean health. She uses DNA metabarcoding to analyze patterns of biodiversity of marine zooplankton based on environmental samples, including time-series collections during ecosystem monitoring programs.

=== Selected publications ===
- Bucklin, A.; Frost, B. W.; Kocher, T. D. (1995-02-01). "Molecular systematics of six Calanus and three Metridia species (Calanoida: Copepoda)". Marine Biology. 121 (4): 655–664. doi:10.1007/BF00349301. ISSN 1432-1793. S2CID 86029812.
- Bucklin, A.; Frost, B.; Bradford-Grieve, J.; Allen, L.; Copley, N. (2003). "Molecular systematic and phylogenetic assessment of 34 calanoid copepod species of the Calanidae and Clausocalanidae". Marine Biology. 142 (2): 333–343. doi:10.1007/s00227-002-0943-1. ISSN 0025-3162. S2CID 86514279.
- Bucklin, Ann; Steinke, Dirk; Blanco-Bercial, Leocadio (2011-01-15). "DNA Barcoding of Marine Metazoa". Annual Review of Marine Science. 3 (1): 471–508. Bibcode:2011ARMS....3..471B. doi:10.1146/annurev-marine-120308-080950. ISSN 1941-1405. PMID 21329214.
- Bucklin, A., P.K. Lindeque, N. Rodriguez-Ezpeleta, A. Albaina, and M. Lehtiniemi (2016) Metabarcoding of marine zooplankton: Progress, prospects and pitfalls. J. Plankton Res. 38: 393-400. https://doi.org/10.1093/plankt/fbw023
- Bucklin, A., K. DiVito, I. Smolina, M. Choquet, J.M. Questel, G. Hoarau and R.J. O’Neill (2018) Population genomics of marine zooplankton. In: Population Genomics: Marine Organisms, O.P. Rajora and M. Oleksiak (Eds.), Springer. pp. 61–102. https://doi.org/10.1007/13836_2017_9
- Bucklin, A., K.T.C.A. Peijnenburg, K.N. Kosobokova, T.D. O’Brien, L. Blanco-Bercial, A. Cornils, T. Falkenhaug, R.R. Hopcroft, A. Hosia, S. Laakmann, C. Li, L. Martell, J.M. Questel, D. Wall-Palmer, M. Wang, P.H. Wiebe, A. Weydmann-Zwolicka (2021) Toward a global reference database of COI barcodes for marine zooplankton. Marine Biology 168 (78). https://doi.org/10.1007/s00227-021-03887-y
- Bucklin, A., K.T.C.A. Peijnenburg, K.N. Kosobokova, and R. Machida (2021) New insights into biodiversity, biogeography, ecology, and evolution of marine zooplankton based on molecular approaches. ICES Journal of Marine Science, https://doi.org/10.1093/icesjms/fsab198
- Bucklin, A., P.G. Batta-Lona, J.M. Questel, P.H. Wiebe, D.E. Richardson, N.J. Copley and T.D. O’Brien (2022) COI metabarcoding of zooplankton species diversity for time-series monitoring of the NW Atlantic continental shelf. Front. Mar. Sci. 9:867893. https://doi.org/10.3389/fmars.2022.867893
- Bucklin, A., J.M. Questel, P.G. Batta-Lona, M. Reid, P.H. Wiebe, R.G. Campbell and C.J. Ashjian (2023) Population genetic diversity and structure of the euphausiids Thysanoessa inermis and T. raschii in the Arctic Ocean: Inferences from COI barcodes. Marine Biodiversity 53:70. https://doi.org/10.1007/s12526-023-01371-y
- Blanco-Bercial, L., J. M. Questel, P. G. Batta-Lona, et al. 2026. “ MetaZooGene Intercalibration Experiment (MZG-ICE): Metabarcoding Marine Zooplankton Diversity of the Global Ocean.” Molecular Ecology Resources 26, no. 1: e70090. https://doi.org/10.1111/1755-0998.70090.

== Awards and honors ==
- Oberlin College Aeolian Fellowship (1980)
- Fulbright Senior Fellowship, Institute of Marine Research, Bergen, Norway (1993-1994)
- Fellow, American Association for the Advancement of Science (1995)
- Member, Connecticut Academy of Science and Engineering (2006)
- International Council for the Exploration of the Sea (ICES) Outstanding Achievement Award (2019)
- University of Connecticut Faculty Excellence in Research and Creativity-Sciences Award (2020)
