= GeoEcoMar =

Romanian institute of marine geology and geoecology

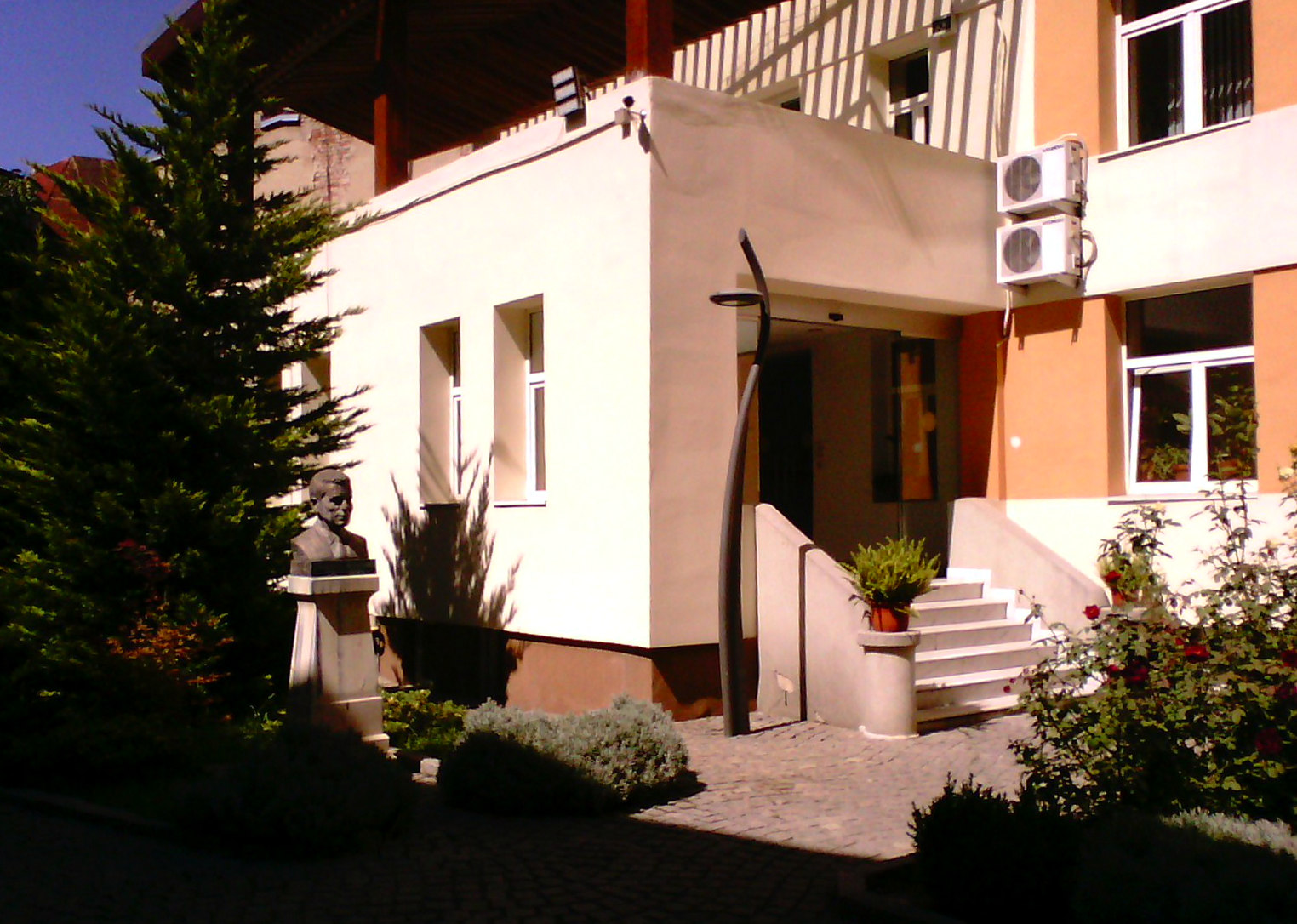
The building of GeoEcoMar at Bucharest, Romania

The National Institute for Research and Development of Marine Geology and Geoecology – GeoEcoMar (Romanian: Institutul Național de Cercetare - Dezvoltare pentru Geologie și Geoecologie Marină - GeoEcoMar) is a Romanian institute of geology and geo-ecology founded in 1993. It was initially named Romanian Centre for Marine Geology and Geo-ecology. Its administrative and scientific headquarters is in the capital of Romania, Bucharest; but the operational center, with the research vessels and marine infrastructure, is in Constanța, an important harbor on the Black Sea. The first director of the institute was the academician Nicolae Panin, now retired and a personal adviser of the current director, Gheorghe Oaie.

== Programs and partners ==
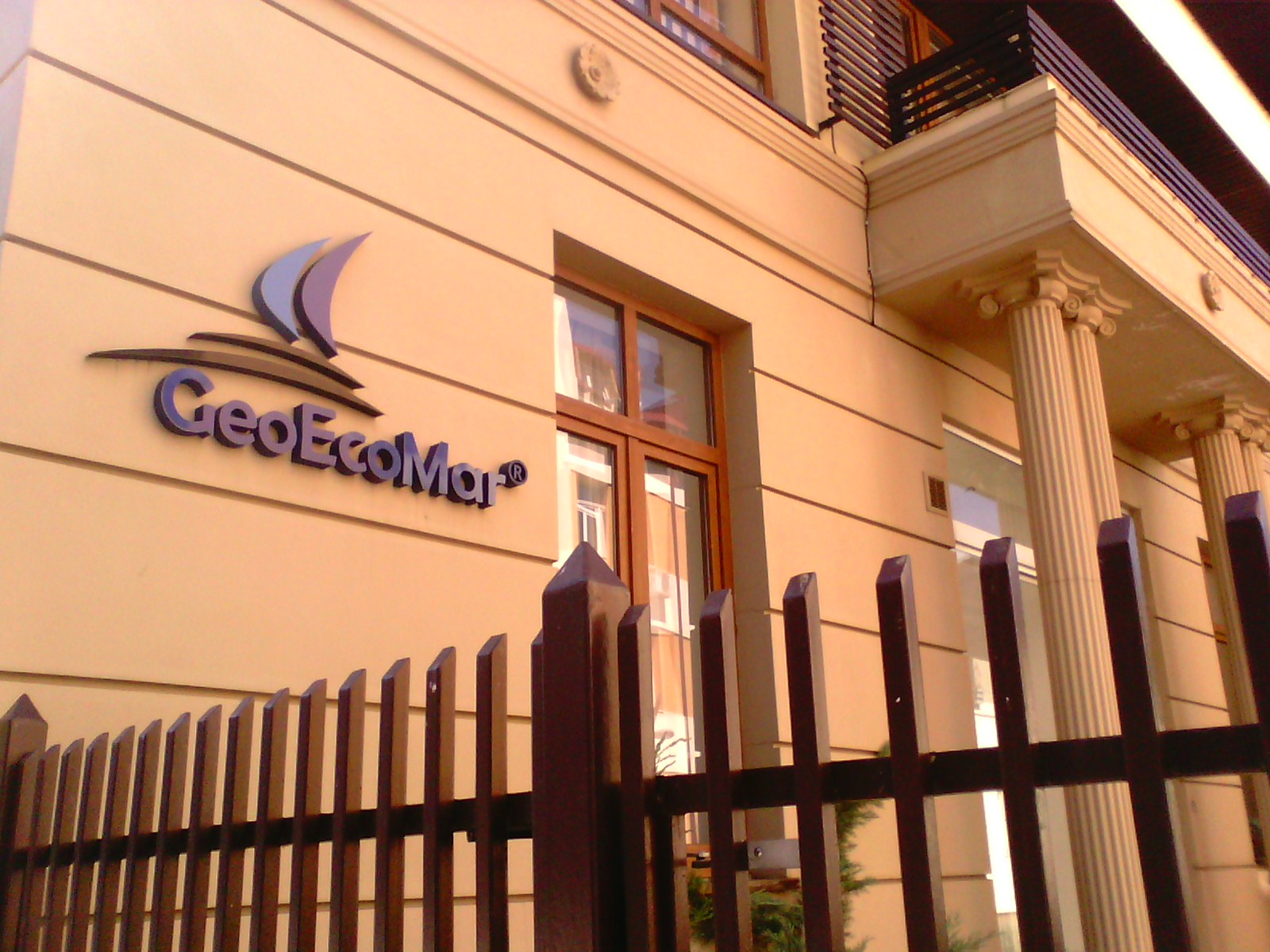
Acronym of GeoEcoMar at a building

GeoEcoMar is involved in European research programs of hydrological river-delta-sea macro-systems. It has fathomed the study of coastal erosion and its correction and participates in European programs to monitor potential hazards in the Black Sea. It explores the environmental effects of a dramatic decline due to the sediments collected by the upstream dams. Also, the Institute is involved in carbon dioxide capture and storage.

Since 1996, GeoEcoMar has been formally authorized to develop impact studies and environmental evaluations in Romania. Since 2006 it has been certified ISO 9001 for research conducted in geology, geophysics and geo-ecology, and by Lloyd's Register Quality Assurance (Romania) in accordance with ISO 9001: 2008 and ISO 9001: 2008. The Institute obtained the European status of excellence (Euro-EcoGeoCentre Romania).

GeoEcoMar is, alongside similar institutes from Italy, France, UK, Greece, Spain, Ireland, the Netherlands, Germany and Portugal, a member of the European Multidisciplinary Seafloor and water column Observatory (EMSO), a network of various institutes and companies monitoring the open ocean or shallow waters in order to prevent hazards, tsunami or earthquake effects. It has initiated Évolution du littoral danubien: vulnérabilité et prévention project which is to collect seismic data from the mouth of the river Danube, to study the morpho-sedimentary structure of the river-sea system.

== Fleet ==
The Institute’s investigations are undertaken with the help of the largest research vessel in the Black Sea: Mare Nigrum, an interdisciplinary research vessel which is 82 m long and has a displacement capacity of 3200 tonnes; and also Istros, which has a length of 32m and a displacement of 125 tonnes; and Halmyris, a laboratory boat bridge of 32 meters long and a displacement capacity of 90 tonnes.
