= Arctic Ocean Diversity =

Field project of the Census of Marine Life project

- Abbreviation: ArcOD
- Purpose: Oceanography research

Arctic Ocean Diversity is one of the 14 field projects of the Census of Marine Life project. The Arctic Ocean Diversity (ArcOD) project is an international effort to inventory the diversity of marine life in the three major Arctic realms: sea ice, water column, and sea floor – from the shallow shelves to the deep basins.

== ArcOD's Main Scientific Questions ==
- How many species are there in the three realms sea ice, water column, and benthos and what are their patterns in distribution, abundance and biomass?
- What are the biota’s bio-geographic affinities (Arctic, Atlantic, Pacific, cosmopolitan) and distribution barriers? Do they vary between realms or between shelves versus deep-sea?
- Can we distinguish regional differences within and between species using traditional tools combined with molecular tools?
- What are the relationships between species distribution patterns and richness with environmental factors, in particular different water masses, primary productivity patterns, sea ice regimes and substrate types?

The framework and urgency for these questions is the ongoing dramatic climate change in the Arctic that is already linked to changes in biological communities. Substantial gaps in the Arctic’s biodiversity inventory hamper the ability to fully detect the magnitude and extent of these changes. ArcOD’s approach has been to compile data on the known, improve taxonomic resolution of already collected materials and begin to fill geographic and taxonomic gaps with new collections. This work has been done across biological realms and on a pan-Arctic scale. The most substantial limit to the current knowledge is the temporal variability of biodiversity patterns in the Arctic, in particular vulnerability of Arctic biota to climate change and the increasing human footprint in the area.

== Expeditions ==
- 15 August to 8 september 2002: Arctic Exploration cruise
- 23 July 2003 to September 6 2004 The first RUSALCA (Russian-American Long-term census of the Arctic) expedition focused on the Bering and Chukcha seas, an area considered particularly sensitive to global climate change, between .
- 23 June to 26 July 2005: The Hidden Ocean - Arctic 2005 cruise
- March to May/June 2008 and 2009: Bering Sea Ecosystem study cruises.
- RUSALCA 2009: The second expedition included replacement of eight buoys across the Bering strait. Data from these buoys has shown changes in temperature and salinity of the water flowing into the Arctic Ocean from the Pacific, which may be contributing towards the reduction in sea ice. The second phase was to investigate methane flux from thawing sub-sea permafrost and other changes in the benthic and mid-water ecosystems.

The RUSALCA expeditions are reported to have achieved more than the participants could have done alone.
