= History of Marine Animal Populations =

The History of Marine Animal Populations (HMAP) is an international, interdisciplinary research initiative. It comprises the historical component of the Census of Marine Life and is designed to measure and explain patterns of long-term change in the diversity, distribution and abundance of life in the oceans.

== Aim ==
The overarching aim of the HMAP project is to improve knowledge and understanding of the interaction of humankind with the marine environment since the earliest times. Attaining this goal will yield information on long-term changes in stock abundance, the historic ecological impact of large-scale human harvesting and the role of marine resource utilization in the development of human societies. Such evidence, in turn, will broaden and deepen knowledge of the contemporary condition of the marine environment and provide the time series and ecological insight required to assess the future sustainability of marine animal populations.

== Activities ==
HMAP engages in three principal types of activity:
Discipline building
To further the twin sub-disciplines of marine environmental history and historical ecology, HMAP organises graduate summer schools, conferences and workshops; the HMAP approach is firmly embedded in the teaching and research effort of several universities around the globe: Roskilde University and Technical University of Denmark, University of Hull and Cambridge University, UK, University of New Hampshire and University of Connecticut, USA, Trinity College Dublin, Ireland, Murdoch University, Australia, Simon Bolivar University, Caracas, Venezuela, University of Haifa, Israel, and European University of St Petersburg, Russia.

Research
To enhance knowledge and understanding of ecosystem dynamics, HMAP sponsors teams of historians, archaeologists, marine ecologists, biologists and fisheries scientists to analyse historical and environmental data relating to the exploitation by humans of marine animal populations over the last 2,000 years. This research effort is currently focused on the following regional and thematic case studies (c = research completed):

South West African Shelf (lead: University of Cape Town) c
South East Australian Shelf and Slope (CSIRO, Tasmania) c
South West Pacific (NIWA, Wellington, NZ)
Indonesian Shark Fishery (Murdoch, Western Australia)
Filipino Whale Fishery (Manila, Philippines)
Taiwanese Tuna Fishery (Murdoch, Western Australia)
Caribbean Sea (Scripps Institution, San Diego)
Newfoundland & Grand Banks (University of Hull) c
Gulf of Maine Cod Fishery (University of New Hampshire)
White and Barents Seas (European University at St Petersburg)
Baltic Sea (Estonian Marine Institute/DIFRES, Copenhagen)
North Sea (medieval) (University of York)
North Sea (modern) (University of Hull, Roskilde University)
Mediterranean and Black Sea (Universities of Haifa & Southern Denmark)
World Whaling (University of New Hampshire)
Mega Molluscs (Simon Bolivar University, Venezuela)
History of Nearshore (Roskilde University & Suffolk University, MA)

Outreach and legacy
To maximize public dissemination and secure the legacies of the project, HMAP is currently focusing on regional policy briefings and web products while ensuring the publication of research syntheses.

== An interdisciplinary approach ==
The structure and vision of HMAP highlights the power of an interdisciplinary approach to understanding the long-term development of life in the ocean. Historical research reveals what we can know about the history of ocean exploitation and changing coastal communities. Ecological and historical analysis offers insight into the changes in human and natural systems over historical time. It also reveals what we do not yet know and, in some cases, cannot know about these changes. Only the interdisciplinary combination of expertise can fully develop the scope of what is known, unknown and unknowable about the environmental history of the oceans.

== Results ==
The findings of the HMAP research effort are disseminated in the following forms:
Research Datasets: the HMAP Data Pages (at Hull University) is an open access facility that currently holds approximately 750,000 records drawn from historical archives relating to the case studies listed above.

== Books ==
- Oceans Past: Management Insights from the History of Marine Animal Populations, edited by David J. Starkey, P. Holm & Michaela Barnard (London, 2007)
- Fisheries Research, HMAP Special Issue, edited by B.R. MacKenzie & H. Ojaveer (2007)
- Early Human Impact on Megamolluscs, edited by Andrzej Antczak and Roberto Cipriani (Archaeopress, Publishers on British Archaeological Reports, 2008)
- Il Mare Com’era, The English title: Human-environment interactions in the Mediterranean Sea since the Roman period until the 19th century: an historical and ecological perspective on fishing activities, (eds.), R. Gertwagen, S. Raicevich, T. Fortibuoni, O. Giovanardi, (Chioggia, 2008)
- Dutch Herring, An Environmental History, c. 1600-1860, Bo Poulsen (Amsterdam, 2008)
- An Environmental History of North Sea Ling and Cod Fisheries, 1840-1914, René Taudal Poulsen (Fisheries and Maritime Museum, Esbjerg, 2007)
- The Exploited Seas: New Directions in Marine Environmental History, edited by P. Holm, T.D. Smith & David J Starkey (St John's, Nfld, 2001)
- Shifting Baselines in the Sea: Using the Past to Inform the Present, edited by J.B.C. Jackson, E.S. Sala (University of California Press, in review)

== Further reading and external links ==
- HMAP website
- Census of Marine Life website
- HMAP at Hull University
- Web article--includes interviews with project researchers WhyFiles.org
