= Census of Diversity of Abyssal Marine Life =

Field project of the Census of Marine Life

- Abbreviation: CeDAMar
- Formation: 2003
- Type: Biological census
- Headquarters: Naturmuseum Senckenberg
- Region served: Abyssal plain
- Leader: Dr. Pedro Martinez Arbizu; Dr. Craig Smith
- Parent organization: Census of Marine Life
- Website: www.cedamar.org

The Census of Diversity of Abyssal Marine Life (CeDAMar) is a field project of the Census of Marine Life that studies the species diversity of one of the largest and most inaccessible environments on the planet, the abyssal plain. CeDAMar uses data to create an estimation of global species diversity and provide a better understanding of the history of deep-sea fauna, including its present diversity and dependence on environmental parameters. CeDAMar initiatives aim to identify centers of high biodiversity useful for planning both commercial and conservation efforts, and are able to be used in future studies on the effects of climate change on the deep sea.

As of May 2009, participation by upwards of 56 institutions in 17 countries has resulted in the publication of nearly 300 papers. Results of CeDAMar-related research were also published in a 2010 textbook on deep-sea biodiversity by Michael Rex and Ron Etter, members of CeDAMar's Scientific Steering Committee.(ISBN 978-0674036079)

CeDAMar is led by Dr. Pedro Martinez Arbizu of Germany and Dr. Craig Smith, USA.
