= Census of Marine Zooplankton =

Field project of the Census of Marine Life

- Abbreviation: CeDAMar
- Formation: 2004
- Type: Biological census
- Headquarters: University of Connecticut
- Parent organization: Census of Marine Life
- Website: www.cmarz.org

The Census of Marine Zooplankton is a field project of the Census of Marine Life that has aimed to produce a global assessment of the species diversity, biomass, biogeographic distribution, and genetic diversity of more than 7,000 described species of zooplankton that drift the ocean currents throughout their lives. CMarZ focuses on the deep sea, under-sampled regions, and biodiversity hotspots. From 2004 until 2011, Ann Bucklin was the lead scientist for the project.

Technology plays a great role in CMarZ's research, including the use of integrated morphological and molecular sampling through DNA Barcoding. CMarZ makes its datasets available via the CMarZ Database.
