= International Census of Marine Microbes =

Field project of the Census of Marine Life

- Abbreviation: ICoMM
- Established: 2004
- Headquarters: The Marine Biological Laboratory at Woods Hole
- Parent organization: Census of Marine Life
- Website: International Census of Marine Microbes

The International Census of Marine Microbes is a field project of the Census of Marine Life that inventories microbial diversity by cataloging all known diversity of single-cell organisms including bacteria, Archaea, Protista, and associated viruses, exploring and discovering unknown microbial diversity, and placing that knowledge into ecological and evolutionary contexts.

The ICoMM program, led by Mitchell Sogin, has discovered that marine microbial diversity is some 10 to 100 times greater than expected, and the vast majority are previously unknown, low abundance organisms thought to play an important role in the oceans.
