= Global Census of Marine Life on Seamounts =

Global scientific initiative

Global Census of Marine Life on Seamounts (commonly CenSeam) is a global scientific initiative, launched in 2005, that is designed to expand the knowledge base of marine life at seamounts. Seamounts are underwater mountains, not necessarily volcanic in origin, which often form subsurface archipelagoes and are found throughout the world's ocean basins, with almost half in the Pacific. There are estimated to be as many as 100,000 seamounts at least one kilometer in height, and more if lower rises are included. However, they have not been explored very much—in fact, only about half of one percent have been sampled—and almost every expedition to a seamount discovers new species and new information. There is evidence that seamounts can host concentrations of biologic diversity, each with its own unique local ecosystem; they seem to affect oceanic currents, resulting among other things in local concentration of plankton which in turn attracts species that graze on it, and indeed are probably a significant overall factor in biogeography of the oceans. They also may serve as way stations in the migration of whales and other pelagic species. Despite being poorly studied, they are heavily targeted by commercial fishing, including dredging. In addition they are of interest to potential seabed mining.

The overall goal of CenSeam is "to determine the role of seamounts in the biogeography, biodiversity, productivity, and evolution of marine organisms, and to evaluate the effects of human exploitation on seamounts." To this effect, the group organizes and contributes to various research efforts about seamount biodiversity. Specifically, the project aims to act as a standardized scaffold for future studies and samplings, citing inefficiency and incompatibility between individual research efforts in the past. To give a scale of their mission, there are an estimated 100,000 seamounts in the ocean, but only 350 of them have been sampled, and only about 100 sampled thoroughly. Although sampling all 100,000 seamounts is infeasible, major seamounts can be sampled in such a way.

CenSeam is a subdivision of the Census of Marine Life program. Organisationally, the components of CenSeam consist of a secretariat (Malcolm Clark, Mireille Consalvey, Ashley Rowden and Karen Stocks) which is hosted by the National Institute of Water and Atmospheric Research in Wellington, New Zealand; an international steering committee; a taxonomic advisory panel; and two working groups, Data Analysis and Standardisation.

In 2008 CenSeam began collaborating with the International Seabed Authority to study effects of seabed mining on seamount ecosystems.

== See also ==
- Seamount § Conservation
- Bowie Seamount
- Davidson Seamount
- Monterey Bay Aquarium Research Institute
