= Biogeography of Deep-Water Chemosynthetic Ecosystems =

Project to determine the biogeography and understand the processes driving these systems

Biogeography of Deep-Water Chemosynthetic Ecosystems (ChEss)
- Abbreviation: ChEss
- Formation: 2000
- Purpose: Oceanography research
- Key people: Paul Tyler, Chris German, Maria Baker, Eva Ramirez-Llodra
- Website: noc.soton.ac.uk/chess/index.php

The Biogeography of Deep-Water Chemosynthetic Ecosystems is a field project of the Census of Marine Life programme (CoML). The main aim of ChEss is to determine the biogeography of deep-water chemosynthetic ecosystems at a global scale and to understand the processes driving these ecosystems. ChEss addresses the main questions of CoML on diversity, abundance and distribution of marine species, focusing on deep-water reducing environments such as hydrothermal vents, cold seeps, whale falls, sunken wood and areas of low oxygen that intersect with continental margins and seamounts.

== Background ==
Deep-sea hydrothermal vents and their associated fauna were first discovered along the Galapagos Rift in the eastern Pacific in 1977. Vents are now known to occur along all active mid ocean ridges and back-arc spreading centres, from fast to ultra-slow spreading ridges. The interest in chemosynthetic environments was strengthened by the discovery of chemosynthetic-based fauna at cold seeps along the base of the Florida Escarpment in 1983. Cold seeps occur along active and passive continental margins. More recently, the study of chemosynthetic fauna has extended to the communities that develop in other reducing habitats such as whale falls, sunken wood and areas of oxygen minima when they intersect with the margin or seamounts. Since the first discovery of hydrothermal vents, more than 600 species have been described from vents and seeps. This is equivalent of 1 new description every 2 weeks(!). As biologists, geochemists, and physicists combine research efforts in these systems, new species will certainly be discovered. Moreover, because of the extreme conditions of the vent and seep habitat, certain species may have specific physiological adaptations with interesting results for the biochemical and medical industry.

These globally distributed, ephemeral and insular habitats that support endemic faunas offer natural laboratories for studies on dispersal, isolation and evolution. Here, hydrographic and topographic controls on biodiversity and biogeography might be much more readily resolved than in systems where climate and human activity obscure their role. In addition, hydrothermal vents have been suggested to be the habitat of the origin of life. These hypotheses are being used by ChEss researchers in collaboration with NASA to develop programmes to search for life in planets or moons of the outer space.

== Objectives of ChEss ==
Only a small fraction of the global ridge system (~65000 km) and of the vast continental margin regions have been explored and their communities described. It is the aim of ChEss to improve the knowledge on the diversity, abundance and distribution of species from vents, seeps and other reducing habitats at a global scale, understanding the abiotic and biotic processes that shape and maintain these ecosystems and their biogeography.

Main ChEss Science Questions

- I. What are the species' relationships between different habitats: vents, seeps, whale falls, sunken wood and OMZs?
- II. What is the role of deep-water circulation and geographical barriers in gene flow and biogeography?
- III. What are the factors driving patterns of biodiversity in these habitats?

Objective 1. To create a centralised database

To create a centralised database, ChEssBase, of deep-water vent, cold seep, whalefall and OMZ species. ChEssBase is a web-based database that incorporates archived and newly collected biological material. The database is geo- and bio-referenced. ChEssBase is available online and has been integrated with OBIS.

Objective 2. To develop a long-term field programme

To develop a long-term field programme to locate potential vent and seep sites and continue research on whalefalls and OMZ sites. The field programme aims to explain the main gaps in our knowledge of the diversity, abundance and distribution of chemosynthetic species globally. A limited number of target areas have been selected where specific scientific questions relevant to biogeographical issues will be answered.

The target areas have been grouped into two categories. Category I, combined areas: Area A: Equatorial Atlantic Belt region; Area B: the SE Pacific region; Area C: NZ region; Area D: the Arctic and Antarctic regions, within the International Polar Year. Category II, specific areas: 1 – The ice-covered Gakkel Ridge, 2 – the (ultra)-slow ridges of the Norwegian-Greenland Sea, 3 – the northern MAR between the Iceland and Azores hot-spots; 4 – the Brazilian continental margin, 5 – the East Scotia Ridge and Bransfield Strait, 6 – the SW Indian Ridge, 7 – the Central Indian Ridge. During the field programme, ChEss will promote the development and refinement of deep-towed, remotely operated (ROV) and autonomous underwater (AUV) vehicle technologies to locate, map and sample new chemosynthetic systems. Using optical, chemical and acoustic techniques, ChEss researchers hope to gain a better understanding of not only biogeographical patterns, but to determine the processes driving these ecosystems.

During the field programme, ChEss will promote the development and refinement of deep-towed, remotely operated (ROV) and autonomous underwater (AUV) vehicle technologies to locate, map and sample new chemosynthetic systems. Using optical, chemical and acoustic techniques, ChEss researchers hope to gain a better understanding of not only biogeographical patterns, but to determine the processes driving these ecosystems.

Objective 3: Outreach and Education

ChEss has multi-lingual education pages related to vents, seeps and whalefalls. There is a dedicated page for key outreach initiatives such as live cruise diaries, open days, school activities etc.

ChEss has joined forces with the other deep-sea CoML projects and this has resulted in the creation of the DEep-Sea Education and Outreach group (DESEO) that has produced a book "Deeper than Light" published in 5 languages.
