= Deep Sea Research =

- Discipline: Oceanography
- Language: English
- Edited by: Part I: I.G. Priede and J. Fang; Part II: Javier Arístegui, Kenneth Drinkwater, Walker Smith Jr., and Jing Zhang

Publication details
- History: 1953–present
- Publisher: Elsevier
- Frequency: Monthly
- Impact factor: Part I: 2.955; Part II: 2.732 (2020)

Standard abbreviations
- ISO 4: Deep Sea Res.

Indexing
- Deep Sea Research (1953)
- ISSN: 0146-6313
- Deep Sea Research and Oceanographic Abstracts
- ISSN: 0011-7471
- Deep Sea Research (1977)
- ISSN: 0146-6291
- Deep Sea Research Part A
- CODEN: DRPPD5
- ISSN: 0198-0149
- LCCN: 86648517
- OCLC no.: 04764804
- Deep Sea Research Part B
- ISSN: 0198-0254
- Deep Sea Research Part I
- CODEN: DRORE7
- ISSN: 0967-0637 (print); 1879-0119 (web)
- LCCN: 94646137
- OCLC no.: 27162204
- Deep Sea Research Part II
- CODEN: DSROEK
- ISSN: 0967-0645 (print); 1879-0100 (web)
- LCCN: 93645985
- OCLC no.: 27162205

Links
- Deep Sea Research (1953); Deep Sea Research and Oceanographic Abstracts; Deep Sea Research (1977); Deep Sea Research Part A; Deep Sea Research Part B; Deep Sea Research Part I; Deep Sea Research Part II

Deep Sea Research is a peer-reviewed academic journal of deep sea research. It was established in 1953 by Pergamon Press. In 1962, it renamed itself Deep Sea Research and Oceanographic Abstracts, and returned to the Deep Sea Research title in 1977. In 1978, it split into two journals Deep Sea Research Part A: Oceanographic Research Papers and Deep Sea Research Part B: Oceanographic Literature Review. In 1993, Part A split into Deep Sea Research Part I: Oceanographic Research Papers and Deep Sea Research Part II: Topical Studies in Oceanography, while Part B was discontinued.

The journal is published by Elsevier. Part I is edited by Jiasong Fang and Imants G. Priede, while Part II is edited by Javier Arístegui and Kenneth Drinkwater.

== Abstracting and indexing ==
Part I is indexed and abstracted in the following bibliographic databases:

- Academic Search Premier
- Aerospace Database
- Aquatic Sciences and Fisheries Abstracts
- BIOSIS Previews
- Civil Engineering Abstracts
- Communication Abstracts
- Compendex
- Environment Index
- GEOBASE
- Inspec
- Metadex
- PASCAL
- Science Citation Index Expanded
- Scopus

while Part II is covered by

- Academic Search Premier
- Aerospace Database
- Aquatic Sciences and Fisheries Abstracts
- Arctic and Antarctic Regions
- Civil Engineering Abstracts
- Communication Abstracts
- Compendex
- Environment Index
- GEOBASE
- Inspec
- Metadex
- PASCAL
- Science Citation Index Expanded
- Scopus

According to the Journal Citation Reports, Part I and Part II have 2020 impact factors of 2.955 and 2 2.732 430 respectively.
