= Census of Coral Reefs =

Field project of the Census of Marine Life

Census of Coral Reef Ecosystems
- Abbreviation: CReefs
- Formation: 2002
- Type: Biological census
- Headquarters: Scripps Institute of Oceanography, Australian Institute of Marine Science, NOAA
- Parent organization: Census of Marine Life
- Website: www.creefs.org

The Census of Coral Reefs (CReefs) is a field project of the Census of Marine Life that surveys the biodiversity of coral reef ecosystems internationally. The project works to study what species live in coral reef ecosystems, to develop standardized protocols for studying coral reef ecosystems, and to increase access to and exchange of information about coral reefs scattered throughout the globe.

The CReefs project uses the implementation of autonomous reef-monitoring structures (ARMS) to study the species that inhabit coral reefs. These structures are placed on the sea floor in areas where coral reefs exist, where they are left for one year. At the end of the year, the ARMvS is pulled to the surface, along with the species which have inhabited it, for analysis.

Coral reefs are thought to be the most organically different of all marine ecosystems. Major declines in key reef ecosystems suggest a decline in reef population throughout the world due to environmental stresses. The vulnerability of coral reef ecosystems is expected to increase significantly in response to climate change. The reefs are also being threatened by induced coral bleaching, ocean acidification, sea level rise, and changing storm tracks. Reef biodiversity could be in danger of being lost before it is even documented, and researchers will be left with a limited and poor understanding of these complex ecosystems.

In an attempt to enhance global understanding of reef biodiversity, the goals of the CReefs Census of Coral Reef Ecosystems were to conduct a diverse global census of coral reef ecosystems. and increase access to and exchange of coral reef data throughout the world. Because coral reefs are the most diverse and among the most threatened of all marine ecosystems, there is great justification to learn more about them.
