= Ecological forecasting =

Field of study

Ecological forecasting uses knowledge of physics, ecology and physiology, to predict how ecological populations, communities, or ecosystems will change in the future in response to environmental factors such as climate change. The goal of the approach is to provide natural resource managers with information to anticipate and respond to short and long-term climate conditions.

Changing climate conditions present ecologists with the challenge to predict where, when and with what magnitude changes are likely to occur so that we can mitigate or at least prepare for them. Ecological forecasting applies existing knowledge of ecosystem interactions to predict how changes in environmental factors might result in changes to the ecosystems as a whole.

One of the most complete sources on the topic is the book Ecological Forecasting written by Michael C. Dietze.

== Methods ==
Ecologists shifted towards Bayesian methods starting 1990, when improvements in computational power allowed the use of more demanding computational statistics such as hierarchical Bayes. This kind of analysis employs a Bayesian network that provides a probabilistic graphical model of a set of parameters, and can accommodate unobserved variables. A Bayesian structure is a probabilistic approach that is flexible for high-dimensional data and allows ecologists to separate sources of uncertainty in their models.

Forecasts can leverage Bayes' theorem and be iteratively updated with new observations using a process called data assimilation. Data assimilation combines observations on different temporal and geographic scales with forecasts, all of which combine to provide more information than any one data source alone. Some ecologists have found this framework to be useful for ecological models as they often rely on a wide range of data sources.

== Models ==
Ecological forecasting varies in spatial and temporal extent, as well as in what is being forecast (presence, abundance, diversity, production, etc.).

- Population models may be used to generate short-term abundance forecasts using knowledge of population dynamics and recent environmental conditions. These models are used especially in fisheries and disease forecasting.
- Species distribution models (SDMs) may be used to forecast species distribution (presence or abundance) over longer ecological time scales using information about past and projected environmental conditions across the landscape.
  - Correlative SDMs, also known as climate envelope models, rely on statistical correlations between existing species distributions (range boundaries) and environmental variables to outline a range (envelope) of environmental conditions within which a species can exist. New range boundaries can then be forecast using future levels of environmental factors such as temperature, rainfall, and salinity from climate model projections. These methods are good for examining large numbers of species but are likely not a good means of predicting effects at fine scales.
  - Mechanistic SDMs use information about a species' physiological tolerances and constraints, as well as models of organismal body temperature and other biophysical properties, to define the range of environmental conditions within which a species can exist. These tolerances are mapped onto current and projected environmental conditions in the landscape to outline current and forecasted ranges for the species. In contrast to "climate envelope" approaches, mechanistic SDMs model the fundamental niche directly, and are therefore much more exact. However, the approach requires more information is also usually more time-consuming.
- Other types of models may be used to forecast (or hindcast) biodiversity over evolutionary time scales. Palaeobiology modeling uses fossil and phylogenetic evidence of biodiversity in the past to project the trajectory of biodiversity in the future. Simple plots can be constructed and then adjusted based on the varying quality of the fossil record.

== Forecasting examples ==
=== Biodiversity ===
Using fossil evidence, studies have shown that vertebrate biodiversity has grown exponentially through Earth's history and that biodiversity is entwined with the diversity of Earth's habitats.

"Animals have not yet invaded 2/3 of Earth's habitats, and it could be that without human influence biodiversity will continue to increase in an exponential fashion."

— Sahney et al.

=== Temperature ===
External image
- Intertidal temperature forecasting University of South Carolina

Forecasts of temperature, shown in the diagram at the right as colored dots, along the North Island of New Zealand in the austral summer of 2007. As per the temperature scale shown at the bottom, intertidal temperatures were forecast to exceed 30 °C at some locations on February 19; surveys later showed that these sites corresponded to large die-offs in burrowing sea urchins.

=== Terrestrial carbon cycle ===
Forecasts of terrestrial carbon flux have been used to inform earth system models (ESMs). Some approaches use measurements from eddy covariance towers to predict carbon pools. In a 2015 paper, researchers found that carbon content in terrestrial ecosystems tends to converge to an equilibrium, and the rate of approach to equilibrium is intrinsically predictable.

== See also ==
- Biostatistics
- Census of Marine Life
- Climate change
- Dynamic global vegetation model
- Ecosystem model
- Global Ocean Ecosystem Dynamics
- Mathematical and theoretical biology
- NaGISA
