= Boris Worm =

Canadian marine ecologist

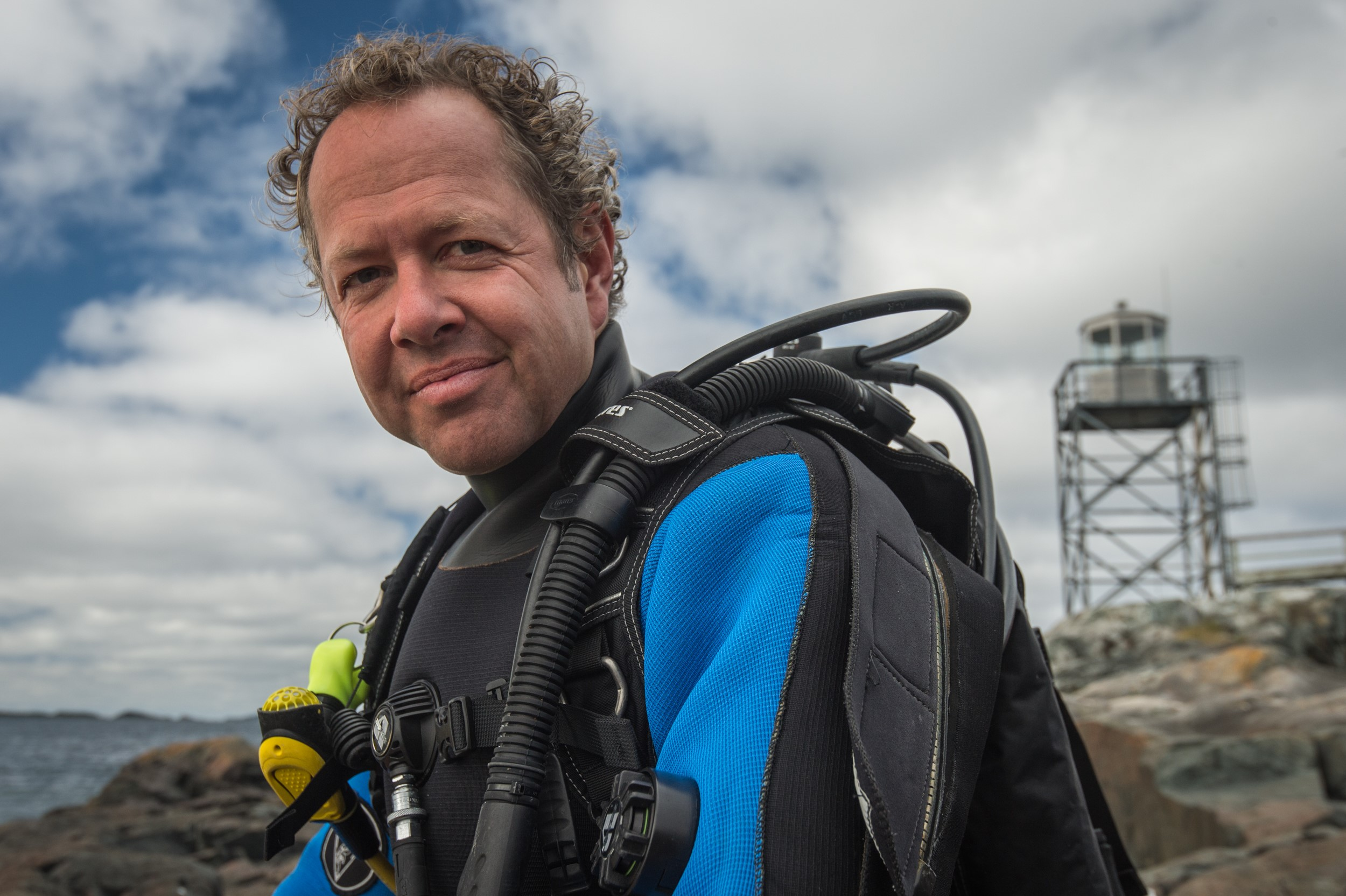
- Born: 1969 (age 56–57)
- Known for: Works on Global change, Overfishing
- Awards: E.W.R. Steacie Memorial Fellowship (2011) Heinz Maier-Leibnitz Award (2004)
- Scientific career
- Fields: Marine ecology, fisheries science
- Workplaces: Dalhousie University

Boris Worm is a marine ecologist, and a Killam Research Professor at Dalhousie University in Halifax, Nova Scotia, Canada.

Worm is known for his scientific contributions and commitment to spreading public awareness regarding marine conservation. In 2004 he received the German "Heinz Maier Leibnitz"-Award, an award for young researchers from the German Research Foundation (DFG).

== Selected publications ==
- Myers RA, Worm B (2003) Rapid worldwide depletion of predatory fish communities. Nature 423:280-283
- Worm, et al. (2006) Impacts of Biodiversity Loss on Ocean Ecosystem Services. Science, 314: 787-790
- Worm, et al. (2009) Rebuilding Global Fisheries. Science, 325 (5940): 578–585.
- Tittensor DP, Mora C, Jetz W, Lotze HK, Ricard D, Vanden Berghe, E, Worm B (2010) Global patterns and predictors of marine biodiversity across taxa. Nature 466: 1098-1101
- Mora C, Tittensor DP, Adl S, Simpson AGB, Worm B (2011) How many species are there on Earth and in the ocean? PLoS Biology 9: e1001127
- Pinsky ML, Worm B, Fogarty MJ, Sarmiento JL, Levin SA (2013) Marine taxa track local climate velocities. Science 341:1239-1242
- Worm B, Paine RT (2016) Humans as a hyperkeystone species. Trends in Ecology and Evolution 31:600-607
- Worm B, Lotze HK, Jubinville I, Wilcox C, Jambeck J. (2017) Plastic as a persistent marine pollutant. Annual Review of Environment and Resources 42:1-26
