= NaGISA =

International survey of biodiversity near the shore

- Established: 2002
- Headquarters: University of Kyoto in Japan
- Location: 128 sites in 51 countries
- Website: www.nagisa.coml.org

NaGISA (Natural Geography in Shore Areas or Natural Geography of In-Shore Areas) is an international collaborative effort aimed at inventorying, cataloguing, and monitoring biodiversity of the in-shore area. So named for the Japanese word "nagisa" ("where the land meets the sea"), it is an Apronym. NaGISA is the first project of the larger CoML effort (Census of Marine Life) to have global participation in actual field work. The actual procedures of this project involve inexpensive collection equipment (for easy universal participation). This equipment is used to photograph sampling sites, to actually take samples from the sites, and to process these samples. At each site throughout the world, samples are taken from the intertidal zone out to a depth of 10 meters (and optionally out to 20 meters depth). These samples are then processed (the organisms are isolated) and then analyzed and catalogued. The information (regarding the kind and number of organisms analyzed) is sent to the global headquarters of NaGISA- the University of Kyoto in Japan. All of this information is then collated on the Ocean Biogeographic Information System (OBIS website). The end goal of the larger CoML effort is to find what was, what is, and what will be in the world's oceans. For NaGISA the goal is to find this in the world's in-shore areas.

== See also ==
- Ecological forecasting
