= Register of Antarctic Marine Species =

Taxonomic database for Antarctic marine species

The Register of Antarctic Marine Species, also known as RAMS, is a taxonomic database that provides a list of marine species found in the Southern Ocean surrounding Antarctica.

Its purpose is to provide authoritative and comprehensive information on the diversity of marine life in the region, which provides a reference point for marine science, research, conservation and sustainable management. The database includes marine species found on the sea floor, in the water column, and around sea-ice. RAMS is a regionally-focused database within the World Register of Marine Species.
