= Mid-Atlantic Ridge Ecosystem Project =

International research project on animal communities

Mid-Atlantic Ridge Ecosystem Project (MAR-ECO)
- Project coordinator: Norwegian Institute of Marine Research
- Duration: 2001 – 2011
- Website: mar.eco.no

The Mid-Atlantic Ridge Ecosystem Project, also known as MAR-ECO or ECOMAR, was an international research project part of the Census of Marine Life that included scientists from 16 nations to investigate life on the Mid-Atlantic Ridge from Iceland to Azores. Norway, represented by the Institute of Marine Research and the University of Bergen, coordinated the project. The goal of the project was to sample and observe all organisms from surface waters to the sea floor.

== Background ==
MAR-ECO was one of 14 projects of the Census of Marine Life and covered the northern Atlantic Ocean region of the globe. The Mid-Atlantic Ridge is the volcanic mountain range in the middle of the ocean, marking the spreading zone between the Eurasian and American continental plates. New ocean floor is constantly being formed, and Iceland and the Azores are volcanic islands along the ridge that the project sampled between. The project studied many groups of marine life, including fish, crustaceans, cephalopods, cnidarians, and zooplankton living either near the seabed or above the ridge and returned over 80,000 biological specimens over the project life. As with other projects within the Census, the extent of life in this region before MAR-ECO's sampling was largely unknown.

== Research Expeditions ==
Field phases were conducted during 2003–2005 and 2007–2010, including a two-month international expedition in 2004 by the Norwegian research vessel RV G.O. Sars. Research vessels from Iceland, Russia, Germany, the United Kingdom, the United States, and Portugal also contributed to the project. In June 2003, a joint Russian–United States expedition using the crewed submersibles MIR-1 and MIR-2 transported scientists to areas reaching depths of approximately 4,500 metres that had not previously been visited by humans.

MAR-ECO and the Census of Marine Life emphasises public outreach and enjoyed considerable public attention and support.

=== Management ===
The MAR-ECO management consists of a Norwegian secretariat, a public outreach group, and an international steering group. The co-ordinating institutions are Institute of Marine Research and the University of Bergen in Norway.

Members of the international steering group are experienced scientists from key institutions in Norway, Iceland, Portugal (Azores), France, Germany, United Kingdom, USA, Russia and Brazil. Chair: Odd Aksel Bergstad, Norway.

The project consists of 10 integrated science components dealing with different key objectives, each with dedicated teams and principal investigators. In addition, a range of education and outreach components facilitates dissemination of results to a wide audience.

Common critical tasks are funded by A.P.Sloan Foundation (USA), and national sources.

==== Public Outreach Group and Associates ====
The Public Outreach Group is based in Bergen, Norway, but has associates among project participants in other countries. The group works closely with the Education and Outreach team of the Census of Marine Life based in the USA.

== Results ==
The Mar-ECO project presented an exhibit in the Sant Ocean Hall of the Smithsonian Museum of Natural History in Washington, DC in 2010. The exhibit featured specimens, photography, art, models, and multimedia about the discoveries of the program.

The MAR-ECO website was taken down in the early 2020s, but can still be accessed on the Wayback Machine.
