= European Multidisciplinary Seafloor and water column Observatory =

Large-scale European distributed Research Infrastructure for ocean observation

European Multidisciplinary Seafloor and water-column Observatory
- EMSO Logo

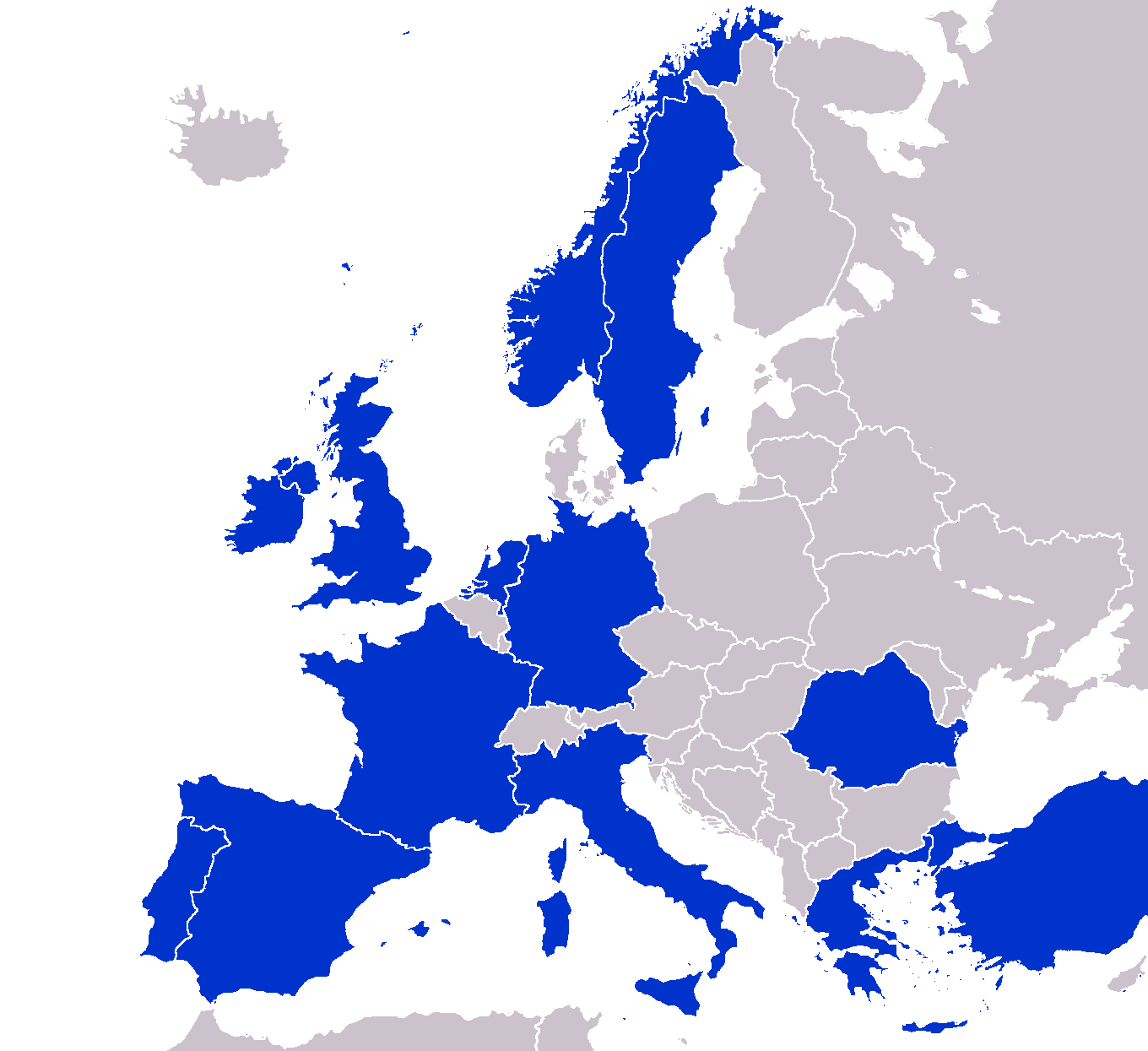
- Involved countries
- Abbreviation: EMSO
- Headquarters: Rome, Italy
- Members: 13 involved countries
- Director General: Juan Jose Dañobeitia (Coordinator)
- Website: http://www.emso-eu.org

European Multidisciplinary Seafloor and water-column Observatory (EMSO) is a large-scale European distributed Research Infrastructure for ocean observation, enabling real-time interactive long term monitoring of ocean processes. EMSO allows study of the interaction between the geosphere, the biosphere, the hydrosphere, and the lithosphere; including natural hazards, climate change, and marine ecosystems. EMSO nodes have been deployed at key sites in European seas, starting from the Arctic, through the Atlantic and Mediterranean, to the Black Sea.

== Overview ==
EMSO is a consortium of partners sharing a common strategic framework of scientific facilities (data, instruments, computing and storage capacity). EMSO is a European Research Infrastructure Consortium (ERIC), a specific legal form created for pan-European large-scale research infrastructures by the European Commission that facilitates the establishment and operation of Research Infrastructures with European interest.. EMSO is one of the environmental RIs on the Roadmap of the European Strategy Forum on Research Infrastructures (ESFRI). The ESRFI Roadmap identifies RIs of pan-European importance that corresponds to the long term needs of European research communities.

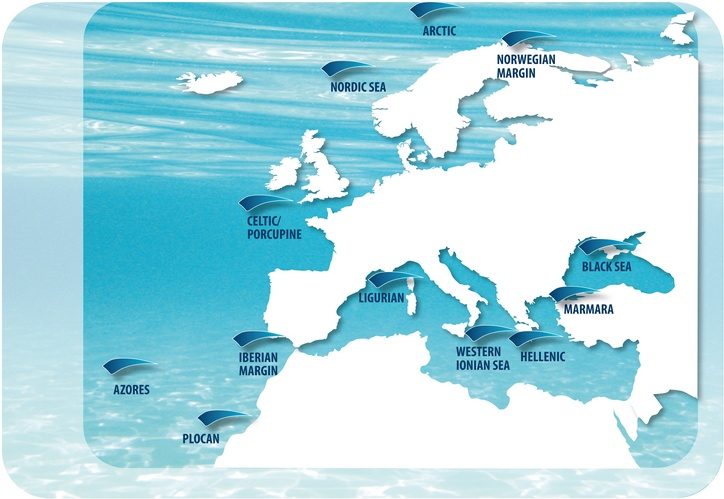
EMSO Sites Map

The different EMSO nodes are designed to address topics of regional importance: the biodiversity of mid ocean hot vents in the Azores region, the rapidly changing environmental conditions affecting the geosphere and biosphere of the Arctic, the deep-water ventilation in the eastern Mediterranean, the active seismicity and the associated geo-hazards of the Anatolian region. EMSO infrastructure has the capacity to observe the deep and open ocean, below, at and above the seafloor, at the European scale, utilizing both stand-alone observing systems, and nodes connected to shore stations through high throughput fibre optic cable. The mission of EMSO is to unite these regional observatories into a common research infrastructure, to implement more generic sensor packages to collect synoptic data series on oceanographic features of more than regional interest, to bring these data together in a uniform format accessible to the general public, and to ensure maintenance of this research infrastructure over a longer time-span than easily maintained by national funding programs.

== Ocean observatories ==
The global oceans cover 70% of the surface of the globe, consist of 95% of the living space, and are the core momentum of our planet's physical, chemical, and biological cycles. As underlined in recent policy documents such as the Galway Statement and Belmont Challenge, in order to understand the changes predicted in the coming decades, EMSO aims to have a continuous presence in the oceans; and in order to understand both the slow moving and rapid catastrophes, EMSO seeks to have continuous real-time data from which to learn and to derive adaptation and early warning systems. Ocean observatories provide power and communications to allow a sustained interactive presence in the ocean. This challenge can only be addressed as part of an international cooperation between USA, Canada, Japan, Australia, Europe and other interested countries where EMSO takes a role for the European side.

== Major science themes ==
The deployment of the EMSO distributed observatory nodes is allowing researchers to get useful data in order to understand the behaviour of the oceans and their impact on human society. In particular, EMSO collects data concerning the following main scientific fields:

- Geosciences: gas hydrate stability, seabed fluid flows, sub-marine landslides, geo-hazard early warning, mid-ocean ridge volcanism.
- Physical Oceanography: ocean warming, deep-ocean circulation, benthic and water-column interactions.
- Biogeochemistry: ocean acidification and the solubility pump, the biological pump, hypoxia, continental shelf exchange, deep-ocean biogeochemical fluxes.
- Marine Ecology: climate forcing of ecosystems, molecules to microbes, fisheries, marine noise, deep biosphere, chemosynthetic ecology.

== EMSO ERIC ==
The Preparatory Phase of EMSO was funded by the European Seventh Framework Programme (FP7), involving 12 countries of the European area (Italy, France, Germany, Ireland, Spain, Sweden, Greece, UK, Norway, Portugal, Turkey, the Netherlands), and Romania (through GeoEcoMar), that has been involved as external interested country from 2010. The Preparatory Phase prepared the foundation for the adoption of the ERIC (European Research Infrastructure Consortium), that is the legal entity in charge of coordinating and facilitating access to these nodes of open ocean fixed point observatory distributed infrastructure.

EMSO ERIC is the central point of contact for observatory initiatives in other parts of the world to set up and promote cooperation in this field. EMSO ERIC integrates research, training, and information dissemination activities for ocean observatory nodes in Europe and enables scientists and other stakeholders to make efficient use of the EMSO distributed infrastructure around Europe.

== EMSO Partners ==
- HCMR (Greece)
- INGV (Italy)
- UIT (Norway)
- Ifremer (France)
- CNRS (France)
- IMI (Republic of Ireland)
- UTM-CSIC (Spain)
- UGOT (Sweden)
- FFCUL (Portugal)
- ITU-EMCOL (Turkey)
- NIOZ (Netherlands)
- GeoEcoMar (Romania)
- KDM (Germany)
- NOCS (United Kingdom)

== List of projects ==
List of projects
Project	Full name	Year	Funding	Lead	Details	Outcome
ABEL	Abyssal BEnthic Laboratory	1990-1993	FP3-MAST2	Tecnomare	M. Berta et al. Abyssal BEnthic Laboratory (ABEL): a novel approach for long-term investigation at abyssal depths, Journal of Marine Systems, Volume 6, Issue 3, 1995, Pages 211-225, ISSN 0924-7963	Feasibility and financial study aimed at identifying the scientific requirements, possible technological solutions and opportunities for the development of an Abyssal BEnthic Laboratory
DESIBEL	Deep-Sea Intervention on future BEnthic Laboratory	1990-1993	FP3-MAST2	IFREMER	https://cordis.europa.eu/project/id/MAS20082 "New methods for deep sea intervention on benthic laboratories". DESIBEL project. Final results, comparisons of concepts and at sea validation V. Rigaud et al. IEEE Oceanic Engineering Society. OCEANS'98. Conference Proceedings (Cat. No.98CH36259)	Feasibility study aimed at investigating methods for deployment and intervention on future benthic stations
GEOSTAR	GEophysical and Oceanographic STation for Abyssal Research	1995-1998	FP4-MAST3	INGV	https://cordis.europa.eu/project/id/MAS3950007	Realization of a multidisciplinary observatory for deep-sea application
ALIPOR	Autonomous Lander Instrument Packages for Oceanographic Research	1996-1999	FP4-MAST3	University of Aberdeen	https://cordis.europa.eu/project/id/MAS3950010	Autonomous landers that can conduct experiments and gather data on the sea floor have the potential to revolutionise oceanographic research. By using a number of landers, the spatial and temporal coverage of a single ship can be increased by orders of magnitude. Joint experiments in the Porcupine zone with FP4 – MAST3 BENGAL project.
GEOSTAR 2	GEophysical and Oceanographic STation for Abyssal Research 2nd phase: Deep-sea Scientific Mission	1999-2001	FP4-MAST3	INGV	https://archimer.ifremer.fr/doc/00061/17268/14778.pdf	Deep-sea mission of the observatory realized in the GEOSTAR project. Underwater volcano Massili north of Sicily.
ASSEM	Array of sensors for long term seabed monitoring of geohazards	2002-2004	FP5-EESD	IFREMER	https://cordis.europa.eu/project/id/EVK3-CT-2001-00051 https://archimer.ifremer.fr/doc/00061/17272/14782.pdf	The project developed an underwater network for shallow waters (600 m w.d.) able to communicate in two ways with the land through a surface buoy acoustically linked with the underwater systems. Experiment in Gulf of Corinth and Norwegian Fjord.
ORION-GEOSTAR-3	Ocean Research by Integrated Observation Networks	2002-2005	FP5-EESD	INGV	https://cordis.europa.eu/project/id/EVK3-CT-2001-00067 http://www.moist.it/projects/orion-geostar3/4 https://archimer.ifremer.fr/doc/00061/17268/14778.pdf	The project represented the passage from a single node to a constellation, and realized a deep-water network able to communicate in underwater via acoustics with a main node and this main to communicate always via acoustics with a relay surface buoy linked to land via radio and satellite. ORION realized one of the first example of a near-real-time deep-sea network. Experiment in Gulf of Corinth.
ESONET-CA	European Seafloor Observatory Network-Concerted Action	2002-2004	FP5	University of Aberdeen	http://www.abdn.ac.uk/ecosystem/esonet http://www.esonet-noe.org/Associated-projects/ESONET-CA	Assessment of European capability in ocean observatories Site identification, technological issues.
EXOCET/D	EXtreme ecosystem studies in the deep OCEan:Technological Developments	2004-2006	FP6-SUSTDEV	IFREMER	https://cordis.europa.eu/project/id/505342	Technological development of a specific instrumentation allowing the study of natural or accidentally perturbed ecosystems found in the deep ocean. Experiment in MoMar Azores site.
ESONIM	European Seafloor Observatories Implementation Model	2004-2007	FP6	Marine Institute	http://www.esonet-noe.org/Associated-projects/ESONIM	Case study on Porcupine Abyssal Plain site to investigate legal and financial aspects and develop a Business Plan.
NEAREST	Integrated Observations from NEAR shore SourcES of Tsunamis: toward an early warning system	2006-2010	FP6	CNR	http://nearest.bo.ismar.cnr.it/documentation	NEAREST activities included land investigations in areas of Portugal affected in the past by run-up of tsunamis, inundation maps, oceanographic campaigns for defining specific and reliable velocity models to be used in earthquake localizations, 1-year OBS campaign to detect seismic activity. In particular, INGV was in charge of the deposition for almost 2 years in near-source area in the Gulf of Cadiz at over 3200 m w.d. of a GEOSTAR-type multidisciplinary observatory, specifically enhanced with a prototypal system of Tsunami Early Warning.
ESONET-NoE	European Seafloor Observatory Network-Network of Excellence	2007-2011	FP6-SUSTDEV	IFREMER	https://cordis.europa.eu/project/id/36851 http://www.esonet-noe.org/	Integration of the scientific/technological “Observatory Science” Community. Demonstration missions in Haakon Mosby mud volcano, Arctic Ocean Fram Strait, Porcupine Abyssal Plain, Momar Azores, West Ionian Sea, Gulf of Cadiz, Marmara Sea, Ligurian Sea.
EuroSITES	Integration and enhancement of key existing European deep-ocean observatories	2008-2011	FP7 - Environment	NERC	Ehttps://cordis.europa.eu/project/id/202955/	Water-column observatories in Europe, related to OceanSites. Building agreed methods to collect time series of basic variables and common data protocols for real time and delayed mode observation. Complete ocean observatory data management system.
ENVRI	Common Operations of Environmental Research Infrastructures	2011-2014	FP7	Amsterdam University	https://cordis.europa.eu/project/id/283465	The project aimed at pursuing solutions and defining guidelines for the commonalities of ESFRI environmental research infrastructures.
EMSO-PP	European Multidisciplinary Seafloor and water-column Observatory-Preparatory Phase	2008-2012	FP7-Infrastructures	INGV	https://cordis.europa.eu/project/id/211816	Development of the management structure: legal, governance and financial issues.
HYPOX	In-situ monitoring of oxygen depletion in hypoxic ecosystems of coastal and open seas, and land-locked water bodies	2009-2012	FP7	Max Planck Institute for Marine Microbiology	https://cordis.europa.eu/project/id/226213/reporting	The project had as the main goal to increase in-situ monitoring systems for oxygen depletion in hypoxic ecosystems of coastal and open seas, and land-locked water bodies (such as lagoons) to better understand the global change effects on this phenomenon.
MARSITE	New Directions in Seismic Hazard Assessment through Focused Earth Observation in the Marmara Supersite	2012-2015	FP7-Supersites	KOERI-Kandilli Observatory	https://cordis.europa.eu/project/id/308417/reporting www.marsite.eu	The project included several research groups with different scientific background (from seismology to engineering, from geophysics to geochemistry) in multidisciplinary monitoring activities in the Marmara Sea (considered a Supersite for the seismology).
Fix$O_3$	Fixed Point Open Ocean Observatories	2013-2017	FP7-Infrastructures	NERC	https://cordis.europa.eu/project/id/312463 http://www.fixo3.eu/	Enhanced access to broad range of data and infrastructure Coordination among observatories
COOPEUS	Connecting Research Infrastructures. Strengthening the cooperation between the US and the EU in the field of environmental research infrastructures	2012-2015	FP7	MARUM-Bremen University	https://cordis.europa.eu/project/id/312118/reporting	The project aimed at implementing a sustainable cooperation between Europe and USA in the field of the environmental infrastructures, putting into relation homologous infrastructures to develop common policies, interoperability and synergies.
EMSODEV	EMSO implementation and operation: DEVelopment of instrument module	2015-2019	H2020-EU.1.4.1.1.	INGV	http://www.emsodev.eu/deliverables.html https://cordis.europa.eu/project/id/676555/reporting	EMSODEV is focused on development of EGIMs (EMSO Generic Instrument Modules) to ensure increased coordination, integration, interoperability and standardization across sites and disciplines, and of a DMP (Data Management Platform) to guarantee the data accessibility to the scientific users and stakeholders.
ENVRI-PLUS	supporting environmental research with integrated solutions	2015-2019	H2020	Helsinki University, then ICOS ERIC	https://www.envriplus.eu/ https://www.envriplus.eu/deliverables/	ENVRI-PLUS was a cluster of research infrastructures (RIs) for Environmental and Earth System sciences, built around ESFRI roadmap and associating leading e-infrastructures and Integrating Activities together with technical specialist partners. It included a marine domain where EMSO played a key role.
COOP+ (or COOP_PLUS)	Cooperation of Research Infrastructures to address global challenges in the environmental field	2016-2019	H2020	Cordoba University	http://www.coop-plus.eu/documents https://cordis.europa.eu/project/id/654131	The general goal was to strengthen the links and coordination of the European RIs related to Marine Science (EMSO), Arctic and Atmospheric Research (EISCAT), Carbon Observation (ICOS) and Biodiversity (LifeWatch) with international counterparts (NEON, TERN, AMISR/SRI, CGSM, OOI, INPA/LBA, IMOS, ONC, AMERIFLUX, etc.) and to leverage international scientific cooperation and data exchange with non-EU countries.
DANUBIUS-PP	PREPARATORY PHASE FOR THE PAN-EUROPEAN RESEARCH INFRASTRUCTURE DANUBIUS–RI “THE INTERNATIONAL CENTRE FOR ADVANCED STUDIES ON RIVER-SEA SYSTEMS	2016-2019	H2020-EU.1.4.1.1.	INSTITUTUL NATIONAL DE CERCETARE-DEZVOLTARE PENTRU GEOLOGIE SI GEOECOLOGIE MARINA-GEOECOMAR	https://danubius-pp.eu/	DANUBIUS-PP is a three-year project to raise DANUBIUS-RI (International Centre for Advanced Studies on River-Sea Systems) to the legal, financial and technical maturity required for successful implementation and development. DANUBIUS-RI is a pan-European distributed research infrastructure (RI) building on existing expertise to support interdisciplinary research on river-sea (RS) systems, spanning the environmental, social and economic sciences.
EMSO-Link	Implementation of the Strategy to ensure the EMSO ERIC Long-term Sustainability	2017-2020	H2020-EU.1.4.1.1	EMSO ERIC	https://cordis.europa.eu/project/id/731036/reporting	Underpins the long-term sustainability of EMSO. Structure developed. SLAs signed. Services defined.
ENVRI-FAIR	ENVironmental Research Infrastructures building Fair services Accessible for society, Innovation and Research	2019-2023	H2020-INFRAEOSC	FZJ - IAGOS	https://envri.eu/home-envri-fair/	The overarching goal is that at the end of the project, all participating Research Infrastructures have built a set of FAIR data services which enhances the efficiency and productivity of researchers, supports innovation, enables data- and knowledge-based decisions and connects the ENVRI Cluster to the EOSC
ENRIITC	European Network of Research Infrastructures & IndusTry for Collaboration	2020-2023	H2020-EU.1.4.2.1	EUROPEAN SPALLATION SOURCE ERIC	https://enriitc.eu/	It will build a permanent network of Industrial Liaison and Contact Officers (ILOs and ICOs) to maximise their engagement and boost the research infrastructures-industry partnerships.
EurofleetsPlus	An alliance of European marine research infrastructure to meet the evolving needs of the research and industrial communities.	2019-2023	H2020-EU.1.4.1.2.	MARINE INSTITUTE	https://www.eurofleets.eu/	EurofleetsPlus will facilitate open access to an integrated and advanced research vessel fleet, designed to meet the evolving and challenging needs of the user community. European and international researchers from academia and industry will be able to apply for several access programmes, through a single-entry system.
