= Census of Marine Life =

10 year international marine biological program

- Abbreviation: CoML
- Formation: 2000
- Purpose: Oceanography research
- Website: coml.org

The Census of Marine Life was a scientific initiative involving a global network of researchers in more than 80 nations, engaged to assess and explain the diversity, distribution, and abundance of life in the oceans. The census cost US$650 million and took ten years to produce; the first comprehensive Census of Marine Life was released in 2010 in London. Initially supported by funding from the Alfred P. Sloan Foundation, the project was successful in generating many times that initial investment in additional support and substantially increased the baselines of knowledge in often underexplored ocean realms, as well as engaging over 2,700 different researchers for the first time in a global collaborative community united in a common goal, and has been described as "one of the largest scientific collaborations ever conducted".

== Project history ==
According to Jesse Ausubel, Senior Research Associate of the Program for the Human Environment of Rockefeller University and science advisor to the Alfred P. Sloan Foundation, the idea for a "Census of Marine Life" originated in conversations between himself and Dr. J. Frederick Grassle, an oceanographer and benthic ecology professor at Rutgers University, in 1996. Grassle had been urged to talk with Ausubel by former colleagues at the Woods Hole Oceanographic Institution and was at that time unaware that Ausubel was also a program manager at the Alfred P. Sloan Foundation, funders of a number of other large scale "public good" science-based projects such as the Sloan Digital Sky Survey. Ausubel was instrumental in persuading the Foundation to fund a series of "feasibility workshops" over the period 1997-1998 into how the project might be conducted, one result of these workshops being the broadening of the initial concept from a "Census of the Fishes" into a comprehensive "Census of Marine Life". Results from these workshops, plus associated invited contributions, formed the basis of a special issue of Oceanography magazine in 1999; later that year, a workshop in Washington, D.C. addressed the formation of an Ocean Biogeographic Information System (OBIS) which would serve to collate existing knowledge about the distribution of organisms in the ocean and form the information management component of the Census.

The Census began in a formal sense with the announcement in May 2000 of eight grants totaling about 4 million US$ to create OBIS, as reported in Science magazine, 2 June. Meanwhile, an International Scientific Steering Committee was formed in 1999, which by 2001 envisaged "about half a dozen pilot [field] programs" for the period 2002-2004 which, along with OBIS and another project called "History of Marine Animal Populations" (HMAP), would provide the initial activities of the Census, to be followed by an additional series of field programs in 2005–2007, culminating in an analysis and integration phase in 2008–2010. During the operation of the Census, an additional non-field project was added, the Future of Marine Animal Populations (FMAP), which concentrated on forecasting the future of life in the oceans using modeling and simulation tools.

As a general method of working, project proposals would be debated within the Scientific Steering Committee and, if recommended for funding, a formal submission would be made to the Sloan Foundation for funding to support the Principal Investigators (PIs) and a Project Coordinator, meetings of project participants, and additional Synthesis and Education and Outreach activities. Since Sloan Foundation approval was dependent on promises of contributions from additional sources, and projects were encouraged to bring additional resources on board during their operation, the Foundation funds committed were effectively leveraged many times to provide a much more substantial program than would otherwise have been possible. As core infrastructure components, the Foundation also supported the Census' International Scientific Steering Committee and Secretariat, the U.S. National Committee, and an Education and Outreach Network to lift the project's visibility and engage other nations and organizations. The Census was ultimately estimated to have cost US$650 million, of which the Sloan Foundation contributed US$75 million with the remainder supplied by a large number of participating institutions, countries, and national and international organizations in the form of both direct and in-kind contributions. (Note: The Census was the largest, but not the only commitment of Sloan funds to "big science" in that decade; from information on its website https://www.sloan.org, the Foundation also provided US $11.5 million to the Barcode of Life project, an initial grant of $2.5 million to the Encyclopedia of Life, and $18 million to the ethics of Synthetic Biology. Funding to the Census may be eventually surpassed by that to the Sloan Digital Sky Survey (US $60 million to 2017, refer The Sloan Foundation's 25-year partnership with the Sloan Digital Sky Survey), however that program has existed over a considerably longer period (1992-current).)

In a retrospective review in 2011, David Penman and co-authors wrote:

The Census had its inception in a visionary leader (Grassle) who was able to convince a small group of colleagues of the need for such a project and find a like-minded individual (Ausubel) who saw the opportunity for the Sloan Foundation to take a key role in bring the Census to fruition. This was not leadership that sought out problems to solve – it identified an issue that could not be addressed through conventional national funding mechanisms and could only be approached through a large-scale collaborative endeavour. The Sloan Foundation saw the opportunity to facilitate new science that would also contribute knowledge for wide societal benefit.

== Census program ==
The Census consisted of three major component themes organized around the questions:

1. What has lived in the oceans?
2. What does live in the oceans?
3. What will live in the oceans?

The largest component of the Census involved investigating what currently lives in the world's oceans through 14 field projects. Each sampled the biota in one of six realms of the global oceans using a range of technologies. These projects were as follows:

- Arctic Ocean: ArcOD (Arctic Ocean Diversity)
- Antarctic Ocean: CAML (Census of Antarctic Marine Life)
- Mid-Ocean Ridges: MAR-ECO (Mid-Atlantic Ridge Ecosystem Project)
- Vents and Seeps: ChEss (Biogeography of Deep-Water Chemosynthetic Ecosystems)
- Abyssal Plains: CeDAMar (Census of Diversity of Abyssal Marine Life)
- Seamounts: CenSeam (Global Census of Marine Life on Seamounts)
- Continental Margins: COMARGE (Continental Margin Ecosystems)
- Continental Shelves: POST (Pacific Ocean Shelf Tracking Project)
- Near Shore: NaGISA (Natural Geography in Shore Areas)
- Coral Reefs: CReefs (Census of Coral Reefs)
- Regional Ecosystems: GoMA (Gulf of Maine Program)
- Microbes: ICoMM (International Census of Marine Microbes)
- Zooplankton: CMarZ (Census of Marine Zooplankton)
- Top Predators: TOPP (Tagging of Pacific Predators)

These field projects were complemented by the three non-field Census projects, namely HMAP, FMAP and OBIS. A series of National and Regional Implementation Committees (NRICs) was also established to progress the involvement of particular countries and regions in Census activities. Towards the end of the project, additional teams were created for education and outreach, and mapping and visualization products, while a "synthesis" group coordinated the final outcomes (publications, etc.).

== Outcomes ==
During its lifespan, the Census involved some 2,700 scientists from more 80 countries who spent 9,000 days at sea participating in more than 540 census-badged expeditions, as well as uncounted nearshore sampling events. In addition to many thousands of records of previously known species, Census scientists found more than 6,000 marine species potentially new to science and had completed formal descriptions of 1,200 of them up to 2010. Census scientists visited many parts of the global ocean to learn more about species ranging in size from the blue whale to minute zooplankton and microbes (bacteria and viruses); sampled from the world's coldest regions to the warm tropics, from deep-sea hydrothermal vents to coastal ecosystems; tracked the movements of fish and interrogated historical records to learn what the ocean used to be like before the influence of humans; and employed forecasting methods to predict what may happen to ocean life in the future. One of the largest scientific collaborations ever conducted, by 2011 the Census had produced over 3,100 scientific papers and many thousands of other information products, with over 30 million species distribution records freely available via OBIS.

As well as its tangible scientific legacy, the Census was instrumental in building a global community of researchers, many of whom had never collaborated before until they were brought together under the auspices of the Census, and a new approach to collaborative research. As Ian Poiner, outgoing chair of the Census has said, "The Census changed our views on how things could be done. We shared our problems and we shared our solutions." In their 2011 review of the Census commissioned by the Alfred P. Sloan Foundation, David Penman and co-authors wrote: "[Prior to the Census there was] A fragmented research community: Marine biodiversity researchers had few active coordinated national and international research programs and taxonomic research in particular was underfunded and scattered in disparate organizations... [there was] No culture of collaboration and data sharing: Unlike the oceanographic community, marine biology was characterized by small research projects leading to publications but there was little experience or willingness to openly collaborate and share data... [and in addition there was] No recognized open-access data portal for marine biodiversity data: Unlike the "physical science" oceanographic community, there was no recognized data depository or common standards for sharing marine biodiversity data."

As summarizing remarks, Penman et al., writing in 2011, stated:

The Census, by any statistical measure, was a great success. The large number of scientific papers published and still to be published by Census participants, alone, would be sufficient. Instead the Census has achieved truly global science in biology. It did not profess to provide a complete Census of life in the ocean in 2010 but it did substantially increase the baselines of knowledge in often underexplored ocean realms. From this knowledge base future research and surveys will add more data that can be shared through web-based services such as OBIS. From this we may be able to derive estimates of population diversity, distribution and abundance for selected groups of organisms or regions and a future compilation of such data will show how far our knowledge has moved from 2010... Undoubtedly much research on marine biodiversity would have been carried out over the last decade without the Census. But it would have lacked the global reach and the access to data and technologies that made the Census unique."

In 2011, the Census Steering Committee received the International Cosmos Prize in recognition of its decade of international ocean research spanning multiple scientific disciplines.

== Partnerships ==
The Census partnered with the Encyclopedia of Life in creating pages for marine species, and supplied marine material for DNA barcoding in the Barcode of Life project. Google and Census of Marine Life partnered on Google Earth 5.0. Ocean in Google Earth contains a layer devoted to the Census of Marine Life that allows users to follow scientists from the Census on expeditions and see marine life and features found during the Census. A partnership with the French film company Galatée Films resulted in the production of the film Oceans which was released in 2009, featuring film of over 200 species at more than 50 global locations.

== See also ==
- Marine life – Organisms that live in salt water
- Alfred P. Sloan Foundation – American philanthropic nonprofit organization
- Ocean Biodiversity Information System – Online marine biology database

== Bibliography ==
- Ausubel, Jesse H., Crist, Darlene Trew & Waggoner, Paul E. (eds). 2010. First Census of Marine Life 2010: Highlights of a Decade of Discovery. Census of Marine Life. ISBN 9781450731027. Available at http://www.coml.org/pressreleases/census2010/PDF/Highlights-2010-Report-Low-Res.pdf
- Snelgrove, Paul V. R. 2010. Discoveries of the Census of Marine Life: Making Ocean Life Count. Cambridge University Press, 270 pp. ISBN 9780521165129 (paperback), 9781107000131 (hardback).
- Penman, David, Pearce, Andrew and Morton, Missy. 2011. The Census of Marine Life: Review of Lessons Learned. Report to the Alfred P. Sloan Foundation, New York, June 2011. Landcare Research, New Zealand, Contract Report: LC 271. Available at https://www.landcareresearch.co.nz/uploads/public/researchpubs/MarineLifeCensusReview.pdf
