= Microbe (disambiguation) =

A microbe is an organism that is microscopic.

Microbe may also refer to:

- Microbe (comics), a Marvel Comics superhero
- The Microbe, a 1919 American comedy film starring Viola Dana
- Microbe Magazine, the news magazine of the American Society for Microbiology

== See also ==
- Saša Marković Mikrob, Serbian artist
