= Richard Dorman =

Richard Dorman may refer to:

- Richard Dorman (academic administrator), American college president
- Richard Dorman (diplomat), British diplomat
- Richard Lee Dorman (1922–2010), American architect
- Richie Dorman (born 1988), Welsh footballer
