= MSystems =

mSystems
- Discipline: Microbiology
- Language: English
- Edited by: Ashley Shade

Publication details
- History: 2015–present
- Publisher: American Society for Microbiology
- Open access: Yes
- License: CC-BY 4.0
- Impact factor: 5.2 (2025)

Standard abbreviations
- ISO 4: mSystems

Indexing
- ISSN: 2379-5077

Links
- Journal homepage; Latest Articles; Online archive

mSystems is a peer-reviewed open access scientific journal published by the American Society for Microbiology. It was created in 2015 by Jack A. Gilbert, to provide a venue for systems microbiology research. The current Editor in Chief is Ashley Shade.
