= Julie S. Cabus =

American federal law enforcement criminal investigator

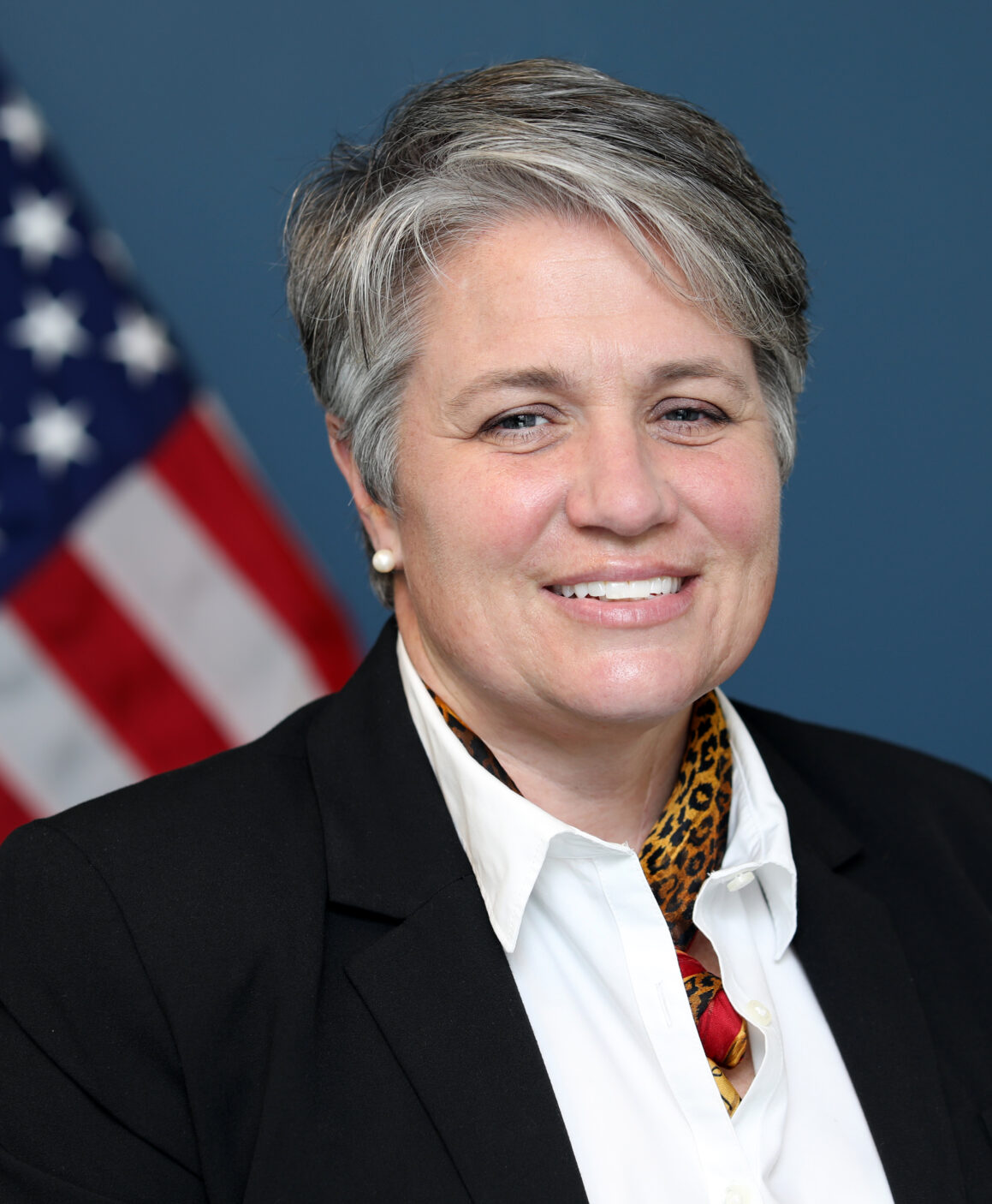
- A professional portrait of Julie S. Cabus

Deputy Assistant Secretary and Assistant Director of the U.S. Department of State’s Diplomatic Security Service (DSS)
- Incumbent
- Assumed office February 3, 2021
- President: Donald Trump
- Incumbent
- Assumed office February 3, 2021
- President: Joe Biden

Personal details
- Born: Julie S. Cabus Quantico, Virginia, U.S.
- Citizenship: United States of America
- Education: Susquehanna University (BA)
- Profession: Special agent

Julie S. Cabus (born 1975) is an American federal law enforcement criminal investigator who serves as the Supervisory Special Agent (SSA) as a Deputy Assistant Secretary and assistant director of the Diplomatic Security Service (DSS) Training Directorate since 2021. As a member of the Senior Foreign Service and team, she led and participated in numerous projects in the public and the private sectors, involving threat analysis and investigations, managing both domestic and overseas training of all security and law enforcement training programs and policies for DSS. Prior to her current employment, she served as the assistant director for DSS Threat Investigations and Analysis Directorate as the deputy assistant director at Office of Intelligence and Threat Analysis. As the Principal Deputy Assistant Secretary for the Diplomatic Security, she manages the Office of Anti-Terrorism, the Office of Technical Security Engineering, the Office of Mobile Security Deployments (MSD). Cabus served in the Diplomatic Security Service Washington Field Office as the Bureau Security Officer. Special Agent Julie Cabus has been employed with the United States Department of State Bureau of Diplomatic Security since March 1999 and was named head of security and law enforcement training at U.S. Department of State in March 2021.

== Early life and education ==
Julie Cabus was a Peace Corps volunteer in Gabon, Africa from 1995 to 1997. Her duties included raising funds through a gift exchange to provide supplemental humanitarian funding to residents of Gabon. Cabus graduated from Susquehanna University with a Bachelor of Arts in Political science and from the Marine Command and Staff College at Quantico, Virginia, with a Master's of Military studies.

== Career ==
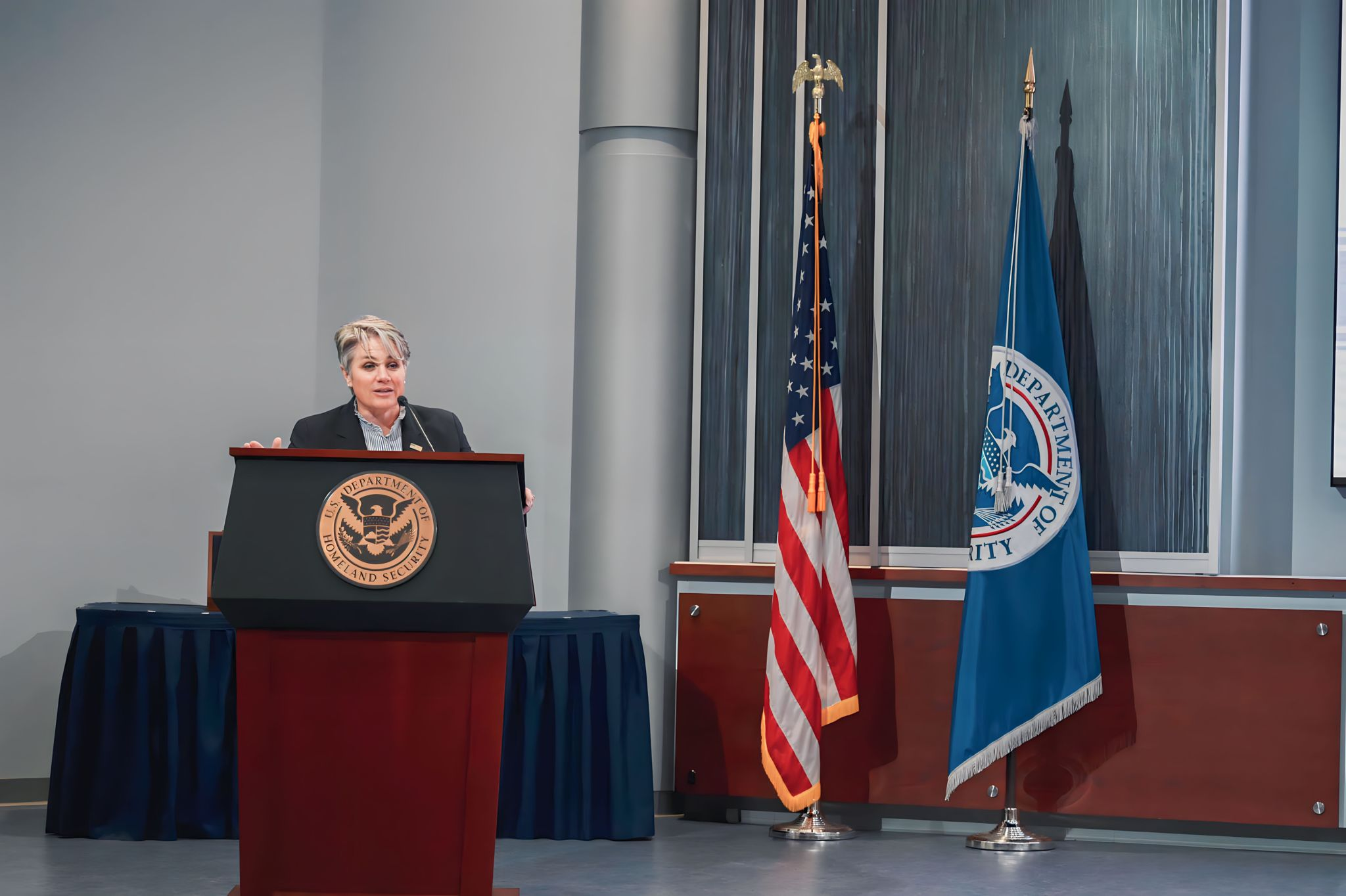
A photograph taken by the State Department Diplomatic Security Service (DSS) awarding Julie Cabus for the Federal Law Enforcement Training Centers 2022 Honor Graduate Award at Miami Field Office.

Cabus has served in Afghanistan, Australia, Algeria, Pakistan, Niger, and the Democratic Republic of the Congo. During her career with the U.S. Department of State, Cabus was the Assistant Regional Security Officer, Kinshasa, DRSC; Regional Security Officer, Niamey, Niger; Regional Security Officer, Peshawar, Pakistan; Regional Security Officer, Algiers, Algeria; Senior Regional Security Officer, United States Mission to Australia, Canberra, Australia; Deputy Regional Security Officer, Kabul, Afghanistan; and Senior Regional Security Officer, United States Mission to Iraq.

On 17 November 2021, Cabus was nominated before the 117th Congress Senate Foreign Relations Committee for promotion to the Senior Foreign Service rank of Minister-Counselor.

On 1 January 2023, Cabus was awarded the Federal Law Enforcement Training Centers (FLETC) 2022 Honor Graduate of the Year Award at the Diplomatic Security Service Miami Office. Cabus oversees all security and law enforcement training programs for the Diplomatic Security Service.

== See also ==
- Diplomatic Security Service
- Bureau of Diplomatic Security
- Rewards For Justice Program
- United States State Department
