= Quantico, Virginia =

- Town
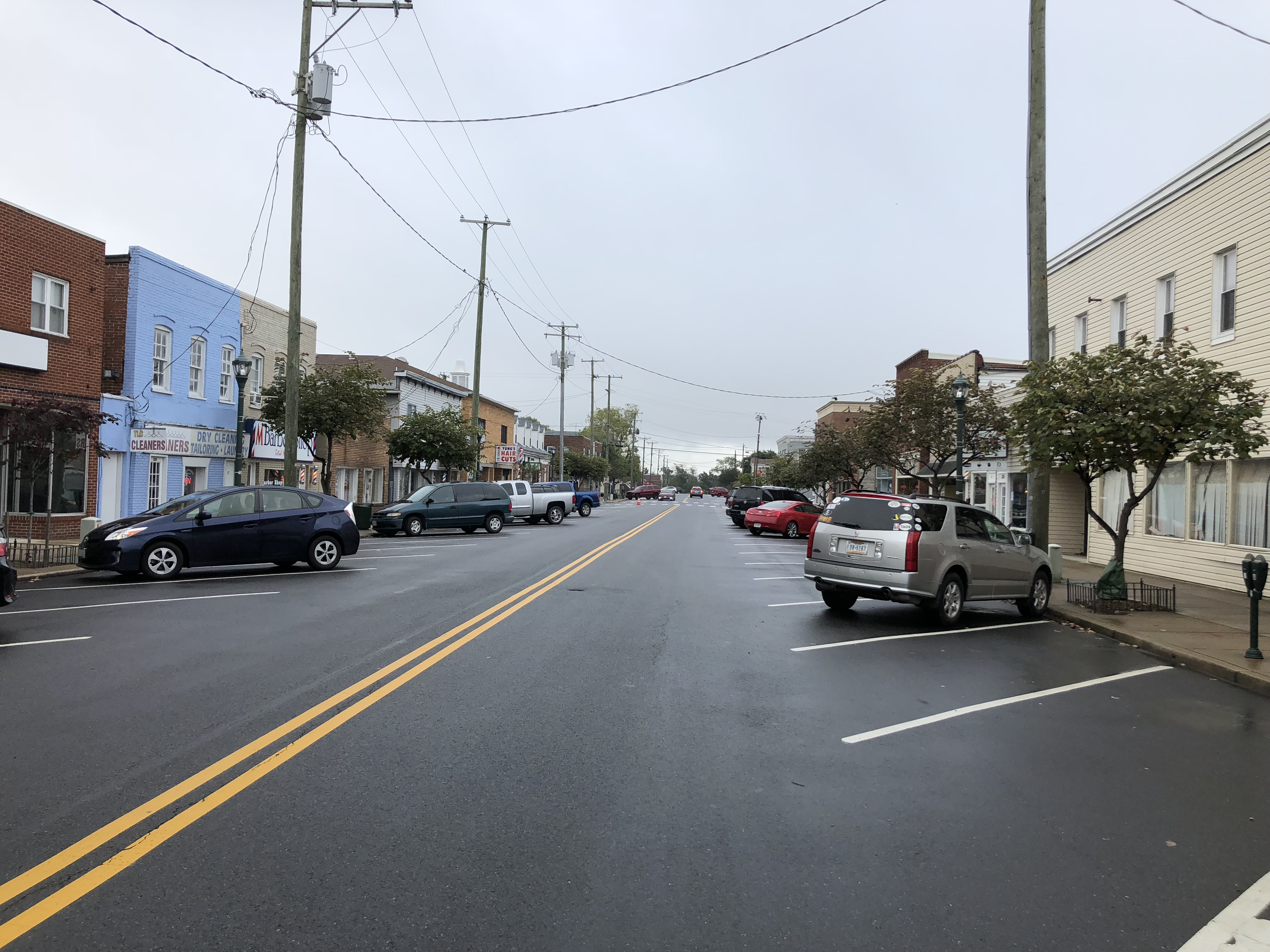
- Potomac Avenue in downtown Quantico

- Location in Prince William County and the state of Virginia

- Location within Virginia Location within the United States
- Coordinates: 38°31′19″N 77°17′23″W
- Country: United States
- State: Virginia
- County: Prince William

Area
  - Total: 0.069 sq mi (0.18 km^{2})
  - Land: 0.069 sq mi (0.18 km^{2})
  - Water: 0 sq mi (0.00 km^{2})
- Elevation: 39 ft (12 m)

Population (2020)
  - Total: 578
  - Density: 8,257/sq mi (3,188.1/km^{2})
- Time zone: UTC−5 (Eastern (EST))
  - Summer (DST): UTC−4 (EDT)
- ZIP Code: 22134
- Area codes: 571, 703
- FIPS code: 51-65120
- GNIS feature ID: 1499925
- Website: townofquantico.org

Quantico (/ˈkwɒntɪkoʊ/; formerly Potomac and Evansport) is a town in southeastern Prince William County, Virginia, United States. The population was 578 at the 2020 census. Quantico is approximately 35 miles southwest of Washington, D.C., bounded by the Potomac River to the east and the Quantico Creek to the north. The word 'Quantico' is a corruption of the name of a Doeg village recorded by English colonists as Pamacocack.

Quantico is surrounded on its remaining two sides by one of the largest U.S. Marine Corps bases, Marine Corps Base Quantico. The base is the site of the HMX-1 presidential helicopter squadron, the FBI Academy, the FBI Laboratory, the Marine Corps Combat Development Command, the Officer Candidates School, The Basic School, the United States Drug Enforcement Administration training academy, the Naval Criminal Investigative Service, the United States Army Criminal Investigation Division, and the Air Force Office of Special Investigations headquarters.

== Geography ==
Quantico is located in southeastern Prince William County, Virginia, United States. It is about 35 miles southwest of Washington, D.C., bounded by the Potomac River to the east and the Quantico Creek to the north.

According to the United States Census Bureau, the town has a total area of 0.07 square miles (0.2 km^{2}), all land.

=== Human geography ===
Quantico is surrounded on its remaining two sides by Marine Corps Base Quantico, one of the largest U.S. Marine Corps bases. The base is the site of the HMX-1 presidential helicopter squadron, the FBI Academy, the FBI Laboratory, the Marine Corps Combat Development Command, the Officer Candidates School, The Basic School, the United States Drug Enforcement Administration training academy, the Naval Criminal Investigative Service, the United States Army Criminal Investigation Division, and the Air Force Office of Special Investigations headquarters. A replica of the United States Marine Corps War Memorial stands at one of the entrances to the base.

=== Climate ===
Quantico has a humid subtropical climate (Köppen climate classification Cfa).

Climate data for Quantico, Virginia (Marine Corps Base Quantico) 1991–2020 normals, extremes 1945–present
Month	Jan	Feb	Mar	Apr	May	Jun	Jul	Aug	Sep	Oct	Nov	Dec	Year
Record high °F (°C)	82 (28)	85 (29)	89 (32)	96 (36)	99 (37)	105 (41)	106 (41)	104 (40)	105 (41)	97 (36)	85 (29)	81 (27)	106 (41)
Mean maximum °F (°C)	66.6 (19.2)	68.7 (20.4)	77.4 (25.2)	86.5 (30.3)	89.9 (32.2)	93.9 (34.4)	97.2 (36.2)	94.8 (34.9)	91.0 (32.8)	83.7 (28.7)	74.1 (23.4)	67.9 (19.9)	98.0 (36.7)
Mean daily maximum °F (°C)	44.8 (7.1)	48.3 (9.1)	56.3 (13.5)	67.8 (19.9)	75.5 (24.2)	83.7 (28.7)	88.0 (31.1)	86.1 (30.1)	79.5 (26.4)	68.8 (20.4)	57.8 (14.3)	48.6 (9.2)	67.1 (19.5)
Daily mean °F (°C)	36.6 (2.6)	39.4 (4.1)	46.7 (8.2)	57.5 (14.2)	66.1 (18.9)	74.8 (23.8)	79.3 (26.3)	77.6 (25.3)	70.8 (21.6)	59.2 (15.1)	48.6 (9.2)	40.4 (4.7)	58.1 (14.5)
Mean daily minimum °F (°C)	28.3 (−2.1)	30.4 (−0.9)	37.1 (2.8)	47.1 (8.4)	56.8 (13.8)	65.9 (18.8)	70.7 (21.5)	69.0 (20.6)	62.1 (16.7)	49.7 (9.8)	39.3 (4.1)	32.2 (0.1)	49.1 (9.5)
Mean minimum °F (°C)	11.8 (−11.2)	15.4 (−9.2)	21.6 (−5.8)	33.5 (0.8)	43.0 (6.1)	53.6 (12.0)	61.5 (16.4)	59.9 (15.5)	49.0 (9.4)	35.1 (1.7)	26.3 (−3.2)	19.7 (−6.8)	9.3 (−12.6)
Record low °F (°C)	−5 (−21)	−6 (−21)	8 (−13)	24 (−4)	31 (−1)	43 (6)	49 (9)	46 (8)	38 (3)	24 (−4)	13 (−11)	4 (−16)	−6 (−21)
Average precipitation inches (mm)	2.66 (68)	2.36 (60)	3.58 (91)	3.16 (80)	3.63 (92)	3.53 (90)	4.64 (118)	4.24 (108)	3.43 (87)	3.33 (85)	3.14 (80)	3.33 (85)	41.03 (1,042)
Average snowfall inches (cm)	3.5 (8.9)	5.8 (15)	1.4 (3.6)	0.0 (0.0)	0.0 (0.0)	0.0 (0.0)	0.0 (0.0)	0.0 (0.0)	0.0 (0.0)	0.0 (0.0)	0.0 (0.0)	1.7 (4.3)	12.4 (31)
Average precipitation days (≥ 0.01 in)	9.3	9.4	10.9	10.4	12.5	10.6	9.8	8.1	9.4	9.0	9.0	9.7	118.1
Average snowy days (≥ 0.1 in)	2.2	2.0	0.8	0.0	0.0	0.0	0.0	0.0	0.0	0.0	0.1	1.2	6.3
Source: NOAA

== Demographics ==
Historical population
Census	Pop.	Note	%±
1930	538		—
1940	1,139		111.7%
1950	1,240		8.9%
1960	1,015		−18.1%
1970	719		−29.2%
1980	621		−13.6%
1990	670		7.9%
2000	561		−16.3%
2010	480		−14.4%
2020	578		20.4%
2024 (est.)	591	▲	2.2%
U.S. Decennial Census

As of the census of 2000, there were 561 people, 295 households, and 107 families living in the town. The population density was 7,811.2 inhabitants per square mile (3,015.9/km^{2}). The racial makeup was 61.32% White, 20.32% African American, 10.16% Asian, 0.36% Native American, 2.32% from other races, and 5.53% from two or more races. Hispanic or Latino people of any race were 5.53% of the population. The median income for a household in the town was $36,250.

About 22.4% of families and 21.4% of the population were below the poverty line, including 39.4% of those under the age of 18.

== History ==
The word Quantico is a corruption of Pamacocack, the name of a Doeg tribe village meaning “by the long stream” as recorded by English colonists in 1608. The Manahoac branch of the tidewater Algonquin Indians inhabited the area north of Quantico in the 1500’s. They grew corn and fished.

Around 1690, a mill was built at the mouth of Quantico Creek. Scottish settlers traded in Virginia tobacco, which became a monoculture in the 17th and 18th century. They depended upon slaves. There was also a small iron industry. In 1774 Fredericksburg, south of Quantico, protested British taxation. Quantico served as main naval base for the Commonwealth of Virginia's fleet in the ensuing Revolutionary War. This and a silting harbor disrupted tobacco trade. Richard Henry Lee was a member of the Continental Congress.

== Popular culture ==
The headquarters of the FBI Academy at the Quantico Marine Corps Base are featured in the 1991 film The Silence of the Lambs, the 2013–2015 TV series Hannibal, and the 2015–2018 series Quantico. The headquarters of the FBI Behavioral Analysis Unit are also featured in the 2005–2020 and 2022–2025 series Criminal Minds, and the 2017–2019 series Mindhunter.

== Transportation ==
There are no significant highways passing through Quantico. All road vehicles must pass through Marine Corps Base Quantico in order to reach the town. A valid ID is required to enter the town by road and security may perform additional searches. All visitors and residents have ingress and egress rights, however.

Amtrak's Northeast Regional and Piedmont services, as well as the local Virginia Railway Express, all stop at Quantico station.

Stafford Regional Airport is the closest non-military airport, though the airfield exclusively serves general aviation and has no regularly scheduled commercial flights. Airports serving Washington, D.C. are the primary commercial air links for Quantico, with the closest being Reagan National Airport and the primary hub for international flights being Dulles International Airport.

== Notable people ==
- Julie S. Cabus, criminal investigator
- Robert L. Crawford Jr., actor on Laramie
- Stuart Duncan, bluegrass musician
- Geof Isherwood, artist
- Shelby Lynne, musician
- Brian Shul, pilot and photographer
- Roy Thomas, former pitcher for the Seattle Mariners

== See also ==
- Langley, Virginia
- Behavioral Analysis Unit
- Hostage Rescue Team
- Marine Corps Base Quantico
- Quantico station
- Quantico National Cemetery
