= Microbiology and Molecular Biology Reviews =

- Discipline: Microbiology
- Language: English
- Edited by: Corrella Detweiler

Publication details
- Former names: Bacteriological Reviews, Microbiological Reviews
- History: 1937-present
- Publisher: American Society for Microbiology (United States)
- Frequency: Quarterly
- Open access: Delayed, after 12 months
- Impact factor: 8.0 (2023)

Standard abbreviations
- ISO 4: Microbiol. Mol. Biol. Rev.

Indexing
- CODEN: MMBRF7
- ISSN: 1092-2172 (print); 1098-5557 (web)
- LCCN: 97660630
- OCLC no.: 36145205

Links
- Journal homepage; Latest Articles; Online issue archive

Microbiology and Molecular Biology Reviews (published as MMBR) is a peer-reviewed scientific journal published by the American Society for Microbiology.

== History ==
The journal was established in 1937 as Bacteriological Reviews (ISSN 0005-3678) and changed its name in 1978 to Microbiological Reviews (ISSN 0146-0749). It obtained its current title in 1997.
