= MicrobeLibrary =

MicrobeLibrary is a permanent collection of over 1400 original peer-reviewed resources for teaching undergraduate microbiology. It is provided by the American Society for Microbiology, Washington DC, United States.

Contents include curriculum activities; images and animations; reviews of books, websites and other resources; and articles from Focus on Microbiology Education, Microbiology Education and Microbe. Around 40% of the materials are free to educators and students, the remainder require a subscription. As of 2016 the service is suspended with the message to:

"Please check back with us in 2017".
