= Microbiology Spectrum =

- Discipline: Microbiology
- Language: English
- Edited by: Christina Cuomo

Publication details
- History: 2013-present
- Publisher: American Society for Microbiology (United States)
- Frequency: Bimonthly
- Open access: Yes
- License: CC BY
- Impact factor: 4.1 (2025)

Standard abbreviations
- ISO 4: Microbiol. Spectr.

Indexing
- ISSN: 2165-0497

Links
- Journal homepage; Online access; Online archive

Microbiology Spectrum is a peer-reviewed scientific journal published by the American Society for Microbiology. Topics the journal covers include: archaea, food microbiology, bacterial genetics, cell biology, physiology, clinical microbiology, environmental microbiology, ecology, eukaryotic microbes, genomics, computational and synthetic microbiology, immunology, pathogenesis, and virology.

The journal was established in October 2013. In Spring 2021, it became an online-only open access publication.

== Abstracting and indexing ==
The journal is abstracted and indexed in:

- BIOSIS Previews
- CAB Abstracts
- Current Contents/Life Sciences
- Embase
- Index Medicus/MEDLINE/PubMed
- Science Citation Index Expanded
- Scopus

According to the Journal Citation Reports, the journal has a 2025 impact factor of 4.1.
