= Microbe Magazine =

- Frequency: Monthly
- Circulation: 43,000
- Publisher: American Society for Microbiology
- First issue: January 1, 2006
- Country: USA
- Based in: Washington, D.C.
- Language: English
- Website: www.microbemagazine.org
- ISSN: 1558-7452

Microbe is the monthly news magazine of the American Society for Microbiology that is published in print (ISSN 1558-7452) and online (ISSN 1558-7460). The print version is distributed to the more than 43,000 members of the ASM. The online archive includes all issues since October 2006. Some articles are also available via the MicrobeLibrary online resource.

Monthly features found in each issue include letters, a report of ASM public affairs, several short articles by researchers in the field, summaries of articles of special interest published in ASM journals, a book review, and a selected post from the ASM blog Small Things Considered.
