= Jonathan D. Green =

Jonathan Green

15th President of Susquehanna University
- Incumbent
- Assumed office July 1, 2017

Personal details
- Born: 1964 (age 61–62) Upstate New York, U.S.
- Spouse: Lynn Buck
- Education: State University of New York at Fredonia (BMus); University of Massachusetts Amherst (MMus); University of North Carolina at Greensboro (DMA)

Jonathan D. Green (born 1964) is an American musicologist, composer, and academic administrator serving as president of Susquehanna University in Selinsgrove, Pennsylvania.

== Early life and education ==
Green was born and raised in Upstate New York. He earned a Bachelor of Music degree from the State University of New York at Fredonia and a master's degree from the University of Massachusetts Amherst. He completed a summer seminar at Trinity College, Oxford and completed additional postgraduate work at the Chautauqua Institution before earning his Doctorate of Musical Arts in conducting from the University of North Carolina at Greensboro. During his education, Green studied under Salvatore Macchia.

== Career ==
Green served as dean and vice president for academic affairs at Sweet Briar College. He also worked as provost and dean of faculty at Illinois Wesleyan University. Green took office as the 15th president of Susquehanna University on July 1, 2017. Green has written eight books on musical composition and numerous articles on higher education marketing.

== Awards ==
In 2022, Green was named to City & State Pennsylvania magazine’s 2022 Higher Education Power 100 in recognition for his strategic leadership for "sustainability, student recruitment, academic success and support for teaching". In 2020, Green was honored with the Arthur V. Ciervo Award by College & University Public Relations and Associated Professionals (CUPRAP) for "supporting and advancing the understanding of higher education".

Dr. Green is the Chair Emeritus of the Board of Directors of the nonprofit Association of Independent Colleges and Universities of Pennsylvania (AICUP).
