= Ashley Shade =

American microbiologist

Ashley L. Shade
- Education: University of Wisconsin-Madison; Susquehanna University
- Scientific career
- Fields: Microbial Ecology and Plant-Microbe Interactions
- Thesis: Aquatic bacteria, lakes, and water column overturn: a model microbial system for disturbance ecology (2010)
- Doctoral advisor: Katherine D. McMahon
- Website: https://ashley17061.wixsite.com/shadelab/home

Ashley L. Shade is a Director of Research with the Institute of Ecology and the Environment of Le Centre National de la Recherche Scientifique. Shade is an adjunct associate professor at Michigan State University in the Department of Microbiology and Molecular Genetics and Department of Plant, Soil and Microbial Sciences. She is best known for her work in microbial ecology and plant-microbe interactions.

== Education ==
Shade received her Bachelor of Science degree in biology from Susquehanna University. She received her Ph.D. from the University of Wisconsin-Madison under the supervision of Katherine D. McMahon. Her dissertation was on the disturbance ecology of freshwater microbial communities in vertically stratified lakes that experience lake turnover. Shade did her post-doctoral work at Yale University under Jo Handelsman as a Gordon and Betty Moore Foundation Scholar in the Life Sciences Research Foundation.

== Career and research ==
After completing her post-doctoral research at Yale, Shade moved to Michigan State University in 2014. Shade began her research group at Michigan State University as an assistant professor in the Department of Microbiology and Molecular Genetics (now the Department of Microbiology, Genetics and Immunology) and the Department of Plant Soil and Microbial Sciences. In 2021, Shade was promoted to associate professor. The lab was a founding member of the Michigan State Plant Resilience Institute and a part of the BioMolecular Sciences Graduate Training Program, the Great Lakes Bioenergy Research Center, and the Ecology, Evolutionary, and Behavior program at Michigan State University. In her career, Shade has promoted the importance of data accessibility, reproducibility, and diversity, equity, and inclusion and has spoken about work-life balance.

Shade has contributed to the fields of microbial ecology and plant-microbe interactions. For example, The Earth Microbiome Project works to collect and analyze microbial samples across the globe. These contributions have contributed to the general understanding of resilience in freshwater, soil and plant-associated microbiomes.

Shade's Lab focuses on microbial ecology and plant-microbe interactions by using Omics approaches to evaluate microbiomes. The lab has three main areas of research including ecological microbiome resilience, interactions in synthetic microbial communities, and plant-microbe-soil interactions to promote resilience to climate change.

In 2022, Shade moved to France to join the Centre National de la Recherche Scientifique as a director of research. She is part of the Laboratoire Ecologie Microbienne. There, she is working on how to increase the resilience of natural and agricultural systems, including crops and soils, by maintaining microbial functions despite changing environmental conditions due to climate change.

Shade is a senior editor for the American Society for Microbiology's journal mSystems and has previously been a guest editor for Phytobiomes Journal.

== Selected awards and recognition ==
- 2025 Presidential Early Career Award for Scientists and Engineers
- 2022 European Research Council Consolidator Award
- 2021 Michigan State University Graduate School Outstanding Faculty Mentor Award to junior faculty
- 2019: Ecological Society of America Early Career Fellow
- 2018: United States National Science Foundation CAREER award
- 2010–2013: Life Sciences Research Foundation Post-doctoral Fellow of the Gordon and Betty Moore Foundation
- 2009: University of Wisconsin-Madison Department of Bacteriology: Ira L. Baldwin Distinguished Predoctoral Fellowship for Excellence in Research
- 2008: University of Wisconsin-Madison Anna Grant Birge Award for Limnology Field Work

== Selected publications ==
- Barnett, Samuel E; Shade, Ashley (2024). "Arrive and wait: inactive bacterial taxa contribute to perceived soil microbiome resilience after a multidecadal press disturbance". Ecology Letters. 27 (3) e14393. Bibcode:2024EcolL..27E4393B. doi:10.1111/ele.14393. PMID 38430049.
- Vandepol, Natalie S; Shade, Ashley (2024). "Is everything everywhere? A hands-on activity to engage undergraduates with key concepts in quantitative microbial biogeography". Journal of Microbiology & Biology Education. 25 (2) e00170-23. doi:10.1128/jmbe.00170-23. PMC 11360409. PMID 38634606.
- Howe, A; Stopnisek, N; Dooley, SK; Yang, FM; Grady, KL; Shade, Ashley (2023). "Seasonal activities of the phyllosphere microbiome of perennial crops". Nature Communications. 14 (1) 1039. Bibcode:2023NatCo..14.1039H. doi:10.1038/s41467-023-36515-y. PMC 9950430. PMID 36823152.
- Shade, Ashley; Jacques, Marie-Agnès; Barret, Matthieu (2017). "Ecological patterns of seed microbiome diversity, transmission, and assembly". Current Opinion in Microbiology. 37: 15–22. doi:10.1016/j.mib.2017.03.010. PMID 28437661.
- Shade, Ashley (2017). "Diversity is the question, not the answer". The ISME Journal. 11 (1): 1–6. Bibcode:2017ISMEJ..11....1S. doi:10.1038/ismej.2016.118. PMC 5421358. PMID 27636395.
