= Susquehanna University =

Private university in Selinsgrove, Pennsylvania, U.S.

Coordinates: 40.8°N 76.874°W

- Former names: Missionary Institute of the Evangelical Lutheran Church (1858–1895); Susquehanna Female College (1858–1873)
- Motto: Achievement, Leadership, Service
- Type: Private liberal arts college
- Established: 1858; 168 years ago
- Accreditation: MSCHE
- Religious affiliation: Evangelical Lutheran Church in America
- Academic affiliations: Annapolis Group AAC&U ACE CIC CUR NAICU
- Endowment: $242.6 million (2025)
- President: Jonathan D. Green
- Faculty: 226
- Undergraduates: 2,239
- Location: Selinsgrove, Pennsylvania, United States
- Campus: Small college town 297 acres (120 ha)
- Colors: Orange and maroon
- Nickname: River Hawks
- Sporting affiliations: NCAA Division III - Landmark Conference
- Mascot: Benny the Hawk
- Website: www.susqu.edu

Susquehanna University is a private liberal arts college in Selinsgrove, Pennsylvania, United States. Founded in 1858 as a Lutheran missionary institute, it became coeducational in 1873 and adopted its present name in 1895.

Susquehanna enrolls approximately 2,200 students and is organized into four academic schools, including the AACSB-accredited Sigmund Weis School of Business.

== History ==
=== Founding and coeducation ===
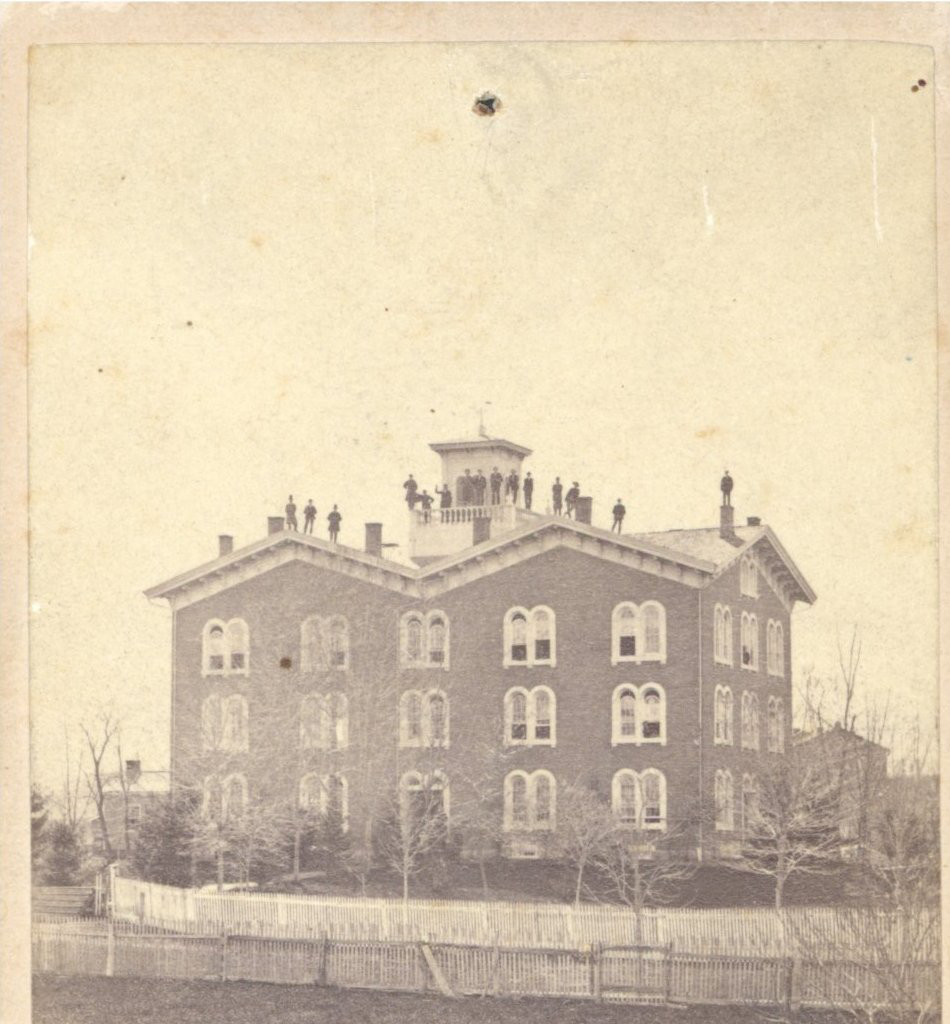
The Missionary Institute's first building, known as Selinsgrove Hall

The institution was founded by Benjamin Kurtz, its first president. Having already assisted in the founding of Gettysburg Seminary, Kurtz wanted to create another institution to serve American Lutheranism.

Kurtz's mission was to "educate men for the gospel ministry ... who cannot take a full course of training adapted to their age and circumstances." The Lutherans in Selinsgrove provided 50 students, pledged $22,000, and offered the provisional use of its church facilities. However, they stipulated that the institute be expanded to a junior college and that a sister college for women also be formed.

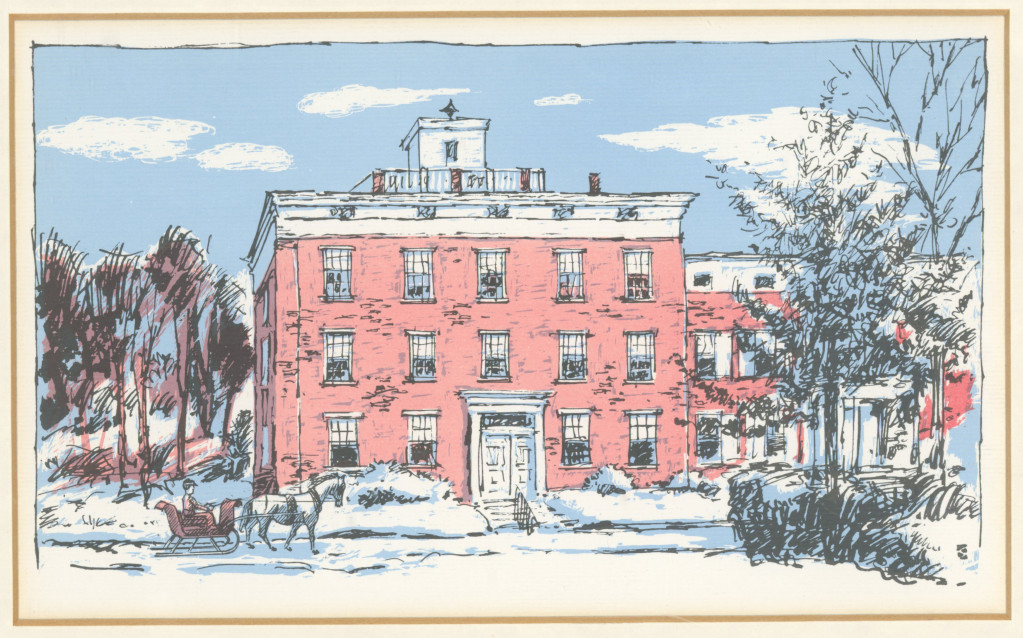
Drawing of the Susquehanna Female College

On September 1, 1858, the Missionary Institute of the Evangelical Lutheran Church and Susquehanna Female College were established and legally recognized 23 days later. It had two departments, the theology department and the classical department. In 1873, the sister college disbanded and the institute became co-educational.

The institute officially became known as Susquehanna University in 1895. Its name shows its location in the Susquehanna Valley, near the eponymous river for which the Susquehanna Synod of the Evangelical Lutheran Church in the United States was named.

=== 20th century development ===
The 20th century brought many changes. The institution had recently begun offering bachelor degrees and changed its name to reflect that. In 1903, the board approved Susquehanna’s colors, orange and maroon.

By the 1920s, student enrollment skyrocketed, accommodations were refurbished, the campus expanded, and academic departments and offerings were enhanced.

=== Recent developments ===
In 2018, Susquehanna expanded to offer a master of education.

== Academics ==
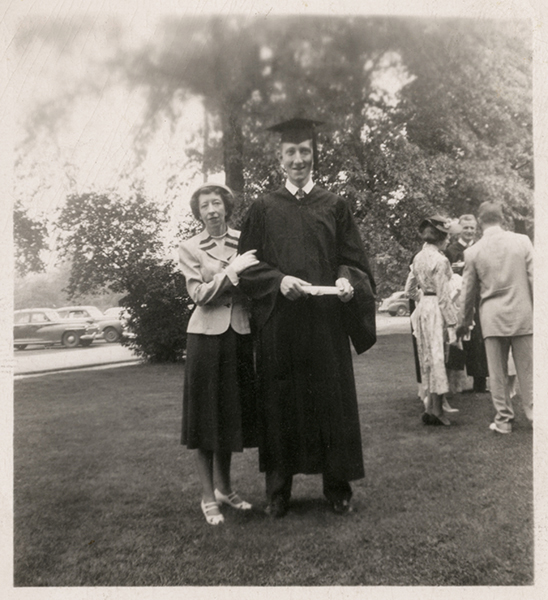
Susquehanna University Graduation, 1951

Susquehanna University is devoted primarily to undergraduate education, though does offer a master of education in curriculum and instruction. The university is accredited by the Middle States Commission on Higher Education.

The institution offers 84 majors, 69 minors, and programs and allows students to design their own major, complete a double degree, or start undeclared. Susquehanna offers pre-professional programs in pre-law, pre-veterinary medicine and teaching, and coordinates degrees with several other universities. It has joint-degree programs with other institutions for engineering and a master of business administration.

Susquehanna has a student-to-faculty ratio of 12:1 with 95% of full-time faculty holding a doctorate or highest equivalent degree.

In 2026, an average of 93% of graduates were enrolled in graduate school or employed within six to twelve months of graduation.

=== Organization and administration ===
Susquehanna University consists of four schools: School of the Arts, School of Humanities, School of Natural and Social Sciences, and the Sigmund Weis School of Business.

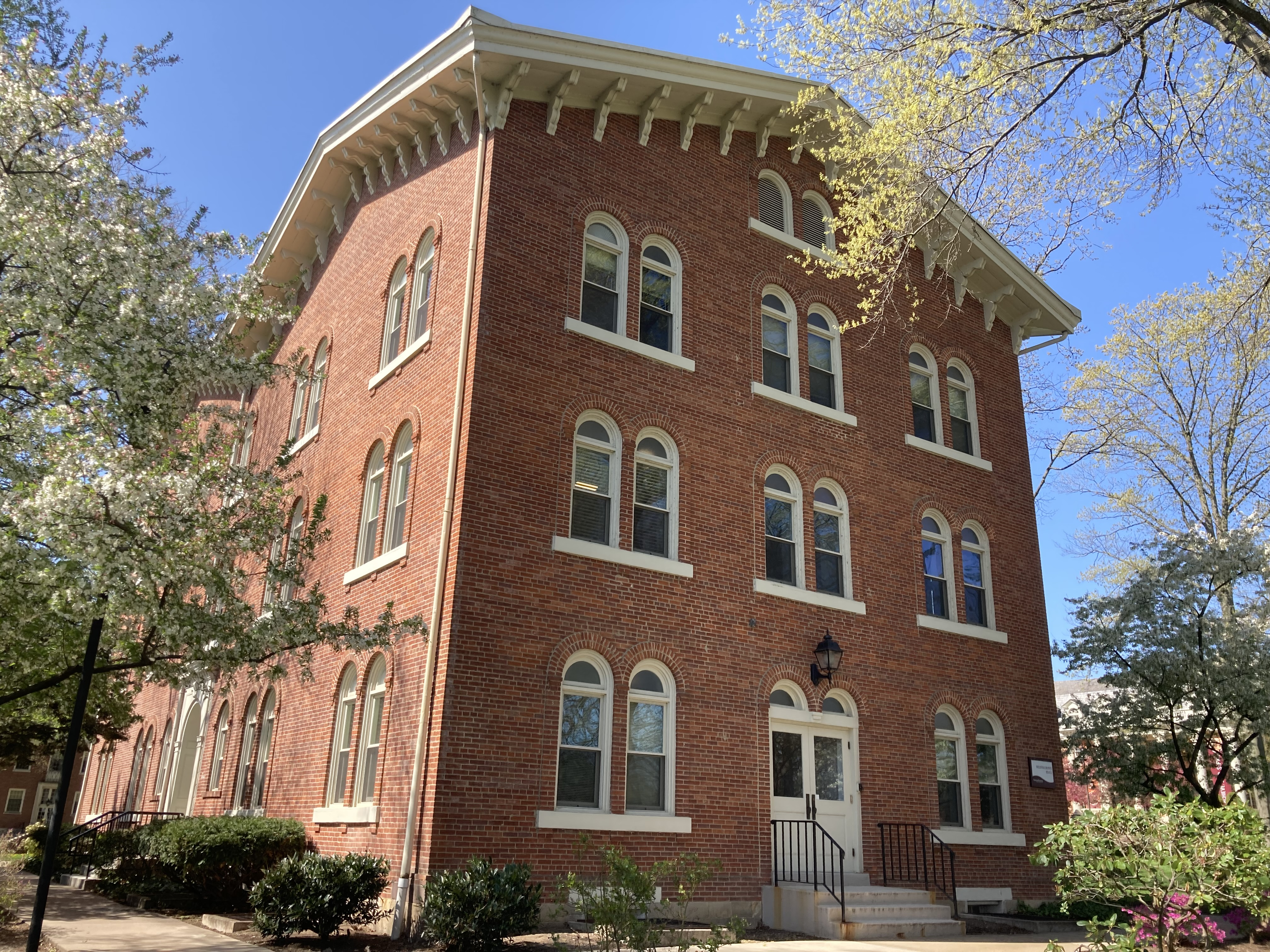
Selinsgrove Hall, listed on the National Register of Historic Places, is the oldest building on campus.

=== Rankings ===
Publication	Rank	Year	References
U.S. News & World Report	85th best liberal arts college in the United States	2027	
U.S. News & World Report	81st top private schools in the United States	2027	
U.S. News & World Report	46th best value school in the United States	2027	
Forbes	25th best private schools with generous aid in the United States	2026	
Wall Street Journal	191st best college in the United States	2026	
New York Times	71st top U.S. college for students’ economic diversity	2024	
Money	Best Colleges in America	2026	
Princeton Review	"Best 392 Colleges" in the United States	2027	
Princeton Review	"Best Green Colleges" in the United States	2025	
Princeton Review	"Best Mid-Atlantic Schools" in the United States	2027	

=== Study abroad ===
The GO Program, as part of a school policy adopted in 2009, requires all Susquehanna students go off-campus for cross-cultural learning. Students have a choice between GO Short programs of 2–3 weeks or semester-long GO Long programs. In 2013, the GO Program was awarded the Andrew Heiskell Award for Innovation in International Education

== Campus ==
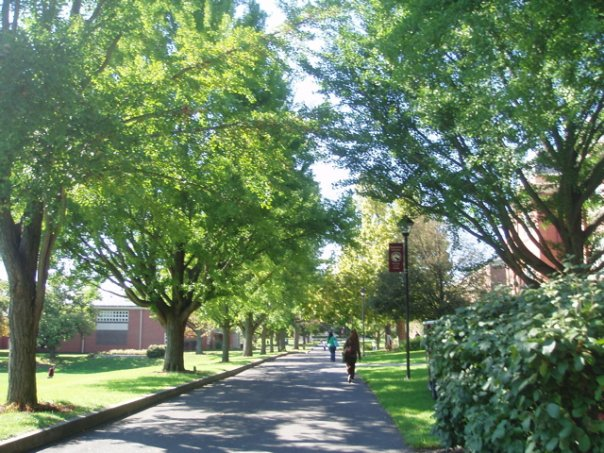
Kurtz Lane

The Susquehanna University campus spans 297 acres (120 ha) in Selinsgrove, Pennsylvania. There are more than 50 buildings on campus, primarily in the style of Georgian architecture. The campus has four buildings that are Leadership in Energy and Environmental Design-certified (LEED) by the U.S. Green Building Council: two residence halls, the Natural Sciences Center, and the Admission House.

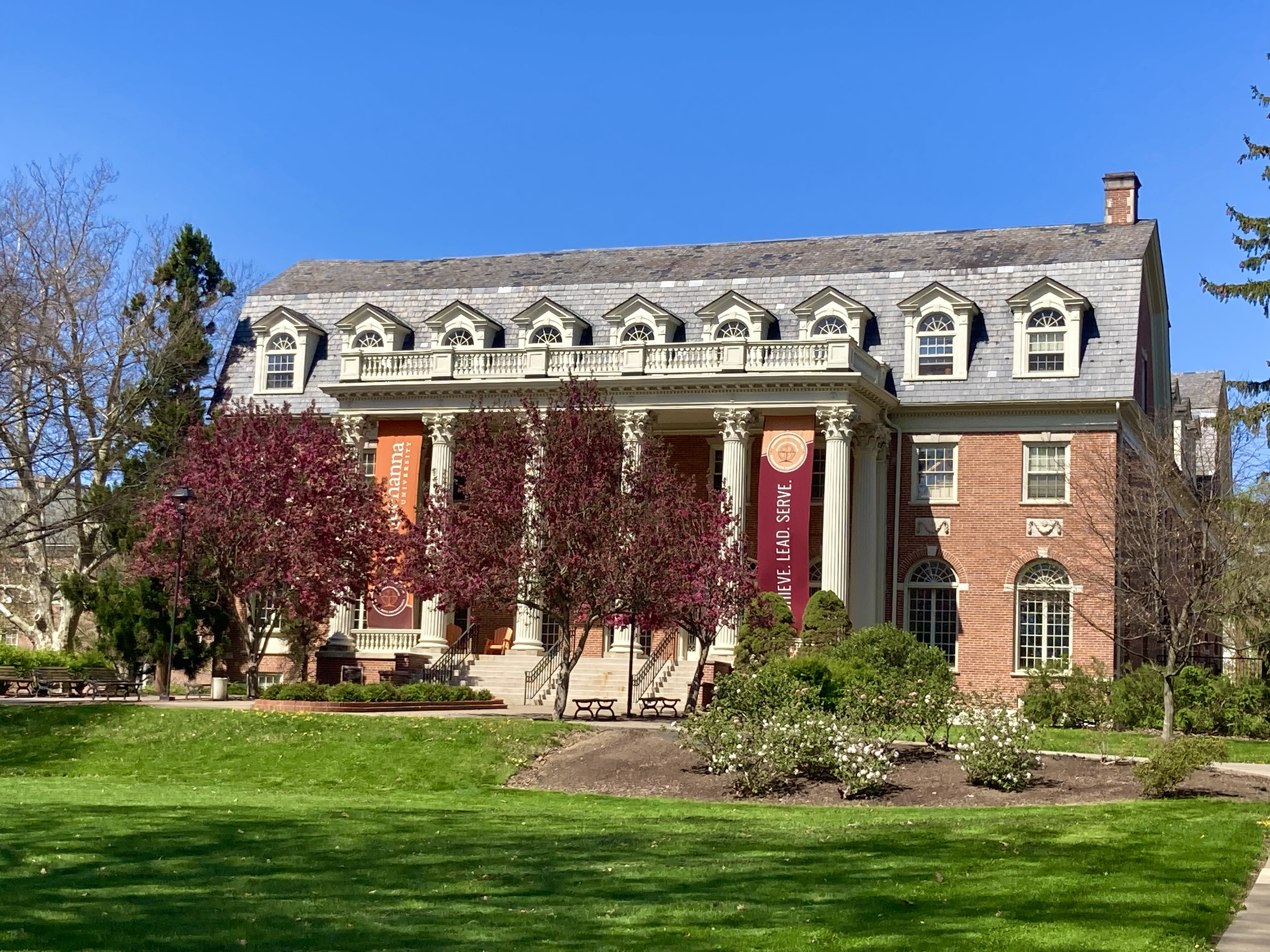
Seibert Hall, listed on the National Register of Historic Places

Students are guaranteed housing all four years, and nearly all students live on campus.

=== Selinsgrove and Seibert halls ===
Selinsgrove Hall is a 3 1/2-story brick structure constructed in 1858 in the Italianate style. The roof features a wooden cupola and the structure was previously featured on the institution's logo. Seibert Hall is a 2 1/2-story brick structure constructed in 1902 in a restrained Colonial Revival style. Both Selinsgrove Hall and Seibert Hall, were listed on the National Register of Historic Places in 1979.

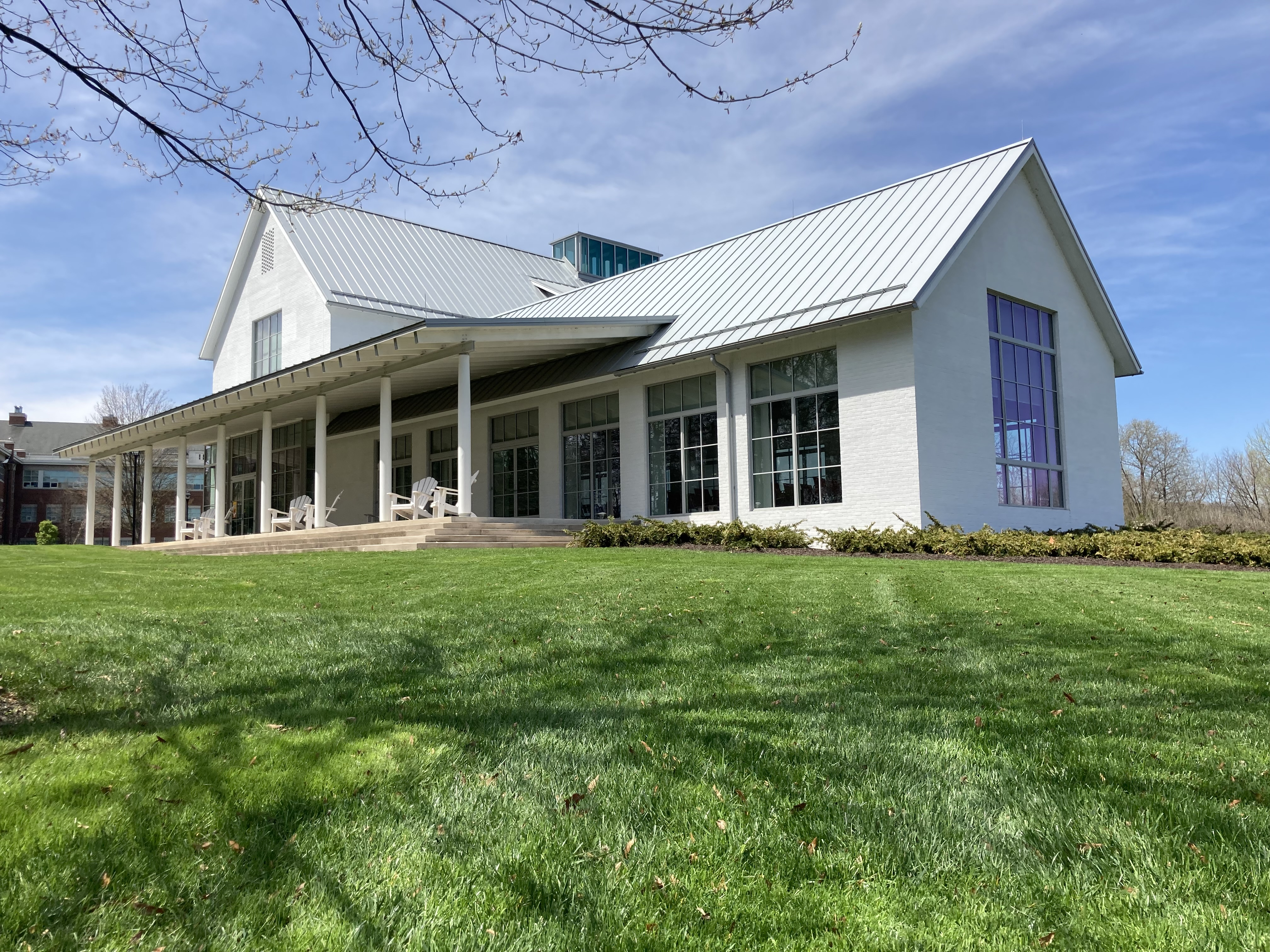
Admission House

=== Admission House ===
In 2017, the institution dedicated a $7 million space to welcome prospective students and families. According to the Susquehanna's website, Admission House was funded through contributions from the board of trustees. Unlike most other buildings on campus, the Admission House has a white facade instead of a naturally red-brick exterior. The 15,500-square-foot (1,440 m^{2}) building was designed by architect Peter Bohlin of Bohlin Cywinski Jackson as a modern take on a barn.

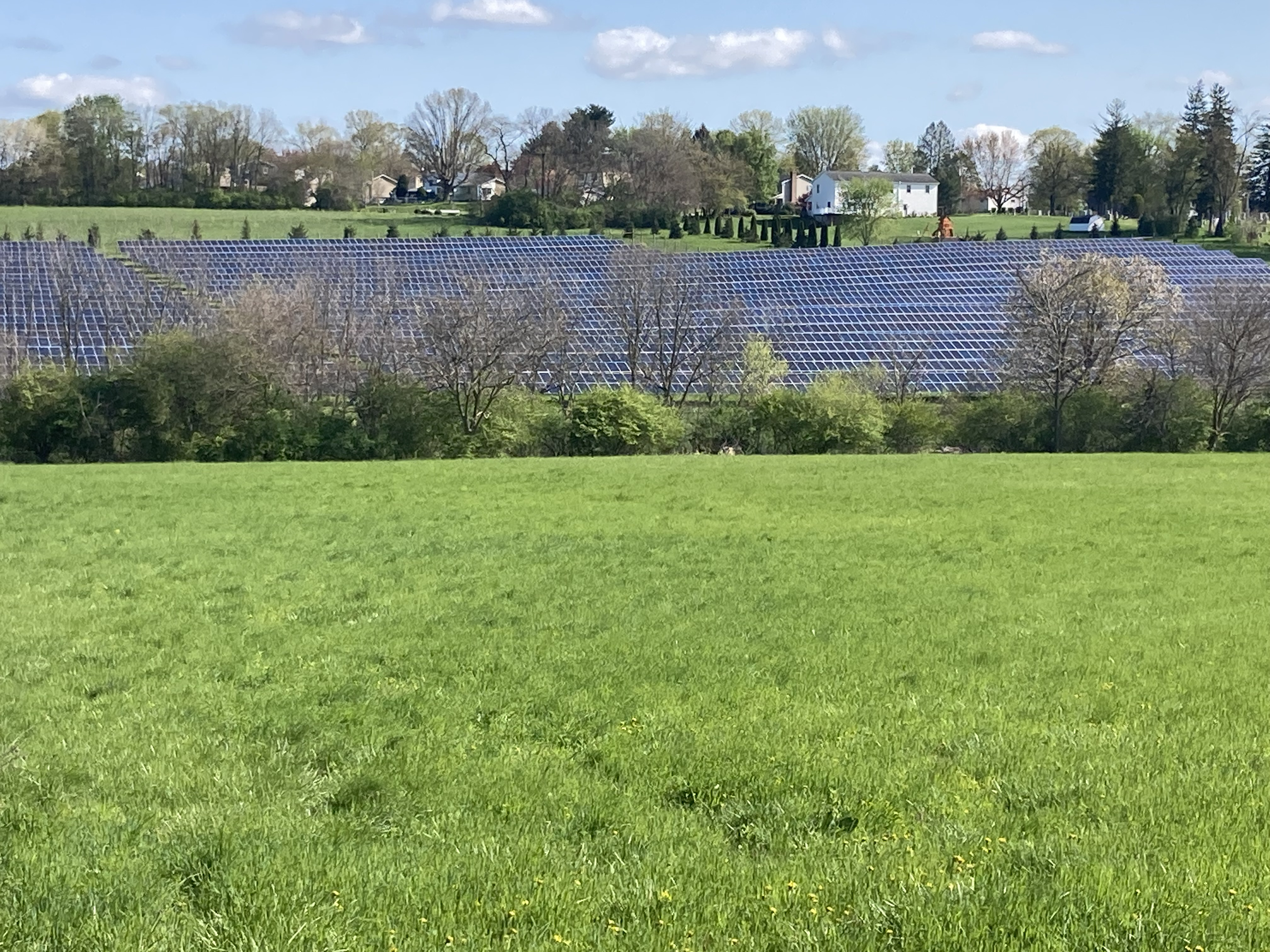
Susquehanna University solar array

=== Natural Sciences Center ===
The Natural Sciences Center is a $32-million academic building that houses Susquehanna’s biology, chemistry, earth and environmental science, neuroscience, ecology, health care studies, and pre-professional programs. It received Silver LEED certification. The 81,000-square-foot (7,500 m^{2}) building was dedicated in 2010.

=== Solar array ===
In 2018, Susquehanna University completed a 14-acre (5.7 ha) solar array with WGL Energy to supply 30 percent of the institution's electricity. At the time, it was the largest college- or university-sponsored solar array in Pennsylvania, and one of the largest solar projects in the Commonwealth. The 12,000-panel array is estimated to produce over 5,300 megawatt hours (MWh) of electricity per year.

== Student life ==
Susquehanna University enrolls approximately 2,200 undergraduate students from 32 states and 30 countries,

Susquehanna University offers more than 150 student clubs and organizations, a variety of honor societies and professional organizations, and 13 Greek organizations, including four National Panhellenic Conference sororities, one National Pan-Hellenic Council sorority, one National Interfraternity Music Council fraternity for women, four Interfraternity Council fraternities, one National Pan-Hellenic Council fraternity, one National Interfraternity Music Council fraternity, and the Alpha Phi Omega co-ed service fraternity.

=== Traditions ===
First-Year Students' Move In Day welcomes first-year students by sending team members to help carry new students' belongings into their dorm rooms. Many faculty and staff assist.

Thanksgiving Dinner is held prior to students leaving for Thanksgiving vacation. Students are served a turkey dinner by faculty, staff, and the president.

Christmas Candlelight Service is held in Weber Auditorium with songs, readings, and prayers.

=== Clubs and organizations ===
==== Academic interest ====
There are a variety of academic clubs and organizations in the fields of business, education, music, sciences, foreign languages, and communications.

==== Publications and media ====
- Writing majors have publication opportunities in the student-run Essay Magazine (for non-fiction) and Rivercraft (for fiction, poetry, and art) in addition to the writing departments' annual magazine, The Susquehanna Review, which seeks submissions from undergraduate writing majors internationally.
- Topic specific student publications include Sanctuary, a literary magazine that features sci-fi and fantasy; Flagship, a publication that features creative work and photography that focuses on students' GO program experiences; and The Squirrel, a student-run newspaper that offers a humorous, critical, and constructive perspective on the news.
- The institution's student-run newspaper, The Quill, covers campus events, activities, and athletics, and provides a forum for the opinions of members of the campus community.

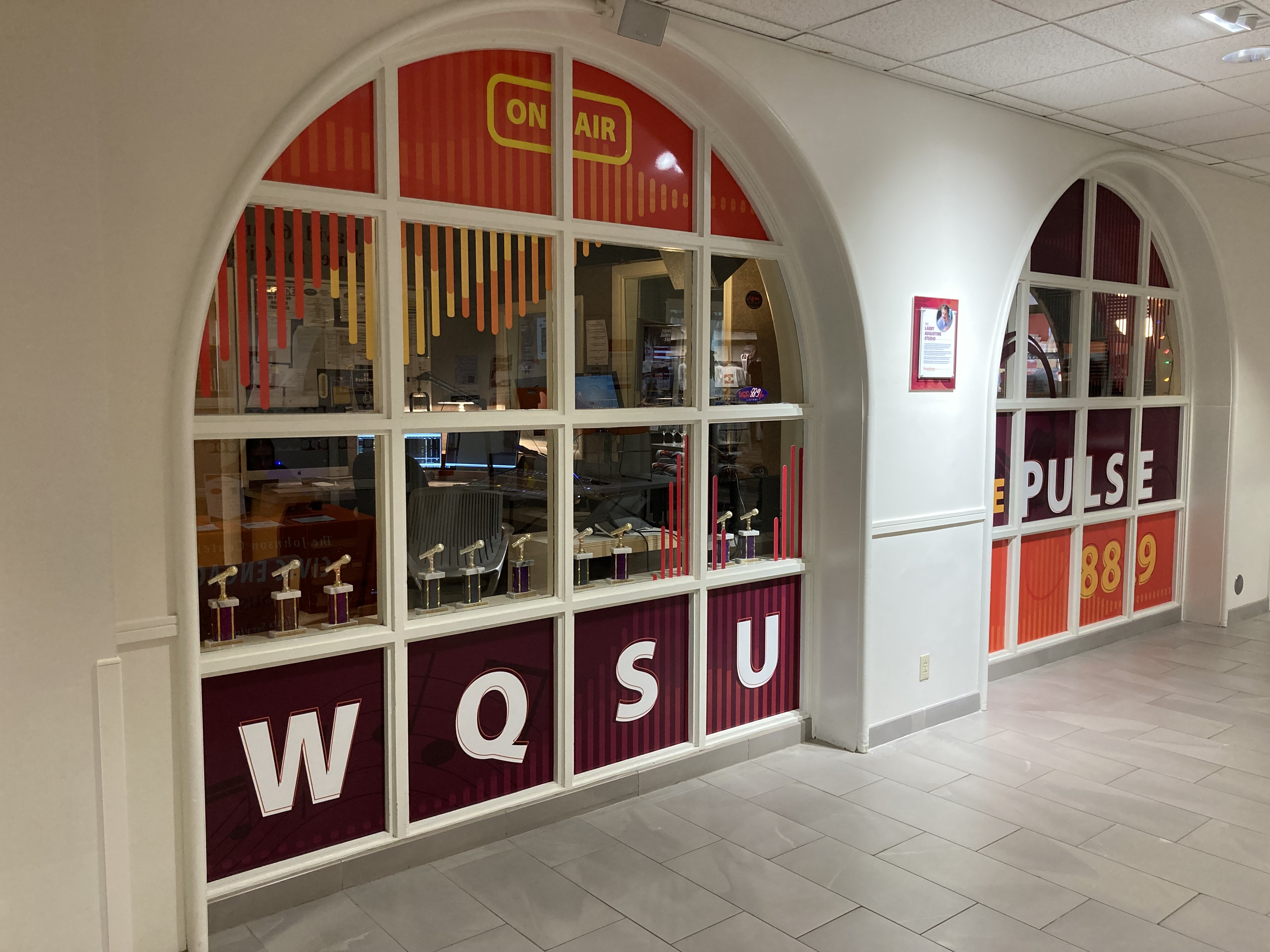
WQSU radio station

- WQSU, The Pulse, is the institution's 10,500-watt radio station, making it the third most powerful college radio station and the tenth most powerful non-commercial radio station in Pennsylvania. Broadcasts can be heard at a 70-mile radius, which is approximately one-third of the state of Pennsylvania. The station is operated by students, faculty and staff as well as community volunteers, and features a wide variety of music and talk programs including regularly scheduled news broadcasts.
- The Lanthorn is Susquehanna's yearbook.

==== Performing arts ====
In addition to the student-run clubs and organizations that focused on music and dance, many ensembles are sponsored and count toward major or elective credit requirements.

The University Choir, Chorale, and Chamber Singers are the three vocal performance groups open to all students by audition, and the instrumental offerings (many of which are also open to all students through an audition process) range from small ensembles to pep bands to the University Symphonic Band.

==== Religious life ====
There are 11 religious and spiritual organizations at Susquehanna. In addition, students as well as the general public have the opportunity to attend Lutheran services held Sunday mornings on campus.

== Athletics ==
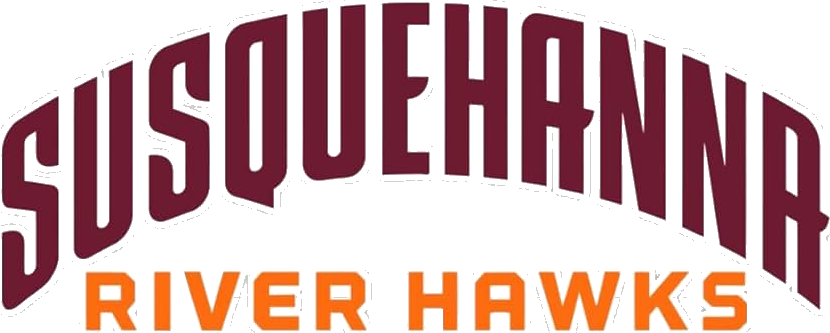
Susquehanna River Hawks wordmark

Susquehanna competes in 23 varsity sports in Division III of the NCAA. All sports compete as part of the Landmark Conference with other Northeastern colleges. The university announced it is adding a women's flag football team in 2028.

Susquehanna is also a member of the All-Atlantic Region Track & Field Conference. Cheerleading is Susquehanna's 24th varsity team.

The athletics complex includes a 51,000-square-foot (4,700 m^{2}) field house, 3,500-seat Amos Alonzo Stagg Field at Doug Arthur Stadium, Douglas Arthur '49 Field, Clyde H. Jacobs Fitness Center, 1,100-seat Orlando W. Houts Gymnasium, a natatorium with a 25-yard swimming and diving pool, tennis courts, racquetball courts, and Sassafras Softball Field and a multipurpose field.

Men's sports	Women's sports
Baseball	Basketball
Basketball	Cross Country
Cross Country	Field Hockey
Football	Flag Football (2028)^{†}
Golf	Golf
Lacrosse	Lacrosse
Soccer	Soccer
Swimming	Softball
Tennis	Swimming
Track and Field^{††}	Tennis
	Track and Field^{††}
	Volleyball
† – Flag football coming 2028. †† – Track and field includes both indoor and outdoor.

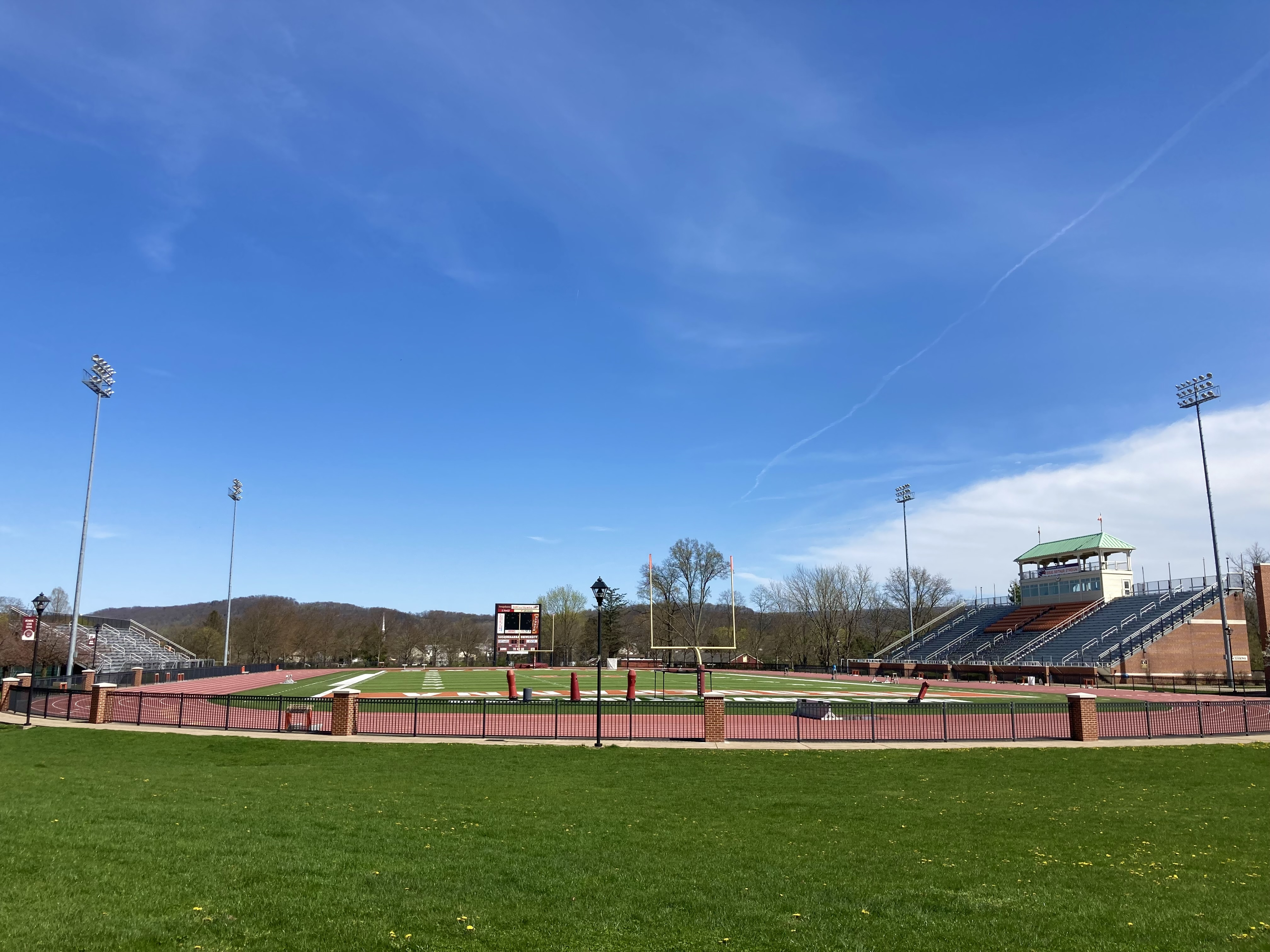
Stagg Field at Arthur Stadium for football, and track and field

In 2022, Susquehanna won the Landmark Conference President's Trophy for the best overall athletics program, which is based on conference regular-season and postseason competition. It was the fifth time Susquehanna won the trophy, tying it with Moravian University, as one of two conference teams to most often win the trophy since it was created in 2008.

The football team competes in two annual trophy contests. The Goal Post Trophy goes to the winner of the annual football game with rival Juniata College. Susquehanna football also plays Lycoming College for The Stagg Hat Trophy.

In October 2015, Susquehanna University's board of trustees elected to replace the Crusaders nickname and mascot. On April 2, 2016, the University announced River Hawks as the new nickname. “Benny the Hawk” was introduced on October 29, 2016 as the new mascot.

== Notable alumni ==
- Roger Blough - former chairman and CEO of U.S. Steel
- Claude A. Buss - diplomat and professor at University of Southern California and Stanford University
- Julie S. Cabus - law enforcement
- Richard Caruso - founder and chairman of Integra Life Sciences
- David A. Day - longest-serving Lutheran missionary in Liberia
- Tommy Dempsey - head men's basketball coach, Binghamton University
- Richard Dorman - president of Westminster College
- Puella Dornblaser - temperance activist
- Jay Feaster – former general manager of the Calgary Flames, current executive director of Community Hockey Development for the Tampa Bay Lightning
- Benjamin K. Focht - member of the U.S. House of Representatives from Pennsylvania, the Pennsylvania House of Representatives, and the Pennsylvania State Senate
- H. B. Galbraith - former head football coach at University of Arizona
- Chuck Gillin - bishop of the Reformed Episcopal Church
- Adam Harris - representative for the 82nd District, Pennsylvania House of Representatives, 2003–2018
- James Jordan - writer and conductor
- Dick Kauffman - professional baseball player
- David T. Little - American composer and drummer
- Camilla Luddington - actress
- Jackie McKeever - Tony Award-nominated singer and actress
- Harold Norman Moldenke - botanist and taxonomist
- Bob Mosher - television and radio scriptwriter
- Bill Muir - former American football coach
- Paul Musser - professional baseball player
- Merle Phillips - representative for the 108th District, Pennsylvania House of Representatives, 1980–2010
- Ashley L. Shade - director of research at the Institute of Ecology and the Environment within Le Centre National de la Recherche Scientifique
- John Strangfeld - former chairman and CEO of Prudential Financial

== Notable faculty and administration ==
- Tom Bailey - Author, editor, and former creative writing professor
- Rick Benjamin - Adjunct professor of music at Susquehanna University and conductor of Paragon Ragtime Orchestra
- Gary Brown - Former professional football player and former offensive coordinator of Susquehanna University football team
- Scot Dapp - Former head baseball coach at Susquehanna University
- Jim Garrett - Former head football coach at Susquehanna University, former college football player, NFL player and assistant coach/scout.
- Jonathan D. Green - President of Susquehanna 2017-present
- Jim Hazlett - Former head baseball and football coach
- Ralph Mitterling - Former head football coach at Susquehanna University
- Matthew Neill Null - Writer, creative writing professor
- Tom Perkovich - Former head football coach
- Chris Pincince - Head football coach
- William M. "Rocky" Rees - Former head football coach at Susquehanna University
- Glen Retief - South African author and English and creative writing professor
- Amos Alonzo Stagg - Former co-head football coach with his son at Susquehanna University
- Amos Alonzo Stagg Jr. - Former head football and basketball coach at Susquehanna University
- Edgar Wingard - Former head football coach at Susquehanna University
