= WQSU =

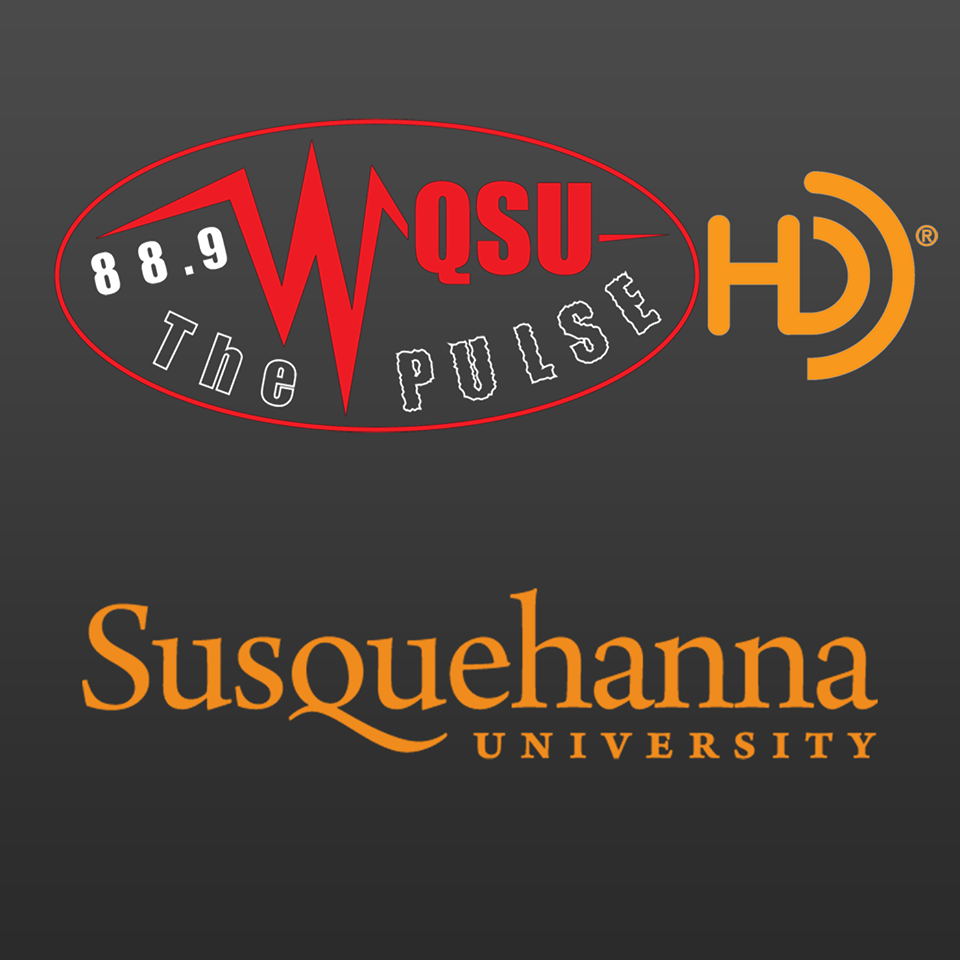
- Selinsgrove, Pennsylvania; United States
- Broadcast area: Sunbury-Selinsgrove-Lewisburg, PA
- Frequency: 88.9 MHz (HD Radio)
- Branding: The Pulse

Programming
- Format: College radio

Ownership
- Owner: Susquehanna University

History
- First air date: 1967

Technical information
- Licensing authority: FCC
- Facility ID: 64184
- Class: B
- ERP: 10,500 watts
- HAAT: 203.4 meters (667 ft)
- Transmitter coordinates: 40°57′12.3″N 76°45′3.9″W

Links
- Public license information: Public file; LMS
- Website: wqsu.fm

WQSU (88.9 FM, "The Pulse") is a non-commercial, college radio station that is licensed to serve Selinsgrove, Pennsylvania. The station is owned and operated by Susquehanna University and is staffed by students and faculty of the university as well as community volunteers.

It is run under the supervision of the university's Department of Communications, having been developed as an educational facility. At 10,500 watts, WQSU is the most powerful student-run college FM radio station in Pennsylvania, and as such it serves approximately one-third of the state with a variety of music, news, information, public affairs, and sports programming, 365 days a year. Its broadcast tower is located east of Lewisburg.

The operation of WQSU-FM serves two separate and distinct purposes. The first is to serve the public interest as mandated by the Federal Communications Commission, and the second is to serve Susquehanna University in its educational mission by training students in various forms of broadcasting principles and operations, serving as a media outlet for Susquehanna University. Programming from Monday to Friday consists of modern and alternative rock, although there are specialty shows, including numerous music genres including classic rock. Saturday programming consists of country and bluegrass as well as Willow Crossing. Sundays offer varied specialty programs, including blues, techno, classical, the Grateful Dead, and Susquehanna University's church service. WQSU also regularly airs a wide variety of news and sports coverage.

During the school year, the station is on-air from 9 a.m. until 2 a.m. During school breaks, including the summer, the station is on-air from noon until 2 a.m. When the station is not programming live from its studios, it rebroadcasts WVIA-FM programming, which includes classical music and some National Public Radio shows including Morning Edition, All Things Considered and Car Talk. The station's on-air schedule is available on the Radio FX App.

== History ==
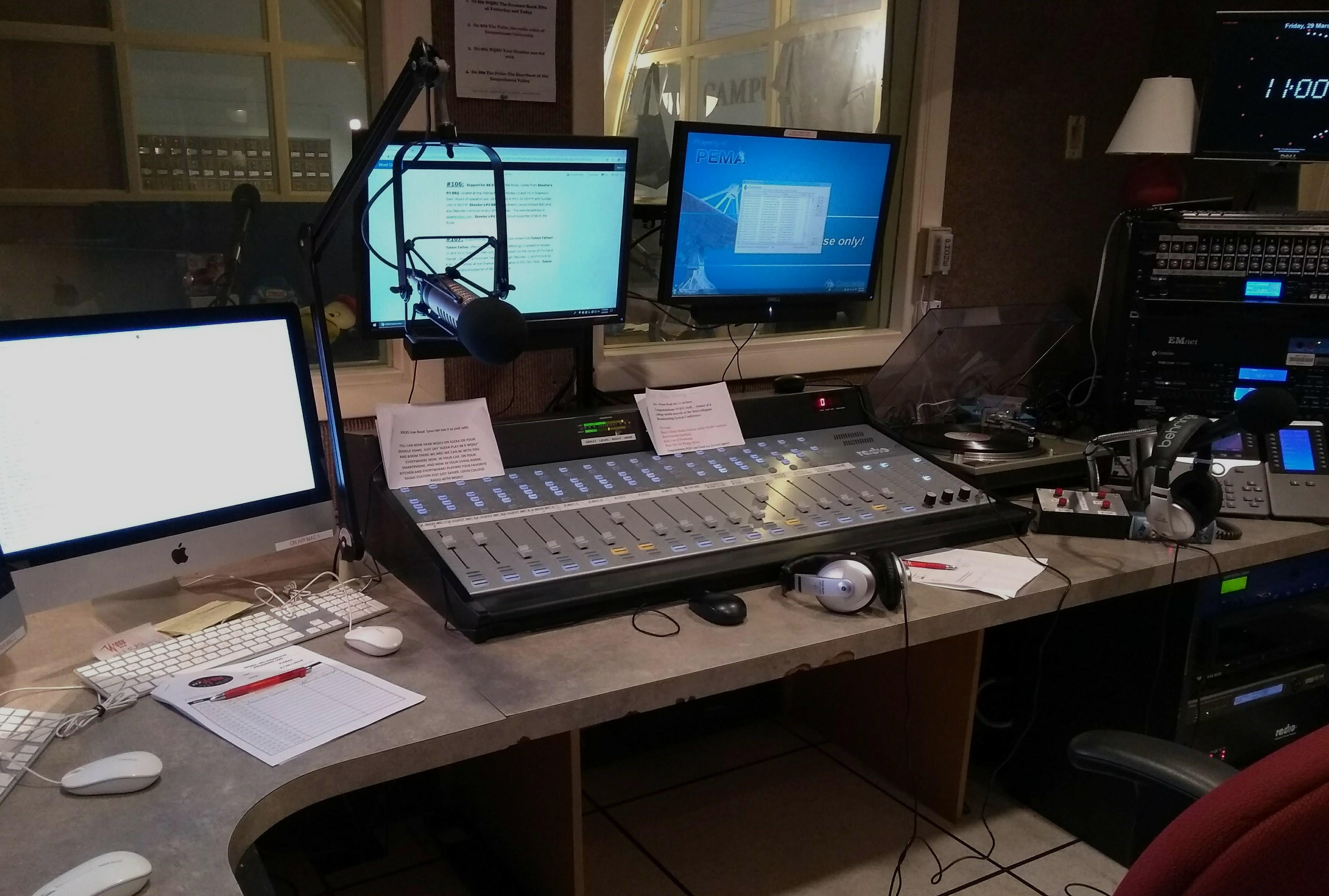
Inside the WQSU broadcasting room, where the on-air DJ's play their music and programs

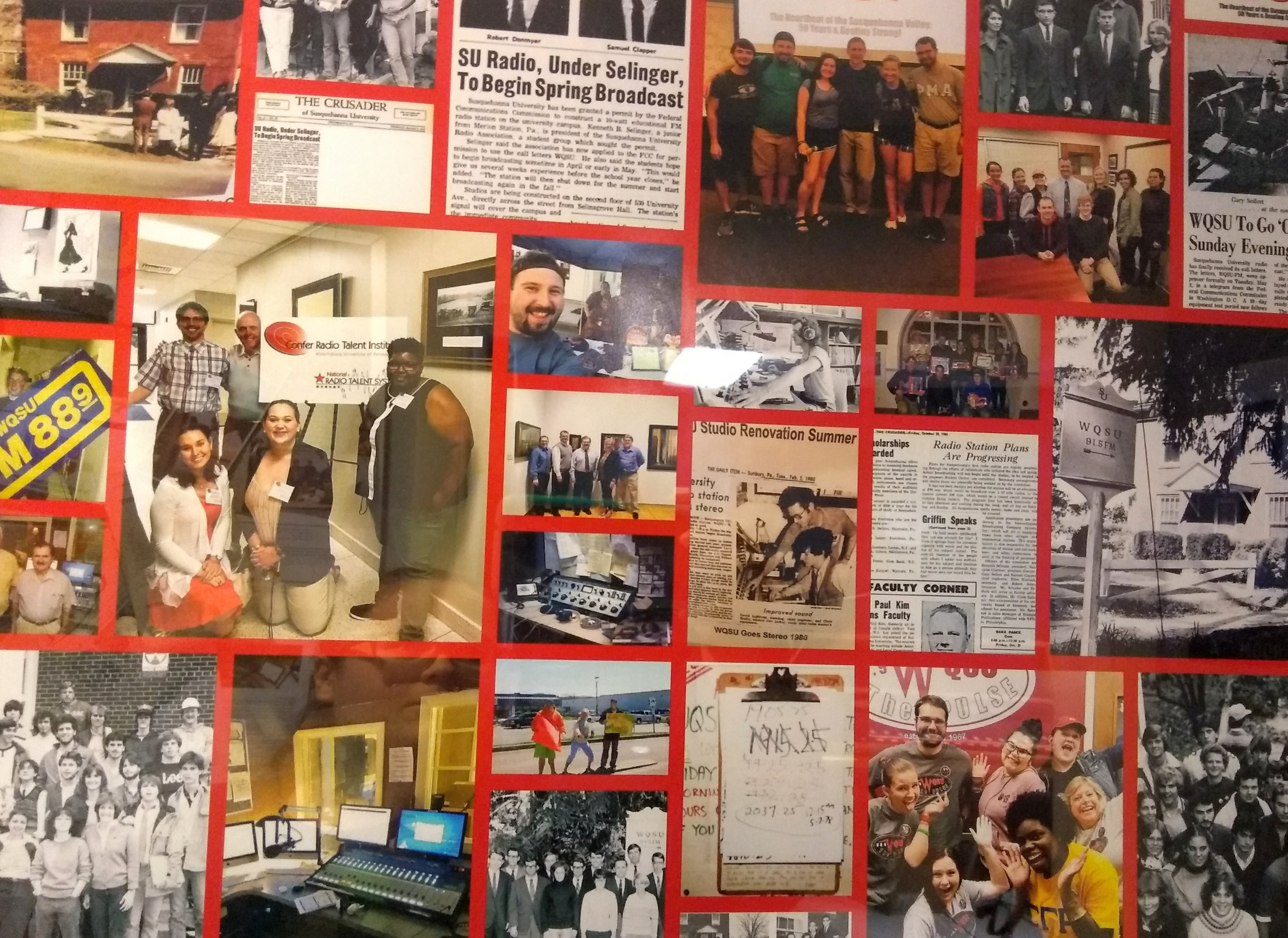
A collage of WQSU events, alumni and history hung in the hall of the WQSU station

In 1961, WQSU began as a club named "The Radio Association" pioneered by Ken Selinger.

In 1967, Triangle Publications of Philadelphia executive Clyde Spitzer helps the Radio Association progress by donating equipment.

On May 14, 1967, WQSU was assigned their call letters by the Federal Communications Commission and aired for the first time at 91.5 MHz with a 10-watt transmitter.

On March 20, 1975, WQSU increased its broadcast power from 10 watts to 5,600 watts and changed frequencies from 91.5 MHz to its current frequency of 88.9 MHz.

On February 1, 1980, WQSU began broadcasting in stereo.

In January 1983, WQSU increased its broadcast power from 5600 watts to 12,000 watts.

On March 15, 1985, WQSU moved from its original home at 530 University Avenue to the Degenstein Campus Center at Susquehanna University.

On November 22, 2013 at 10 AM, WQSU began broadcasting in HD. WQSU was the 76th radio station in Pennsylvania to begin broadcasting in HD, and the 5th college radio station in Pennsylvania to begin broadcasting in HD.

In 2016, WQSU station's general manager since 1967, Larry Augustine, retired his position to Dawn Marie Benfer.

On March 27, 2017, the FCC granted Susquehanna University a construction permit to reduce the station's ERP from 12,000 watts to 10,500 watts. The FCC granted the station a new license with the reduced ERP on March 18, 2019.

On October 30, 2017, WQSU celebrated its 50 years of being on air.

=== Willow Crossing ===
Willow Crossing is a WQSU specialty show that began in the 1980s and has survived as a mainstay for over 30 years. The creator of the drama show, Jack Guyot Smith, also acts as the performer.

== Awards ==
In 2008, WQSU won the Pennsylvania Association of Broadcasters (PAB) award for Outstanding Public Service Announcement. The PSA was written and produced by Jeff Gorcyca.

On March 27, 2010, WQSU was awarded second place in the Radio C Sports Play-By-Play category at the Pennsylvania AP News awards in Grantville, Pa. for the Feb. 28, 2009 broadcasting of the Landmark Conference Men's Basketball Championship game.

In 2018, WQSU won two Pennsylvania Association of Broadcasters (PAB) awards:

- WQSU 50 Years of College Radio, WQSU team, Judge Merit Award, and
- WQSU River Hawks Football, Outstanding Radio Coverage of a Local Sporting Event.

On February 20, 2019, WQSU became the first university radio station in Pennsylvania to have won a Pennsylvania Association of Broadcasters Excellence in Broadcasting award. After its 18th Annual Toys for Tots drive, WQSU was awarded Outstanding Station Sponsored Event.

WQSU won four golden microphone awards, and nominated for five other awards, from the Intercollegiate Broadcasting System on March 7, 2019 in N.Y.:

- Best College Radio Station Under 10k Students,
- Best Station Facilities,
- Best Use of Facebook and,
- Best On Air Pledge Drive.

== Notable alumni ==
Alumni
Alumni	Years In Station	Notable Successes
Larry Augustine	1967-2016	Augustine was the General Manager of WQSU for 50 years.
Jack Burns	1988–Present	In 2010 Burns was the only media member to be inducted into the SU Sports Hall of Fame. Burns has been the play-by-play broadcaster for over 300 football games and 600 basketball games.
