= Richard Dorman (academic administrator) =

Richard Dorman was the 14th President of Westminster College, a liberal arts college in New Wilmington, Pennsylvania.

== Education ==
Dorman obtained an undergraduate degree in music education from Susquehanna University, and a master's in counseling/college student personnel services, and then a doctorate of higher education administration from The Pennsylvania State University.

== Career ==
Dorman's first job was at Red Lion Senior High School in Pennsylvania where he was the director of choral activities. He has also served as director of marketing for Prestige Expositions in Ridgewood, New Jersey, as an executive with the Penn State Alumni Association, assistant vice president for development at the University of Louisville, and as vice president for institutional advancement at Otterbein College. He became President of Westminster on July 1, 2008, succeeding former President Thomas Williamson.

In May 2015, Dr. Dorman announced that he would leave his position as president at the end of the 2015–16 academic year in order to be closer to family and to pursue writing and academic research on higher education. During his term, he raised over $52 million in gifts and pledges, completed a renovation of the college's largest classroom building, created new Fine Arts studio and classroom space, and completed the construction of the Berlin Village Townhouse complex. He also led Westminster College to be named by Smart Asset, Inc. the "#1 Best Value of All Colleges and Universities in Pennsylvania."

== Personal ==
Dorman is a member and elder in the Presbyterian Church, having served as president of the national Association of Presbyterian Colleges and Universities (APCU). He and his wife Beverly have two children.

Additionally, he co-authored the higher education management book "Leadership and Governance in Higher Education" with Robert Hendrickson, Jason Lane, and James T. Harris.
