= American Society for Microbiology =

Scholarly society focused on microbiology

ASM
- Formation: 1899
- Type: Learned society, Nonprofit
- Field: Microbiology
- Members: 30,000
- Website: asm.org
- Formerly called: Society of American Bacteriologists, American Society for Microbiology

ASM is a professional organization for scientists, educators, and professionals who promote and advance the microbial sciences around the world. ASM publishes a variety of scientific journals, textbooks, and other educational materials related to microbiology and infectious diseases. The organization also convenes annual meetings, as well as organizes workshops and professional development opportunities for its members.

== History ==
ASM was founded in 1899 under the name the "Society of American Bacteriologists." In December 1960, it was renamed the "American Society for Microbiology.". In June of 2026, it was again renamed "ASM" to reflect its global reach.

== Mission ==
ASM is an international organization dedicated to the study and advancement of the microbial sciences for addressing challenges affecting the world. Founded in 1899, the organization supports researchers, educators, clinicians, and other professionals through scientific meetings, publications, professional development programs, and public engagement activities. Its areas of focus include topics such as climate change, antimicrobial resistance, industrial microbiology, and basic and applied microbiology. ASM publishes scientific journals and other scholarly resources and participates in activities related to science policy, research communication, and open science.

== Strategic Roadmap ==
ASM's strategic roadmap, launched in 2025, outlines the organization's priorities for advancing microbial sciences and supporting scientific engagement among scientists and stakeholders worldwide. The roadmap emphasizes the role of microorganisms in addressing challenges related to human health, environmental sustainability, and other issues affecting life on Earth.

As part of this effort, ASM established 3 scientific units focused on distinct areas of the microbial sciences:

- ASM Health: ASM Health focuses on leveraging the microbial sciences to protect public health, promote wellness, and support One Health. The unit brings together researchers, clinicians, industry representatives, policymakers, and community organizations to facilitate scientific exchange and the translation of research findings into health-related advancements.
- ASM Applied and Environmental Microbiology: The ASM Applied and Environmental Microbiology connects and promotes the fields of microbiology related to the environment and ecology. Focus areas of the unit include microbial ecology, biofuels, synthetic biology, and environmental microbiology, among other sub-disciplines.
- ASM Mechanism Discovery: ASM Mechanism Discovery focuses on fundamental research into microorganisms and their interactions. Its scope includes microbial physiology, metabolism, genetics, evolution, and other biological processes that contribute to understanding the mechanisms underlying microbial life.

== Membership ==
ASM brings together scientists, educators, clinicians, students, and professionals from around the globe to advance discovery and share knowledge.

An ASM Membership provides access to benefits designed to support members' science, careers, and communities. Benefits include:

- Savings and discounts on ASM’s conferences, webinars, and professional development courses.
- Opportunities to connect globally with microbiologists and stay aware of advancements in the field.
- Discounted rates for publishing in ASM’s peer-reviewed journals.
- Access to ASM's Microbiology Careers Salary Survey.
- Grants, awards, and mentorship programs.

== Meetings ==
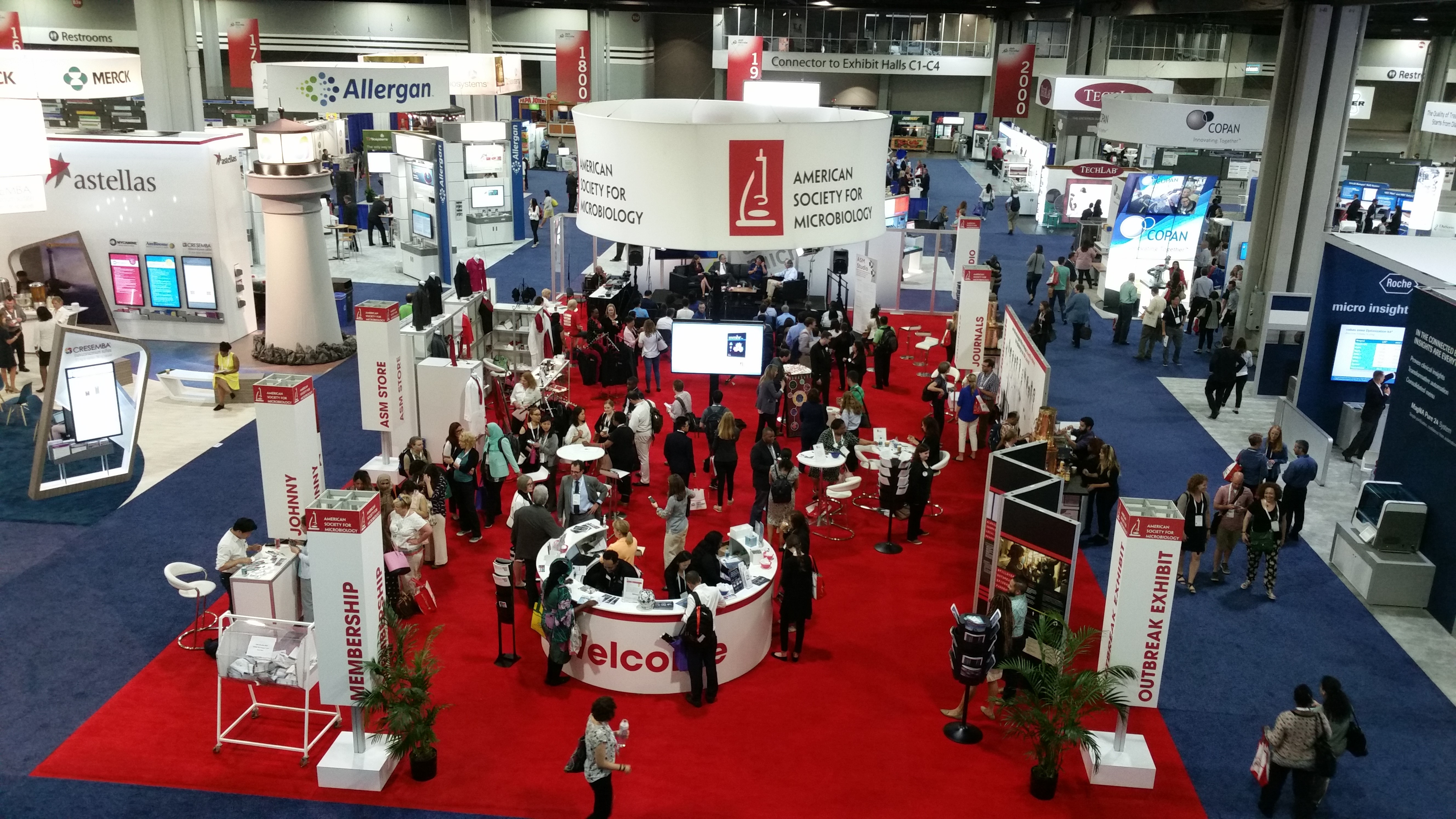
ASM Microbe 2018 meeting in Atlanta

ASM hosts meetings and conferences, including the annual meeting ASM Microbe, that provide forums to explore microbiology topics.

ASM Microbe, a combination of what was formerly the ASM General Meeting and the Interscience Conference on Antimicrobial Agents and Chemotherapy (ICAAC), is organized into 3 co-convening meetings: ASM Health, ASM Applied and Environmental Microbiology, and ASM Mechanism Discovery. Together, the meetings provide forums for the presentation of research and scientific exchange across the microbial sciences, as well as opportunities for cross-disciplinary collaboration.

Other ASM meetings and conferences cater to narrower audiences, including:

- ASMCUE (ASM Conference for Undergraduate Educators).
- ABRCMS is ASM's conference for multidisciplinary science and workforce development. For 25 years, ABRCMS has been the nation's largest multidisciplinary scientific conference for supporting all communities in STEM, including those historically excluded. At ABRCMS, scientists come together to share research positioned to meet today’s challenges and shape tomorrow’s future. That shared purpose depends on emerging scientists from every background showing up with passion and purpose. That's why we are proud to foster a welcoming, supportive community that empowers innovation for all.
- The Interdisciplinary Meeting on Antimicrobial Resistance and Innovation (IMARI) brings together scientists, innovators and cross-sector leaders to address the global challenge of antimicrobial resistance. Over three days, participants will explore the full innovation pipeline—from emerging resistance mechanisms to next-generation therapeutics and clinical translation—while advancing cutting-edge science and building powerful new collaborations.
- The ASM Bioinformatics, Genomics and Big Data Conference (ASM BIG)—formerly ASM NGS—brings together scientists, bioinformaticians and data experts to explore how genomics, bioinformatics and large-scale data analysis are transforming the microbial sciences.

== Publications ==
ASM publishes 17 peer-reviewed journals covering the full spectrum of the microbial sciences. Its portfolio includes fully open access (OA) journals as well as 6 journals published under the Subscribe to Open (S2O) model.

ASM's Primary Research Journals:

- Antimicrobial Agents and Chemotherapy (S2O)
- Applied and Environmental Microbiology (S2O)
- ASM Animal Microbiology (OA)
- ASM Case Reports (OA)
- ASM Food Microbiology (OA)
- Infection and Immunity (S2O)
- Journal of Bacteriology (S2O)
- Journal of Clinical Microbiology (S2O)
- Journal of Microbiology & Biology Education (OA)
- Journal of Virology (S2O)
- mBio (OA)
- Microbiology Resource Announcements (OA)
- Microbiology Spectrum (OA)
- mSphere (OA)
- mSystems (OA)

Review Journals:

- Clinical Microbiology Reviews
- Microbiology and Molecular Biology Reviews

The society also publishes Microcosm, a quarterly news magazine for members. Through its publishing arm ASM Press, ASM publishes books covering diverse topics. Wiley is co-publisher and distributor of the ASM Press books and ebooks.

== American Academy of Microbiology ==
The American Academy of Microbiology (AAM) is the honorific leadership group within the American Society of Microbiology, a professional organization for microbiologists. The academy is currently composed of over 2,600 Fellows.

The mission of the academy is to "recognize outstanding contributions provided by microbiologists and to provide microbiological expertise to both the wider scientific community and the public." Activities of the academy include electing new members, convening colloquia, and managing the ASM Awards and Prize program. Academy leadership is divided into four groups: the Academy Governors, the Academy Leadership Nominating Subcommittee, the Subcommittee on Awards, and the Subcommittee on Elections.

=== Origins ===
The AAM was first proposed in 1956. The original organization was dissolved in 1970, when new bylaws were accepted.

=== Members ===
The AAM elects a new class each year. As of 2020, each year 65 new members are elected. That number has fluctuated historically to as many as 110. Membership is not exclusive to American residents, and indeed 19% of members currently live outside the U.S. The 2021 class of Fellows included representatives of 11 countries, including France.

In 2021, there were 150 nominations, and 130 nominations the following year. The call for nominations begins in August. Only current AAM fellows can nominate a new fellow, and that nomination must be supported by at least two other AAM fellows. Candidates cannot apply for fellowship directly, but can reach out to current fellows to seek nomination. The nomination deadline is in October. The Sub-committee of Elections and the Academy Governors, which are composed of AAM members elected by the entire AAM membership, then vote to approve of the nominations. Members of the AAM are elected through an annual peer-reviewed process based on their records of scientific achievements that have advanced microbiology. The academy administers ASM scientific achievement awards that honor important contributions to basic and applied research, microbiology education, and scientific and professional leadership. There is no limit to the number of times a person can be nominated, nor an age limit for nomination. Notable academy members include Anthony Fauci (former director of the National Institute for Allergies and Infectious Disease) and Rita Colwell (former director of the National Science Foundation).

=== Activities ===
The AAM holds colloquia, sometimes in conjunction with other scientific societies, on topics pertinent to public interests and the expertises of its members. Topics include climate change, One Health, and clinical diagnostics. Reports from the colloquia are made publicly available.

In addition to communicating via colloquium reports, mBio, a journal launched by ASM in 2009, offers an ‘AAM track’ where AAM members are allowed to submit one manuscript per year. Fellows are required to submit two reviews per submission, make modifications that address the reviewers’ comments, then submit the revised version to the mBio editors. However, submission does not guarantee acceptance.

The AAM also selects an Honorary Diversity Lecturer. This award, aimed to attract more under-represented minorities to the field, is given to a mid-to-senior level scientist who is both highly accomplished and an "outstanding" speaker.

=== American College of Microbiology ===
The American College of Microbiology (ACM) certified microbiologists and immunologists and provided accreditation of postdoctoral training programs.

- The American Board of Medical Microbiology (ABMM) certified doctoral-level microbiologists.
- The American Board of Medical Laboratory Immunology (ABMLI) certified doctoral-level immunologists.
- The National Registry of Certified Microbiologists (NRCM) certified microbiologists at the prebaccalaureate/baccalaureate, master's, and doctoral levels in biological safety; food; and pharmaceutical and medical device. Four certifications were offered with a Registered Microbiologist (RM) and Specialist Microbiologist(SM). The exams were last offered in April 2018 with applicants being directed to ASCP (M) an SM for the medical microbiology certification ABSA International RBP and CBSP for biosafety .
  - SM: Biological Safety
  - SM: Pharmaceutical and Medical Device
  - RM: Pharmaceutical and Medical Device
  - RM: Food Safety and Quality

== Public outreach ==
ASM produces eight podcasts, including This Week in Microbiology, This Week in Virology, and This Week in Parasitism, hosted by Vincent Racaniello. Mundo de los Microbios hosted by Gary Toranzos, is ASM's weekly Spanish-language podcast. Meet the Microbiologist is a podcast hosted by Julie Wolf, Ph.D., that showcases the people behind the scientific discoveries in various cutting-edge areas of the microbial sciences.

== Advocacy ==
ASM empowers members to advocate for the highest standards in scientific practice and provides members opportunities to advocate for evidence-based scientific policy.

In 2011, ASM made a concerted effort to address the lack of visibility of its policy arm, specifically in promoting the interests of clinical microbiologists. The Public and Scientific Affairs Board Professional Affairs Committee and Committee on Laboratory Practices was active in influencing policy decisions through Congress, the Clinical Laboratory Coalition, the FDA, and the CDC.

ASM restructured its advocacy program to enhance its effectiveness in Washington, D.C., and its expansion to the Branches and various local communities. In 2018, ASM engaged members of Congress and issued statements in conjunction with Congressional hearings focusing on recent outbreaks of vaccine-preventable diseases like the measles. In 2017 and 2018, ASM played a leading role, working with coalition partners, to raise the federal budget caps and advance funding for science and public health agencies like the National Institutes of Health, National Science Foundation, National Institute for Food and Agriculture at the USDA and the Centers for Disease Control and Prevention. ASM members sent nearly 2,000 messages to Members of Congress in support of increased science funding. Noteworthy is the appreciation of ASM by CDC, since raising the caps made specifically possible the construction of the new biocontainment lab.

In 2018, ASM advocated successfully for establishing PACCARB (President's Advisory Council for Combatting Antibiotic Resistance Bacteria) into the law (from an Obama administration Executive Order), by including language in the Pandemic and All-Hazards Preparedness and Advancing Innovation Act. ASM convened a meeting with more than 20 stakeholder groups to discuss a collective path forward for federally-focused advocacy in support of microbiome research.

== See also ==
- Microbial art
- MicrobeLibrary
- Society for General Microbiology
- Small things considered, science blog dedicated to microbial activities
