= Earth's mantle =

Layer of silicate rock

The internal structure of Earth

Earth's mantle is a layer of silicate rock between the crust and the outer core. It has a mass of 4.01×10^{24} kg (8.84×10^{24} lb) and makes up 67% of the mass of Earth. It has a thickness of 2,900 kilometers (1,800 mi) making up about 46% of Earth's radius and 84% of Earth's volume. It is predominantly solid but, on geologic time scales, it behaves as a viscous fluid, sometimes described as having the consistency of caramel. Partial melting of the mantle at mid-ocean ridges produces oceanic crust, and partial melting of the mantle at subduction zones produces continental crust.

== Structure ==
=== Rheology ===
Earth's upper mantle is divided into two major rheological layers: the rigid lithospheric mantle (the uppermost mantle), and the more ductile asthenosphere, separated by the lithosphere-asthenosphere boundary. The lithosphere (that is, the lithospheric mantle and the overlying crust) makes up tectonic plates, which move over the asthenosphere. Below the asthenosphere, the mantle is again relatively rigid. Ocean crust lithosphere has a thickness of around 100 km (62 mi), whereas continental crust lithosphere generally has a thickness of 150–200 km (93–124 mi).

The Earth's mantle is divided into three major layers defined by sudden changes in seismic velocity:

- the upper mantle (starting at the Moho, or base of the crust around 7 to 35 km [4.3 to 21.7 mi] downward to 410 km [250 mi])
- the transition zone (approximately 410–660 km [250–410 mi]), in which wadsleyite (≈ 410–520 km [250–320 mi]) and ringwoodite (≈ 525–660 km [326–410 mi]) are stable
- the lower mantle (approximately 660–2,891 km [410–1,796 mi]), in which bridgmanite (≈ 660–2,685 km [410–1,668 mi]) and post-perovskite (≈ 2,685–2,891 km [1,668–1,796 mi]) are stable

The lower ~200 km of the lower mantle constitutes the D" region (D-double-prime), a region with anomalous seismic properties. This region also contains large low-shear-velocity provinces and ultra low velocity zones.

=== Mineralogical structure ===
The top of the mantle is defined by a sudden increase in seismic velocity, which was first noted by Andrija Mohorovičić in 1909; this boundary is now referred to as the Mohorovičić discontinuity or "Moho".

The upper mantle is dominantly peridotite, composed primarily of variable proportions of the minerals olivine, clinopyroxene, orthopyroxene, and an aluminous phase. The aluminous phase is plagioclase in the uppermost mantle, then spinel, and then garnet below ~100 km (62 mi). Gradually through the upper mantle, pyroxenes become less stable and transform into majoritic garnet.

Mineral transformations in the mantle

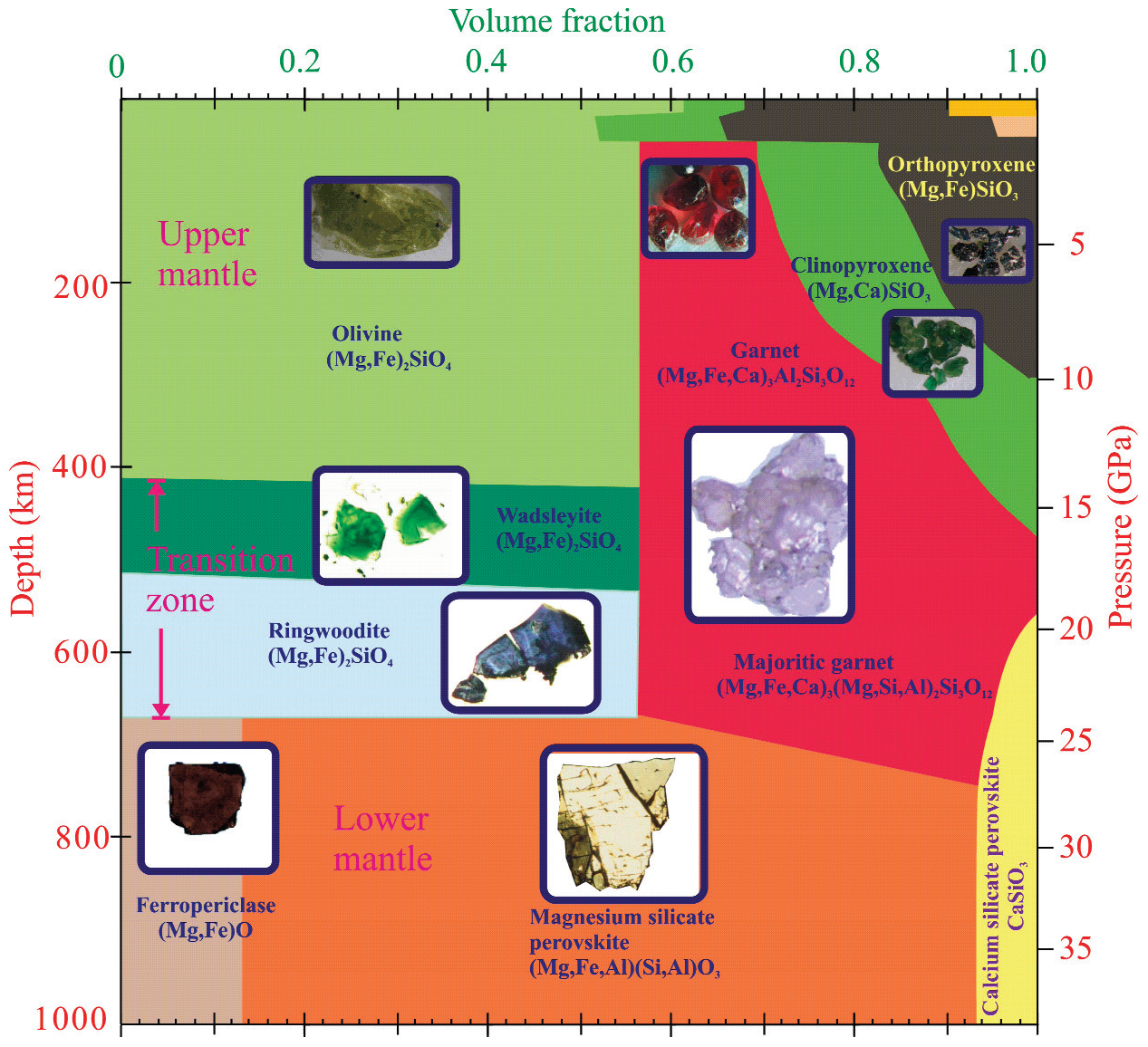
Pyrolitic mantle mineralogy as a function of mineral volume fraction and depth variation.

At the top of the transition zone, olivine undergoes isochemical phase transitions to wadsleyite and ringwoodite. Unlike nominally anhydrous olivine, these high-pressure olivine polymorphs have a large capacity to store water in their crystal structure. This and other evidence has led to the hypothesis that the transition zone may host a large quantity of water. At the base of the transition zone, ringwoodite decomposes into bridgmanite (formerly called magnesium silicate perovskite), and ferropericlase. Garnet also becomes unstable at or slightly below the base of the transition zone.

The lower mantle is composed primarily of bridgmanite and ferropericlase, with minor amounts of calcium perovskite, calcium-ferrite structured oxide, and stishovite. In the lowermost ~200 km (120 mi) of the mantle, bridgmanite isochemically transforms into post-perovskite.

=== Possible remnants of Theia collision ===
Seismic images of Earth's interior have revealed in the lowermost mantle two continent-sized anomalies with low seismic velocities. These zones are denser and likely compositionally different from the surrounding mantle. These anomalies may represent buried relics of Theia mantle material remaining after the Moon-forming event proposed in the Giant-impact hypothesis.

== Composition ==
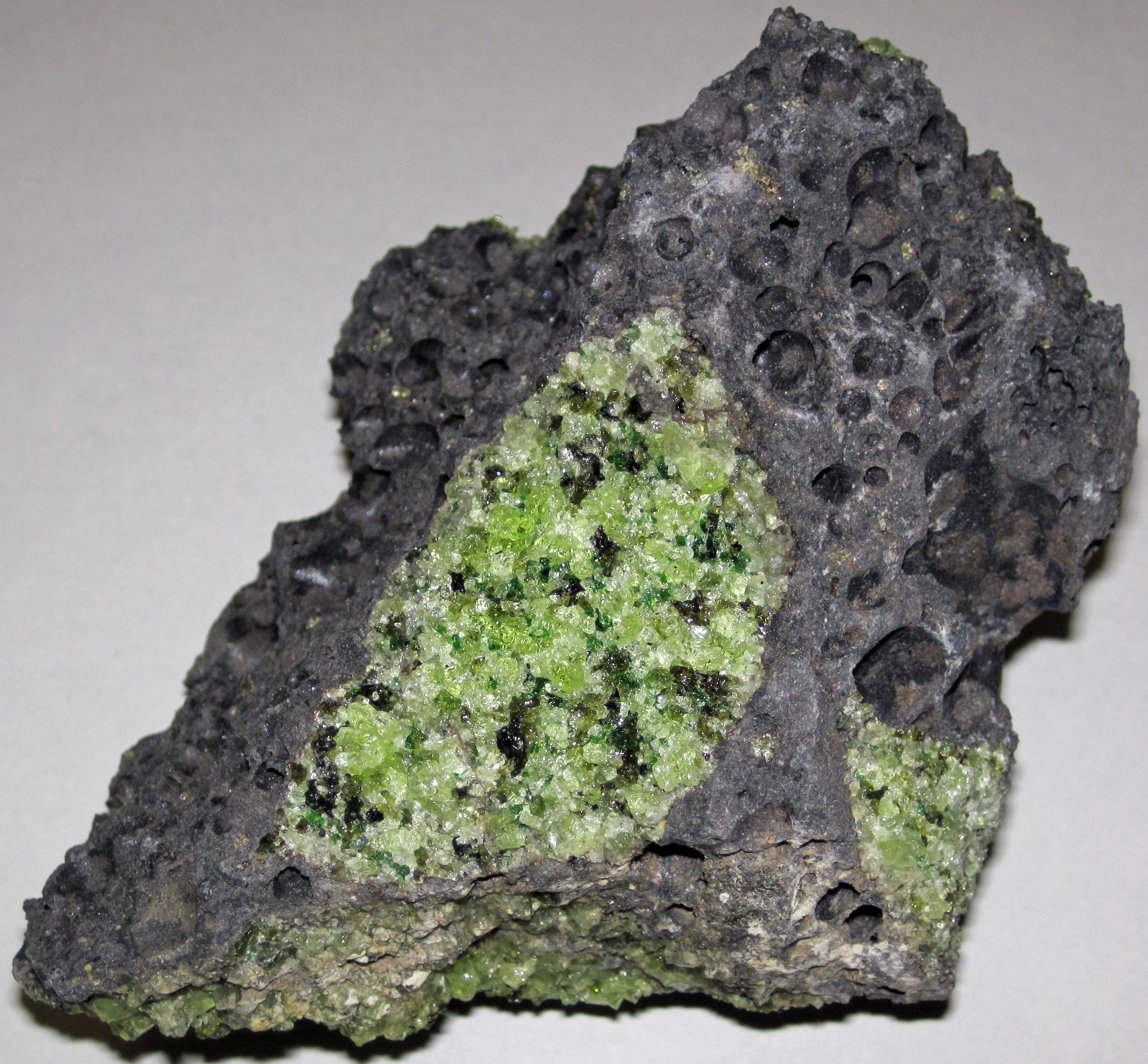
Green xenoliths of peridotite from the mantle are surrounded by black volcanic lava. These peridotite xenoliths were carried upward from the mantle by molten magma during a volcanic eruption in Arizona.

The chemical composition of the mantle is difficult to determine with a high degree of certainty because it is largely inaccessible. Mantle rocks can become accessible in rare circumstances. For example, rare exposures of mantle rocks occur in ophiolites, where sections of oceanic lithosphere have been obducted onto a continent. Another example is when mantle rocks are sampled as xenoliths within basalts or kimberlites, when fragments of mantle rock become embedded in these rocks during their formation.

Composition of the Earth's upper mantle (depleted MORB)
Compound	Mass percent
SiO_{2}	44.71
MgO	38.73
FeO	8.18
Al_{2}O_{3}	3.98
CaO	3.17
Cr_{2}O_{3}	0.57
NiO	0.24
MnO	0.13
Na_{2}O	0.13
TiO_{2}	0.13
P_{2}O_{5}	0.019
K_{2}O	0.006

Most estimates of the mantle composition are based on rocks that sample only the uppermost mantle. There is debate as to whether the rest of the mantle, especially the lower mantle, has the same bulk composition. The mantle's composition has changed through the Earth's history due to the extraction of magma that solidified to form oceanic crust and continental crust.

It has also been proposed in a 2018 study that an exotic form of water known as ice VII can form from supercritical water in the mantle when diamonds containing pressurized water bubbles move upward, cooling the water to the conditions needed for ice VII to form.

== Temperature and pressure ==
In the mantle, temperatures range from approximately 500 kelvins (K) (230 °C; 440 °F) at the upper boundary with the crust to approximately 4,200 K (3,900 °C; 7,100 °F) at the core-mantle boundary. The temperature of the mantle increases rapidly in the thermal boundary layers at the top and bottom of the mantle, and increases gradually through the interior of the mantle. Although the higher temperatures far exceed the melting points of the mantle rocks at the surface (about 1,500 K (1,200 °C; 2,200 °F) for representative peridotite), the mantle is almost exclusively solid. The enormous lithostatic pressure exerted on the mantle prevents melting, because the temperature at which melting begins (the solidus) increases with pressure.

The pressure in the mantle increases from a few hundred megapascals (MPa) at the Moho to 139 GPa (20,200,000 psi; 1,370,000 atm) at the core-mantle boundary.

== Movement ==
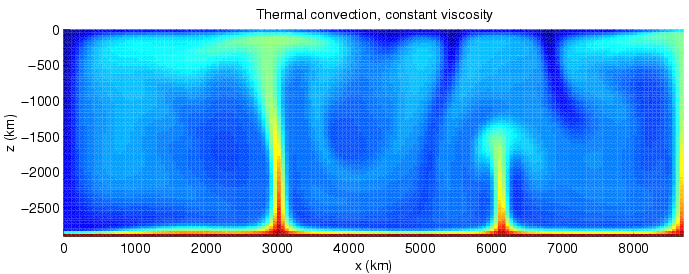
This figure is a snapshot of one time-step in a model of mantle convection. Colors closer to red are hot areas and colors closer to blue are cold areas. In this figure, heat received at the core–mantle boundary results in thermal expansion of the material at the bottom of the model, reducing its density and causing it to send plumes of hot material upwards. Likewise, cooling of material at the surface results in its sinking.

Because of the temperature difference between the Earth's surface and outer core and the ability of the crystalline rocks at high pressure and temperature to undergo slow, creeping, viscous-like deformation over millions of years, there is a convective material circulation in the mantle. Hot material rises (in a mantle plume) while cooler (and heavier) material sinks downward. Downward motion of material occurs at convergent plate boundaries called subduction zones. Locations on the surface that lie over plumes are predicted to have high elevation (because of the buoyancy of the hotter, less-dense plume beneath) and to exhibit hot spot volcanism. The volcanism often attributed to deep mantle plumes is alternatively explained by passive extension of the crust, permitting magma to leak to the surface: the plate hypothesis.

The convection of the Earth's mantle is a chaotic process (in the sense of fluid dynamics), which is thought to be an integral part of the motion of plates. Plate motion should not be confused with continental drift which applies purely to the movement of the crustal components of the continents. The movements of the lithosphere and the underlying mantle are coupled since descending lithosphere is an essential component of convection in the mantle. The observed continental drift is a complicated relationship between the forces causing oceanic lithosphere to sink and the movements within Earth's mantle.

Although there is a tendency to larger viscosity at greater depth, this relation is far from linear and shows layers with dramatically decreased viscosity, in particular in the upper mantle and at the boundary with the core. The mantle within about 200 km (120 mi) above the core–mantle boundary appears to have distinctly different seismic properties than the mantle at slightly shallower depths; this unusual mantle region just above the core is called D″ ("D double-prime"), a nomenclature introduced over 50 years ago by the geophysicist Keith Bullen. D″ may consist of material from subducted slabs that descended and came to rest at the core–mantle boundary or from a new mineral polymorph discovered in perovskite called post-perovskite.

Earthquakes at shallow depths are a result of faulting; however, below about 50 km (30 mi) the hot, high pressure conditions ought to inhibit further seismicity. The mantle is considered to be viscous and incapable of brittle faulting. However, in subduction zones, earthquakes are observed down to 670 km (420 mi). A number of mechanisms have been proposed to explain this phenomenon, including dehydration, thermal runaway, and phase change. The geothermal gradient can be lowered where cool material from the surface sinks downward, increasing the strength of the surrounding mantle, and allowing earthquakes to occur down to a depth of between 400 km (250 mi) and 670 km (420 mi).

The pressure at the bottom of the mantle is ~136 GPa (19,700,000 psi; 1,340,000 atm). Pressure increases as depth increases, since the material beneath has to support the weight of all the material above it. The entire mantle, however, is thought to deform like a fluid on long timescales, with permanent plastic deformation accommodated by the movement of point, line, and/or planar defects through the solid crystals composing the mantle. Estimates for the viscosity of the upper mantle range between 10^{19} and 10^{24} pascal seconds (Pa·s) depending on depth, temperature, composition, state of stress, and numerous other factors. Thus, the upper mantle can only flow very slowly. However, when large forces are applied to the uppermost mantle it can become weaker, and this effect is thought to be important in allowing the formation of tectonic plate boundaries.

== Exploration ==
Exploration of the mantle is generally conducted at the seabed rather than on land because of the relative thinness of the oceanic crust as compared to the significantly thicker continental crust.

The first attempt at mantle exploration, known as Project Mohole, was abandoned in 1966 after repeated failures and cost over-runs. The deepest penetration was approximately 180 m (590 ft). In 2005 an oceanic borehole reached 1,416 metres (4,646 ft) below the sea floor from the ocean drilling vessel JOIDES Resolution.

More successful was the Deep Sea Drilling Project (DSDP) that operated from 1968 to 1983. Coordinated by Scripps Institution of Oceanography at the University of California, San Diego, DSDP provided crucial data to support the seafloor spreading hypothesis and helped to prove the theory of plate tectonics. Glomar Challenger conducted the drilling operations. DSDP was the first of three international scientific ocean drilling programs that have operated over more than 40 years. Scientific planning was conducted under the auspices of the Joint Oceanographic Institutions for Deep Earth Sampling (JOIDES), whose advisory group consisted of 250 distinguished scientists from academic institutions, government agencies, and private industry from all over the world. The Ocean Drilling Program (ODP) continued exploration from 1985 to 2003 when it was replaced by the Integrated Ocean Drilling Program (IODP).

On 5 March 2007, a team of scientists on board the RRS James Cook embarked on a voyage to an area of the Mid-Atlantic Ridge containing exposed mantle rock, midway between the Cape Verde Islands and the Caribbean Sea. The site lies approximately three kilometres beneath the ocean surface and covers thousands of square kilometres. Also in 2007, the Japanese vessel Chikyū attempted to drill up to 7,000 m (23,000 ft) below the seabed, nearly three times as deep as preceding oceanic drillings.

A novel method of exploring the uppermost few hundred kilometres of the Earth was proposed in 2005, consisting of a small, dense, heat-generating probe which melts its way down through the crust and mantle while its position and progress are tracked by acoustic signals generated in the rocks. The probe consists of an outer sphere of tungsten about one metre in diameter with a cobalt-60 interior acting as a radioactive heat source. It was calculated that such a probe will reach the oceanic Moho in less than 6 months and attain minimum depths of well over 100 km (62 mi) in a few decades beneath both oceanic and continental lithosphere.

Exploration can also be aided through computer simulations of the evolution of the mantle. In 2009, a supercomputer application provided new insight into the distribution of mineral deposits, especially isotopes of iron, from when the mantle developed 4.5 billion years ago.

In 2023, JOIDES Resolution recovered cores of what appeared to be rock from the upper mantle after drilling only a few hundred meters into the Atlantis Massif. The borehole reached a maximum depth of 1,268 meters and recovered 886 meters of rock samples consisting of primarily peridotite. There is debate over the extent to which the samples represent the upper mantle with some arguing the effects of seawater on the samples situates them as examples of deep lower crust. However, the samples offer a much closer analogue to mantle rock than magmatic xenoliths as the sampled rock never melted into magma or recrystallized.

== See also ==
- Internal structure of Earth
- Large low-shear-velocity provinces
- Mantle (geology) – a wider description of the mantle of Earth and other astronomical bodies
- Seismic tomography – technique for imaging the subsurface of Earth using seismic waves
