= Earth's crustal evolution =

Consolidation of the Earth's crust

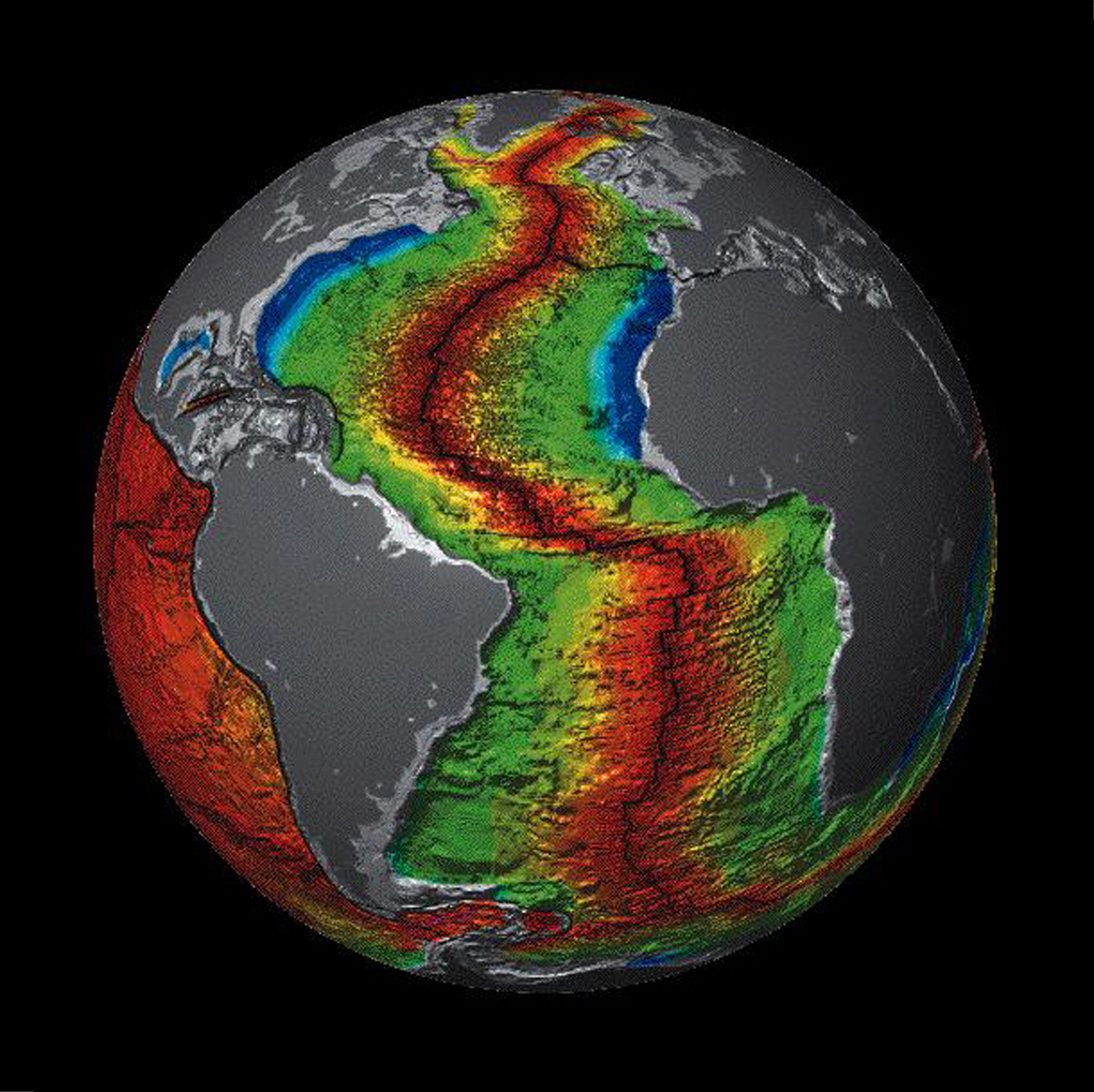
Surface map of oceanic crust showing the generation of younger (red) crust and eventual destruction of older (blue) crust. This demonstrates the crustal spatial evolution at the Earth's surface dictated by plate tectonics.

Earth's crustal evolution involves the formation, destruction and renewal of the rocky outer shell at that planet's surface.

The variation in composition within the Earth's crust is much greater than that of other terrestrial planets. Mars, Venus, Mercury and other planetary bodies have relatively quasi-uniform crusts unlike that of Earth which contains both oceanic and continental plates. This unique property reflects the complex series of crustal processes that have taken place throughout the planet's history, including the ongoing process of plate tectonics.

The proposed mechanisms regarding Earth's crustal evolution take a theory-orientated approach. Fragmentary geologic evidence and observations provide the basis for hypothetical solutions to problems relating to the early Earth system. Therefore, a combination of these theories creates both a framework of current understanding and also a platform for future study.

== Early crust ==
=== Mechanisms of early crust formation ===
The early Earth was entirely molten. This was due to high temperatures created and maintained by the following processes:

- Compression of the early atmosphere
- Rapid axial rotation
- Regular impacts with neighbouring planetesimals.

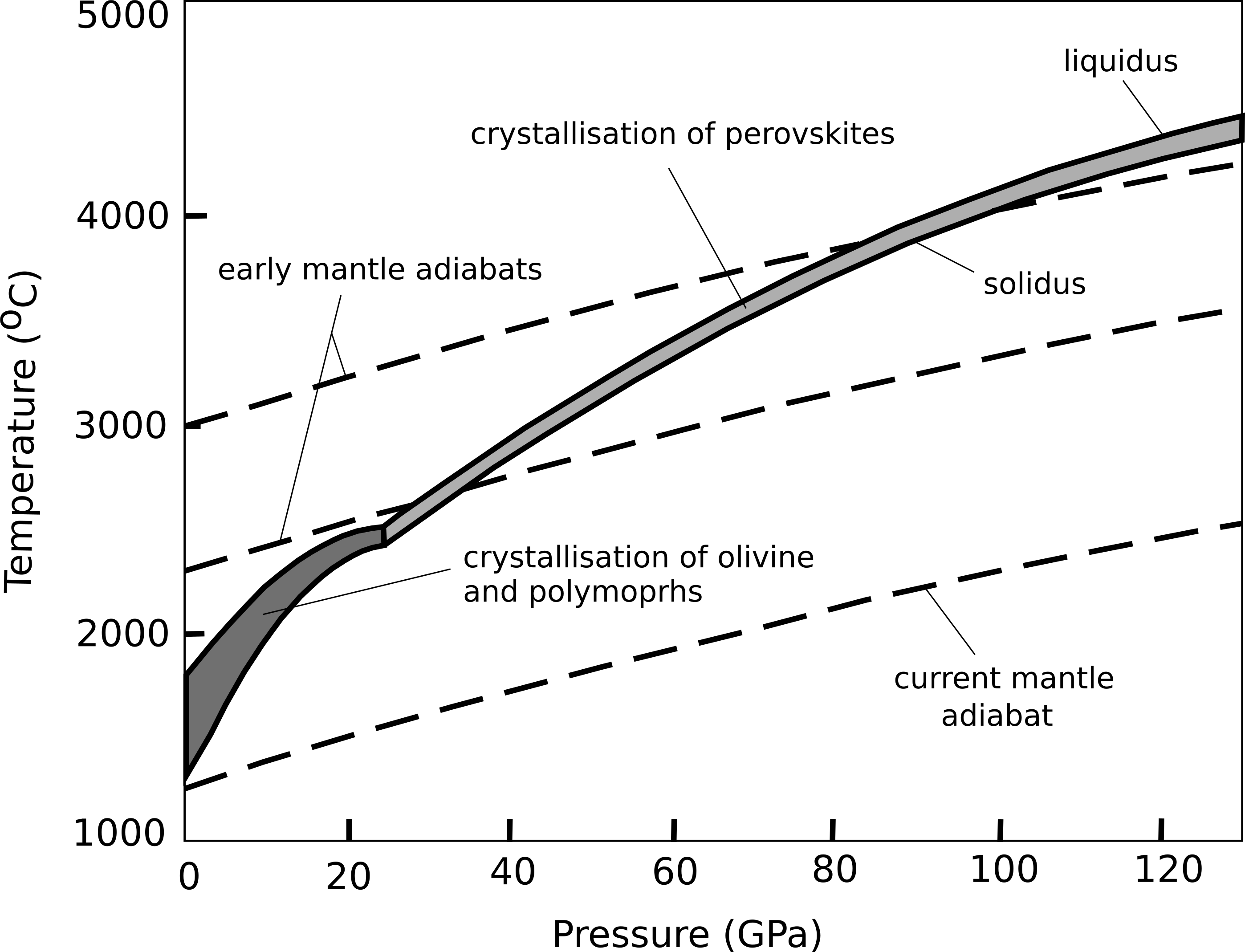
A phase diagram showing sequential crystallisation within the early mantle, forming the early crust. An adiabat represents a change of temperature with pressure if no heat were lost through convection. Early mantle adiabats show crystallisation took place from the base; above approximately 25 GPa (deep mantle) perovskites would begin to crystallise, below 25 GPa (upper mantle) olivine would crystallise.

The mantle remained hotter than modern day temperatures throughout the Archean. Over time the Earth began to cool as planetary accretion slowed and heat stored within the magma ocean was lost to space through radiation.

A theory for the initiation of magma solidification states that once cool enough, the cooler base of the magma ocean would begin to crystallise first. This is because pressure below 25 GPa near the surface cause the solidus to lower. The formation of a thin 'chill-crust' at the extreme surface would provide thermal insulation to the shallow sub surface, keeping it warm enough to maintain the mechanism of crystallisation from the deep magma ocean.

The composition of the crystals produced during the crystallisation of the magma ocean varied with depth. Experiments involving the melting of peridotite magma show that deep in the mantle (>≈700 km), the main mineral present would be Mg-perovskite, whereas olivine would dominate in the shallower areas along with its high pressure polymorphs e.g. garnet and majorite.

A contributing theory to the formation of the first continental crust is through intrusive plutonic magmatism. The product of these eruptions formed a hot, thick lithosphere which underwent regular cycling with the mantle. The heat released by this form of volcanism, as well as assisting mantle convection, increased the geothermal gradient of the early crust.

== Crustal dichotomy ==
The crustal dichotomy is the distinct contrast in composition and nature of the oceanic and continental plates, which together form the overall crust. The difference between continental and oceanic crust.

=== Timing ===
Oceanic and continental crusts are, at the present day, produced and maintained through plate tectonic processes. However, the same mechanisms are unlikely to have produced the crustal dichotomy of the early lithosphere. This is thought to be true on the basis that sections of the thin, low density continental lithosphere thought to have originally covered the planet could not have been subducted under each other.

Consequently, a proposed relative timing for crustal dichotomy has been put forward stating that the dichotomy began before the commencement of global plate tectonics. This is so a difference in crustal density could be established to facilitate plate subduction.

=== Formation ===
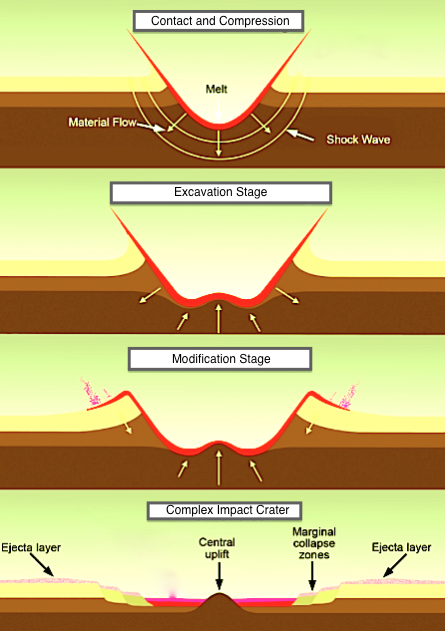
Development of the base of an impact crater on the Earth's surface showing infill of basaltic partial melts from mantle. This solidified to form the early differentiated oceanic crust.

==== Impact cratering ====
Large and numerous impact craters can be recognised on planetary bodies across the Solar System. These craters are thought to date back to a period where there was an increased frequency and intensity of asteroid impacts with terrestrial planets, known as the Late Heavy Bombardment, which terminated approximately 4 billion years ago. This proposal goes on to claim the Earth would have also sustained the same relative intensity of cratering as other planetesimals in the Solar System. It is therefore only due to Earth's high erosional rates and constant plate tectonics that the craters are not visible today. By scaling up the number and size of impact craters seen on the Moon to fit the size of Earth, it is predicted that at least 50% of the Earth's initial crust was covered in impact basins. This estimate provides a lower limit of the effect impact cratering had on the Earth's surface.

===== Effects =====
The main effects of impact cratering on the early lithosphere were:

- Formation of large craters. Isostatic rebound would adjust the depth of the craters making them relatively shallow in comparison to their diameter; some reaching 4 km deep and 1000 km in diameter.
- Topographic division between the low-lying impact basins and the now elevated surface.
- Release in pressure at the surface from the removal of overburden. This produced a greater increase in temperature with depth below the surface. Increased surface temperatures caused the partial melting of mantle which erupted and deposited within the surface basins. The pyrolite mantle would have produced basaltic partial melts, compositionally contrasting to the existing sialic crust.

The magnitude of these impacts is interpreted, with a high level of uncertainty, to have converted roughly half of the 'continental' crust into terrestrial maria, thereby providing a method for the formation of crustal dichotomy, as seen today.

== Types of crust ==
=== Primordial crust ===
The initial crystallisation of minerals from the magma ocean formed the primordial crust.

A potential explanation of this process states the resultant solidification of the mantle edge took place approximately 4.43 Ga. This would subsequently produce continents composed of komatiite, an ultramafic rock rich in magnesium with a high melting point and low dynamic viscosity. Another line of research follows up on this, proposing that differences in the densities of newly formed crystals caused separation of crustal rocks; upper crust largely composed of fractionated gabbros and lower crust composed of anorthosites. The overall result of initial crystallisation formed a primordial crust roughly 60 km in depth.

The lack of certainty regarding the formation of primordial crust is due to there being no remaining present day examples. This is due to Earth's high erosional rates and the subduction and subsequent destruction of tectonic plates throughout its 4.5 Ga history. Furthermore, during its existence the primordial crust is thought to have been regularly broken and re-formed by impacts involving other planetesimals. This continued for several hundred million years after accretion, which concluded approximately 4.4 Ga. The outcome of this would be the constant alteration in the composition of the primordial crust, increasing the difficulty in determining its nature.

=== Secondary crust ===
Recycling of existing primordial crust contributes to the production of secondary crust. Partial melting of the existing crust increases the mafic content of the melt producing basaltic secondary crust. A further method of formation due to the decay of radioactive elements within the Earth releasing heat energy and eventually causing the partial melting of upper mantle, also producing basaltic lavas. As a result, most secondary crust on Earth is formed at mid ocean ridges forming the oceanic crust.

=== Tertiary crust ===
The present day continental crust is an example of a tertiary crust. Tertiary crust is the most differentiated type of crust and so has a composition vastly different to that of the bulk Earth. The tertiary crust contains over 20% of the abundance of incompatible elements, which are elements with a size or charge that prevent them from being included in mineral structure. This a result of its generation from the subduction and partial melting of secondary crust where it undergoes further fractional crystallisation. Two stages of evolution produce an increased proportion of incompatible elements.

== Initiation of plate tectonics ==
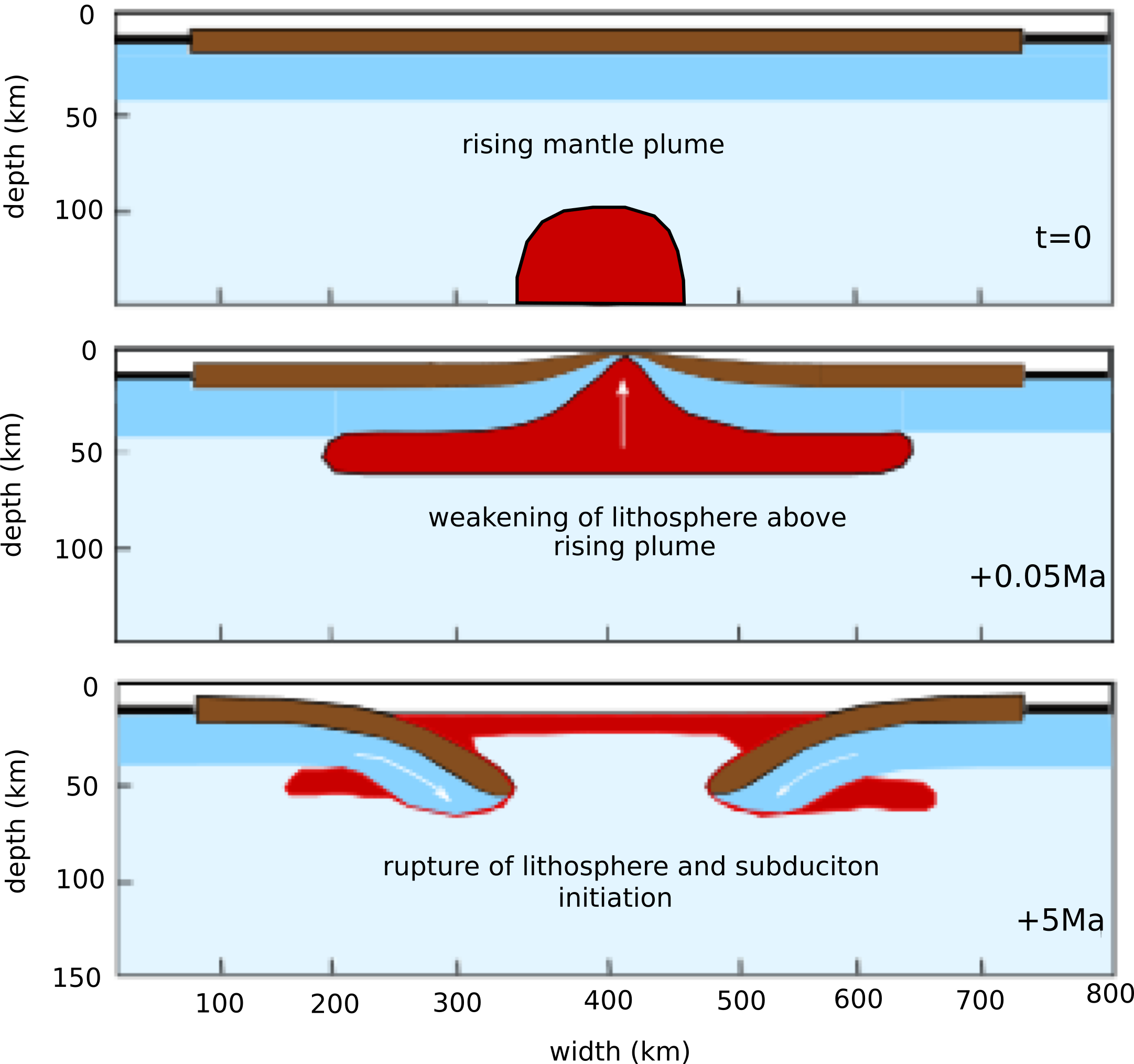
A schematic evolutionary diagram showing the impact of a mantle plume on the early lithosphere (dark blue) and surface proto-crust (brown). This initiated subduction and subsequent global plate tectonics within a previously unseparated lithosphere that had no lateral surface movement.Modified from

=== Plume induced subduction ===
The formation and development of plumes in the early mantle contributed to triggering the lateral movement of crust across the Earth's surface. The effect of upwelling mantle plumes on the lithosphere can be seen today through local depressions around hotspots such as Hawaii. The scale of this impact is much less than that exhibited in the Archean eon where mantle temperatures were much greater. Localised areas of hot mantle rose to the surface through a central plume wedge, weakening the damaged and already thin lithosphere. Once the plume head breaks the surface, crust either side of the head is forced downwards through the conservation of mass, initiating subduction. Numerical modelling shows only strongly energetic plumes are capable of weakening the lithosphere enough to rupture it, such plumes would have been present in the hot Archean mantle.

Pre-tectonic subduction can also be inferred from the internal volcanism on Venus. Artemis Corona is a large plume formed by the upwelling of mantle derived magma and is on a scale potentially comparable to that in the Archean mantle. Models using its known characteristics showed that continued magmatism from conductive heat through the plume caused gravitational collapse. The weight of collapse caused the spreading of the surrounding crust outwards and subsequent subduction around the margins. The anhydrous nature of the crust on Venus prevents it from sliding past each other, whereas through the study of oxygen isotopes, the presence of water on Earth can be confirmed from 4.3 Ga. Thus, this model helps provide a mechanism for how plate tectonics could have been triggered on Earth, although it does not demonstrate that subduction was initiated at the earliest confirmed presence of water on Earth. Based on these models, the onset of subduction and plate tectonics is dated at 3.6 Ga.

=== Late Heavy Bombardment ===
Impact cratering also had consequences for both the development of plume-induced subduction and the establishment of global plate tectonics. The steepening of geothermal gradients could have directly enhanced convective mantle transport which now beneath an increasingly fractured lithosphere could have created stresses great enough to cause rifting and the separation of crust into plates.

== Crustal growth rates ==
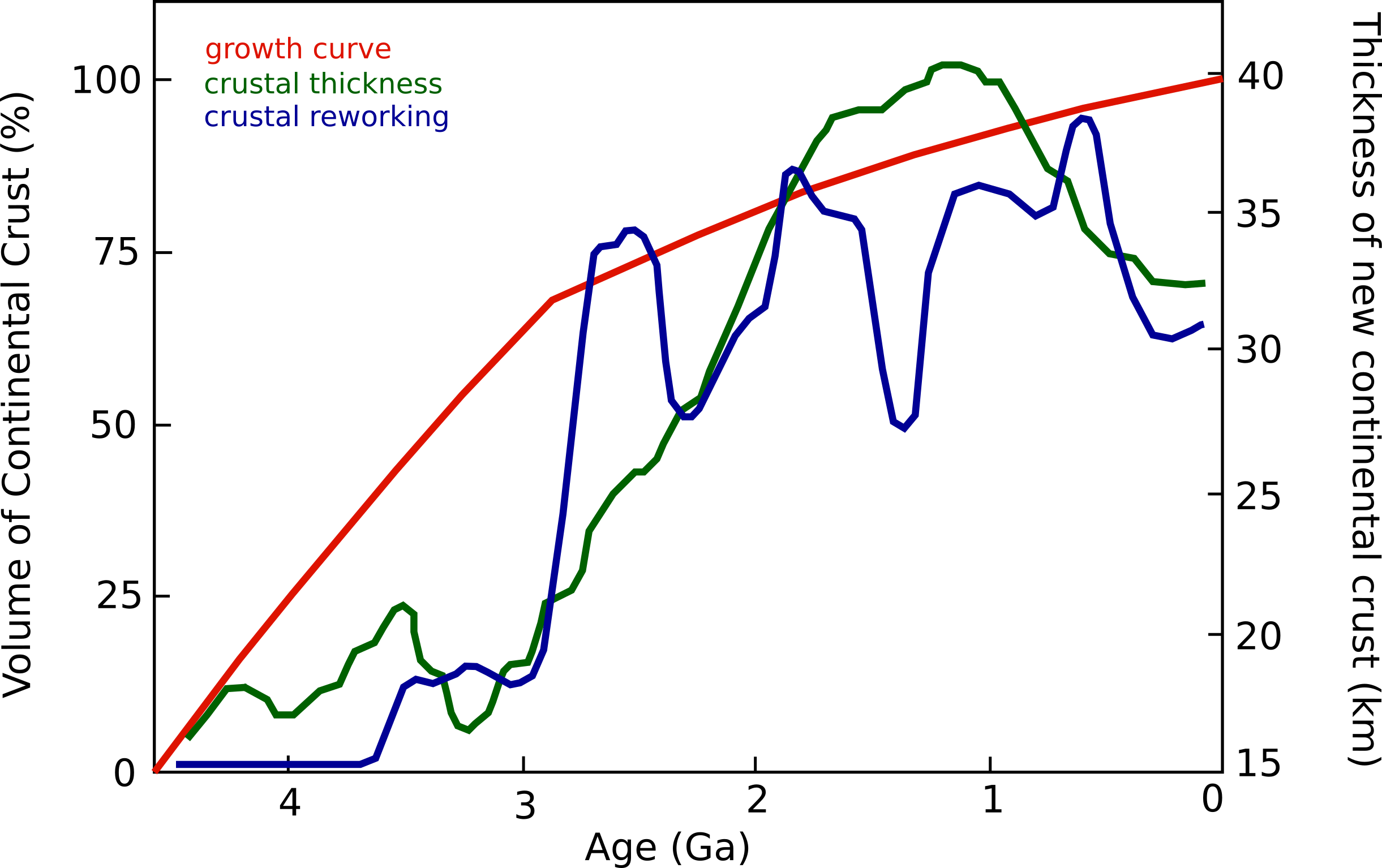
Plots showing the rate of continental crustal growth over time as a percentage of the total mass, along with associated thickness of the newly generated crust. The plot of crustal reworking represents the amount of post formational alteration undergone by the crust. The dramatic increase in crustal reworking and reduction in the rate of crustal growth at approximately 3.6Ga represents the onset of subduction and plate tectonics. Modified from

=== Lithological dating ===
Crustal growth rates can be used to calculate estimates for the age of the continental crust. This can be done through analysis of igneous rocks with the same isotopic composition as initial mantle rock. These igneous rocks are dated and assumed to be direct evidence of new continental crust formation. The resulting ages of isotopically juvenile igneous rocks give distinct peaks, representing an increased proportion of igneous rock and therefore increased crust growth, at 2.7, 1.9 and 1.2 Ga. The validity of these results is questioned as the peaks could represent periods of preservation rather than increased continental crust generation. This is reinforced by the fact that such peaks are not observed in recent geologic time where it is given that magmatism resulting from the plate subduction has strongly contributed to producing new crust.

Crustal growth rates from igneous rocks can be compared to the rates generated from radiogenic isotope ratios in sedimentary rocks. Projections of growth rates using these techniques does not produce staggered peaks, instead smooth shallow curves presenting a more constant rate of crustal growth. Although representative of large periods of time, limitations are found where samples do not solely represent magmatic production events. Instead samples include the mixing of sediments which produces a mix of original and altered isotope ratios.

=== Zircon dating ===
Zircon minerals can be both detrital grains from sedimentary rocks and crystals in igneous rocks. Therefore, a combination of zircon forms can provide a more accurate estimate of crustal growth rates. Further to this, zircon minerals can be subject to Hf and O isotope ratio analysis. This is important as Hf isotopes indicate whether a rock originates from the mantle or an existing rock. High δ^{18}O values of zircons represent rock recycled at the Earth's surface and thus potentially producing mixed samples. The outcome of this combined analysis is valid zircons showing periods of increased crustal generation at 1.9 and 3.3 Ga, the latter of which representing the time period following the commencement of global plate tectonics.

== Modern analog of early crust ==
=== Iceland ===
Geochemical features of early Archean rocks from the Acasta Gneiss complex have been compared to some modern intermediate-silicic rocks from Iceland and have been found to be very similar. Both have high total FeO, minor or absent Eu anomalies, high Na, and Sr/Y depletions. In addition, whole-rock trace-element data shows that shallow- rather than deep-level processes controlled the magmatic evolution of both the Acasta Gneiss complex, and silicic rocks on Iceland.
