= Diamond inclusions =

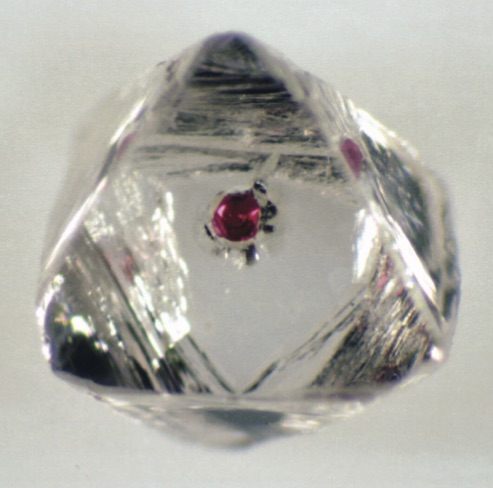
Garnet inclusion in the host diamond.

Diamond inclusions are the non-diamond materials that get encapsulated inside diamond during its formation process in the mantle. The trapped materials can be other minerals or fluids like water. Since diamonds have high strength and low reactivity with either the inclusion or the volcanic host rocks which carry the diamond to the Earth's surface, the diamond serves as a container that preserves the included material intact under the changing conditions from the mantle to the surface. Although diamonds can only place a lower bound on the pressure of their formation, many inclusions provide additional constraints on the pressure, temperature and even age of formation.

== Inclusion types ==
Types and materials of diamond inclusions (Summary)
Types	Main materials
Mineral (solid)	Silicates (e.g. garnet, silicate perovskites), oxides, sulfides
Fluid	Fluids (containing carbonates, silicates, sulfides, halides, hydroxyl groups, etc.), water, brines
Multiphase	Fluid inclusions coexisting with mineral inclusions in the same diamond

=== Mineral inclusions ===
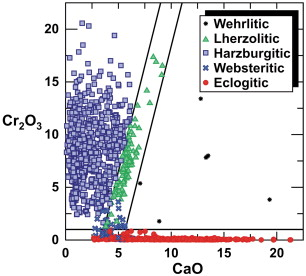
Chromium vs. Calcium content of various inclusions. Eclogite (i.e. garnet-bearing) inclusions in diamond contain less Cr_{2}O_{3} whereas peridotite (lherzolite and harzburgite) garnet inclusions have less CaO. Eclogite and peridotite are the two main parental mantle rocks and wehrlite and websterite are minor types.

Mineral inclusions, especially the silicate inclusions in lithospheric diamonds, can be classified into two dominant types depending on the mantle parental rocks of the host diamond: eclogite (E-type) and peridotite (P-type). These are the two main parental rocks for the diamond formation which mostly lead to silicate inclusions. P-type and E-type inclusions can be distinguished based on the content of specific materials in the trapped mineral. For instance, in garnet inclusions, the content ratio of chromium(III) oxide (Cr_{2}O_{3}) and calcium oxide (CaO) can be the basis for the classification. E-type garnet inclusion contains less Cr_{2}O_{3} while P-type contains less CaO. Trace elements such as rare earth elements (REE) can also characterize P-type and E-type garnet inclusions. Similarly, nitrogen inclusions can be classified into P-type and E-type inclusions by analyzing their stable isotopes. For sulfide inclusions, osmium contents from rhenium-osmium dating can differentiate P-type and E-type inclusions.

In the cratonic crust of the Kaapvaal-Zimbabwe craton, Southern Africa, seismic velocity at 150-km depth correlates with the nature of diamond inclusions, whether peridotitic or eclogitic. This suggests that lithospheric P-wave speeds can be used, perhaps elsewhere as well as in Southern Africa, to map the distribution of different diamond source regions.

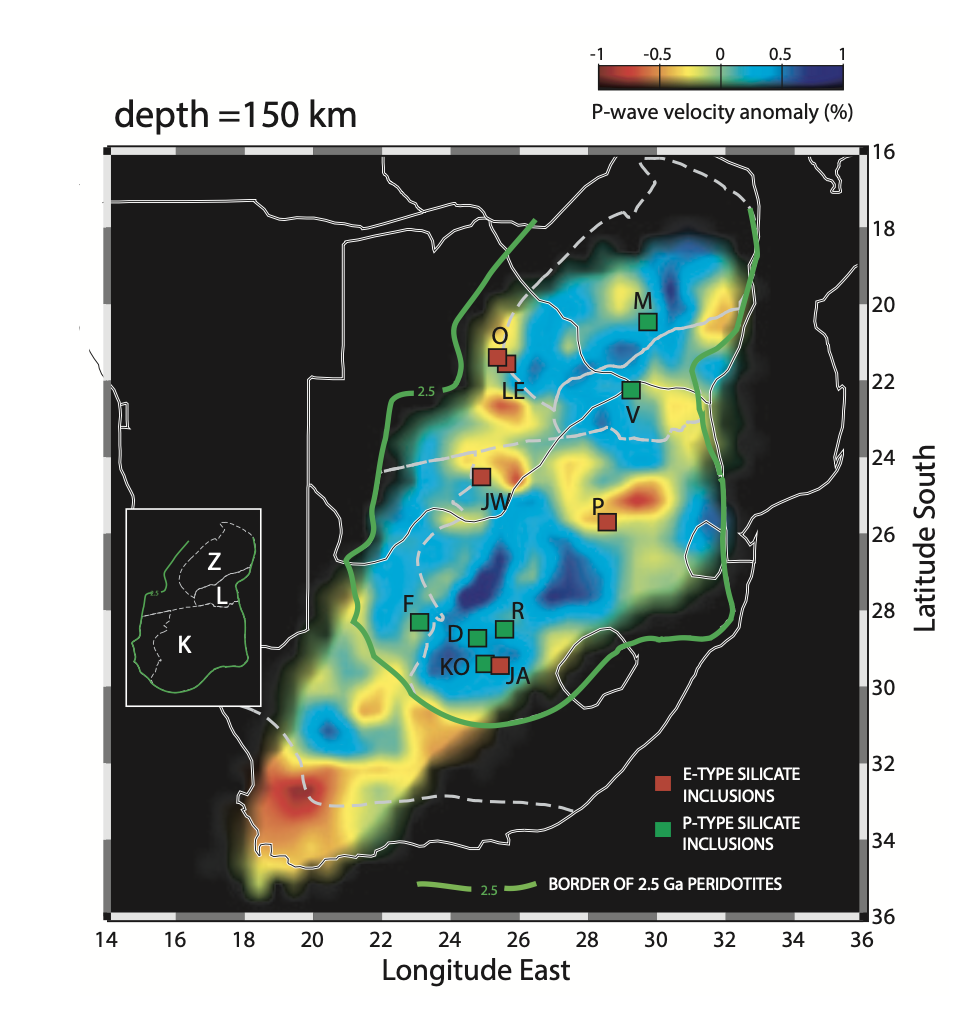
Tomographic image of the lithospheric mantle obtained from the P-wave data. Red squares represent eclogitic and green squares represent peridotitic inclusions.

Sub-lithospheric mineral inclusions such as majorite and silicate perovskites (e.g. bridgmanite, davemaoite) can be also classified into ultramafic type (peridotitic) and basaltic type (eclogitic) inclusions. However, these additional classifications are harder than the lithospheric inclusions due to the rarity of samples, small grain size, and difficulties in recognizing the original mineral assemblages under deep-mantle conditions.

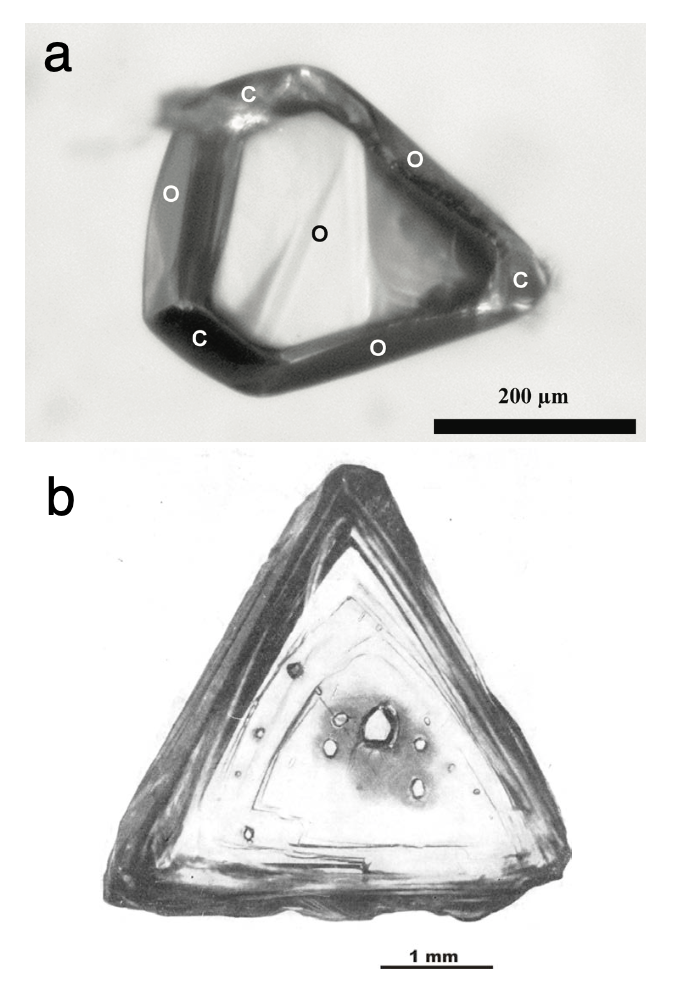
Examples showing the imposition of the host diamond's morphology on the included mineral in syngenetic inclusions. (a) Inclusion of olivine in diamond with their faces imposed by octahedral (o) and cubic (c) shapes common in diamond. (b) Diamond with several olivine inclusions with faces parallel to the octahedral diamond face.

The timing of mineral crystallization can be used to categorize diamond inclusions into three types: protogenetic, syngenetic, and epigenetic inclusions. Minerals in the protogenetic inclusions were crystallized earlier than the diamond formation. The host diamond encapsulated pre-existing minerals during its crystallization. Therefore, protogenetic inclusions provide information on the conditions that existed before diamond formation. This can explain isotopically different mineral inclusions found from the same generation of diamonds. For syngenetic mineral inclusions, the crystallization of the trapped mineral and the diamond occur simultaneously. In this case, the environmental records from included minerals match that of the host diamond. Syngenetic inclusions can be evidenced by the imposition of host diamond morphology on the trapped mineral. Epigenetic inclusions are formed from minerals that crystallized after the diamond formation. The after-formed minerals can crystallize along diamond fractures or the pre-existing protogenetic/syngenetic inclusions may have been altered into new material.

Mineral inclusions can preserve materials formed under the extreme environments in Earth's mantle back to surface conditions. This enables the discovery of the natural form of minerals which have previously been only synthesized in the laboratory. For instance, the natural calcium silicate perovskite (CaSiO_{3}), was recently given the mineral name davemaoite, when it was discovered as a mineral inclusion in a diamond in 2021. The discovery was surprising due to the extreme conditions necessary to synthesize davemaoite which made it seem unlikely that it could be preserved at the Earth's surface.

Classification of mineral inclusions (Summary)
Classification	Types	Etc.
Location of the inclusion	Lithospheric; Sub-lithospheric	
Parental rocks of the host diamond	P-type (peridotitic); E-type (eclogitic)	Common bases that determine P/E-types; Cr_{2}O_{3}/CaO content (garnet inclusion) Osmium content (sulfide inclusion) Stable isotope (nitrogen inclusion) Rare-earth element content Seismic velocity differences in P-wave
Timing of crystallization of the included mineral	Protogenetic; Syngenetic; Epigenetic	

=== Fluid inclusions ===
Fluid inclusions trap fluids containing materials like silicates, carbonates and hydroxyl groups, water and brine. Such fluid inclusions can be found in coated diamonds (monocrystalline diamonds coated by polycrystalline diamonds with fluid inclusions) and fibrous diamonds (diamonds coated by rods or blades of diamonds with fibrous structures). Fluid microinclusions mostly contain carbonates with the silicate or halides forming the silicate-carbonate or halide-carbonate assemblages. Similarly, subduction-derived saline fluids with a high concentration of K and Cl can be found from microinclusions in the cloudy diamonds (fluid-rich central fibrous diamonds transforming into fluid-poor outward diamonds). Saline and silicic fluid inclusions do not co-exist, implying the immiscibility of the two fluids during the diamond formation. The presence of volatile materials originating from subduction zones such as sulfide inclusions can suggest the viability of subduction-related crustal recycling during the diamond formation in specific continents where the diamond was created.

In 2018, the high-pressure form of water known as ice-VII was found in the diamond inclusion. This discovery suggests the presence of water-rich fluids in the transition zone.

=== Multiphase inclusions ===
In the diamond-forming conditions of high pressures and temperatures, hydrous silicate melt and the aqueous fluid make a single-phase supercritical mixture. This mixture forms fibrous, cloudy, or polycrystalline diamonds with multiphase inclusions. Multiphase inclusions host fluids (mainly containing carbonates and silicates, high density aqueous fluids, and brines) and the mineral inclusions in the same diamond.

== Research techniques ==
High-resolution techniques like Fourier Transform Infrared (FTIR) spectroscopy, Transmission Electron Microscopy (TEM), Scanning Electron Microscopy (SEM) imaging, and Electron Microprobe (EPMA) are commonly used to analyze the composition and phase of the trapped material in the diamond. Non-destructive elastic methods such as micro-Raman spectroscopy, strain birefringence analysis, and single-crystal X-ray diffraction are used to estimate the pressure-temperature conditions of the material inside the diamond while minimizing the sample damage.
