= Pyrolite =

Model composition of the Earth's mantle

Pyrolite is a term used to characterize a model composition of the Earth's mantle. This model is based on that a pyrolite source can produce mid-ocean ridge basalts (MORB) by partial melting. It was first proposed by Ted Ringwood (1962) as being 1 part basalt and 4 parts harzburgite, but later was revised to being 1 part tholeiitic basalt and 3 parts dunite. The term is derived from the mineral names pyroxene and olivine. However, whether pyrolite is entirely representative of the Earth's mantle remains debated.

== Chemical composition and phase transition ==
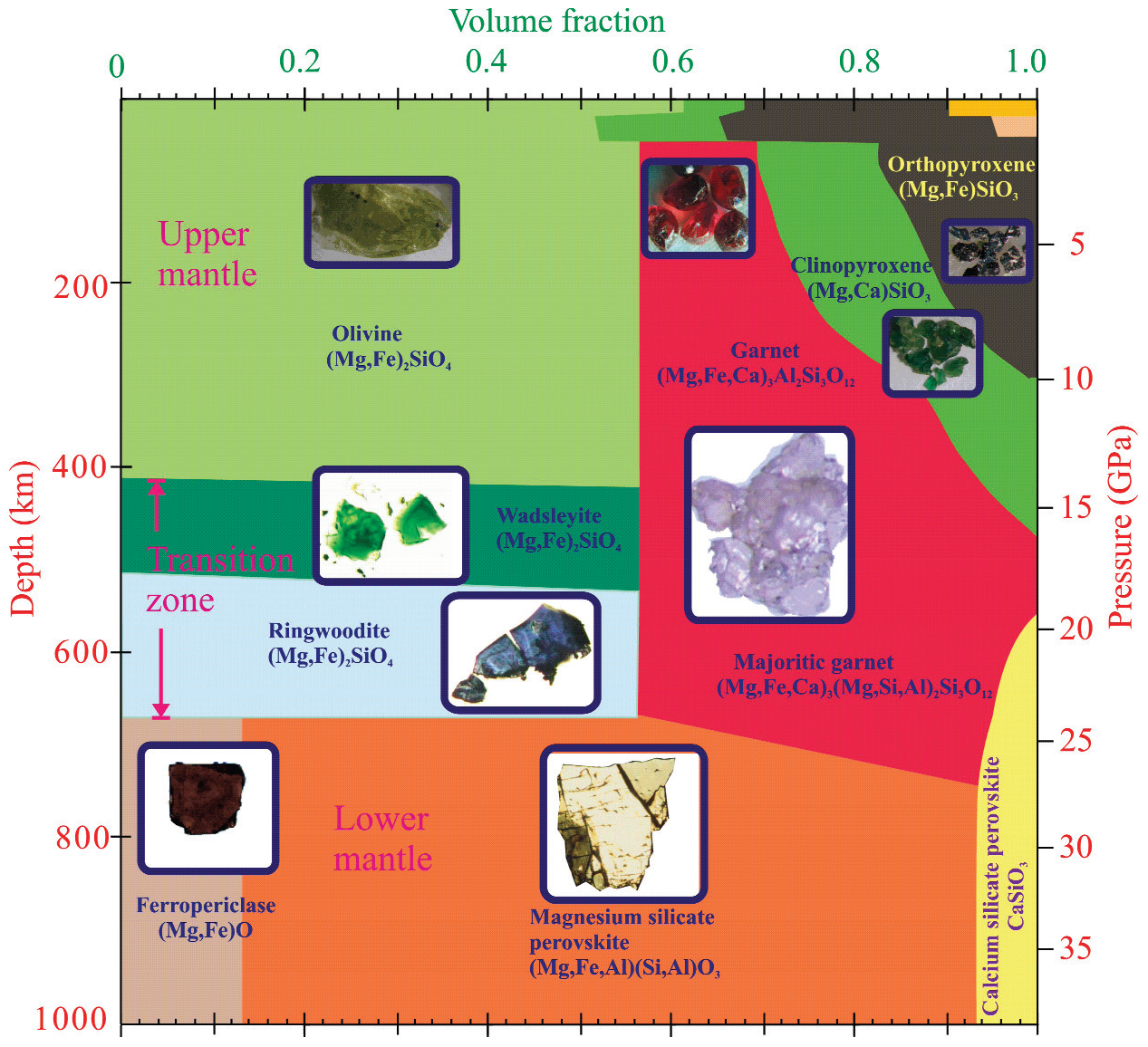
Pyrolitic mantle mineralogy as a function of mineral volume fraction and depth variation.

The major elements composition of pyrolite is about 44.9 wt% SiO_{2}, 4.44 wt% Al_{2}O_{3}, 8.03 wt% FeO, 3.54 wt% CaO, 37.71 wt% MgO, 0.36 wt% Na_{2}O.

1) A pyrolitic upper mantle is mainly composed of olivine (~60 volume percent (vol%)), clinopyroxene, orthopyroxene, and garnet. Pyroxene would gradually dissolved into garnet and form majoritic garnet.

2) A pyrolitic mantle transition zone is mainly composed of 60 vol% olivine-polymorphs (wadsleyite, ringwoodite) and ~40 vol% majoritic garnet. The top and bottom boundary of the mantle transition zone are mainly marked by olivine-wadsleyite transition and ringwoodite-perovskite transition, respectively.

3) A pyrolitic lower mantle is mainly composed of magnesium perovskite (~80 vol%), ferroperclase (~13 vol%), and calcium perovskite (~7%). In addition, post-perovskite may present at the bottom of the lower mantle.

== Seismic velocity and density properties ==
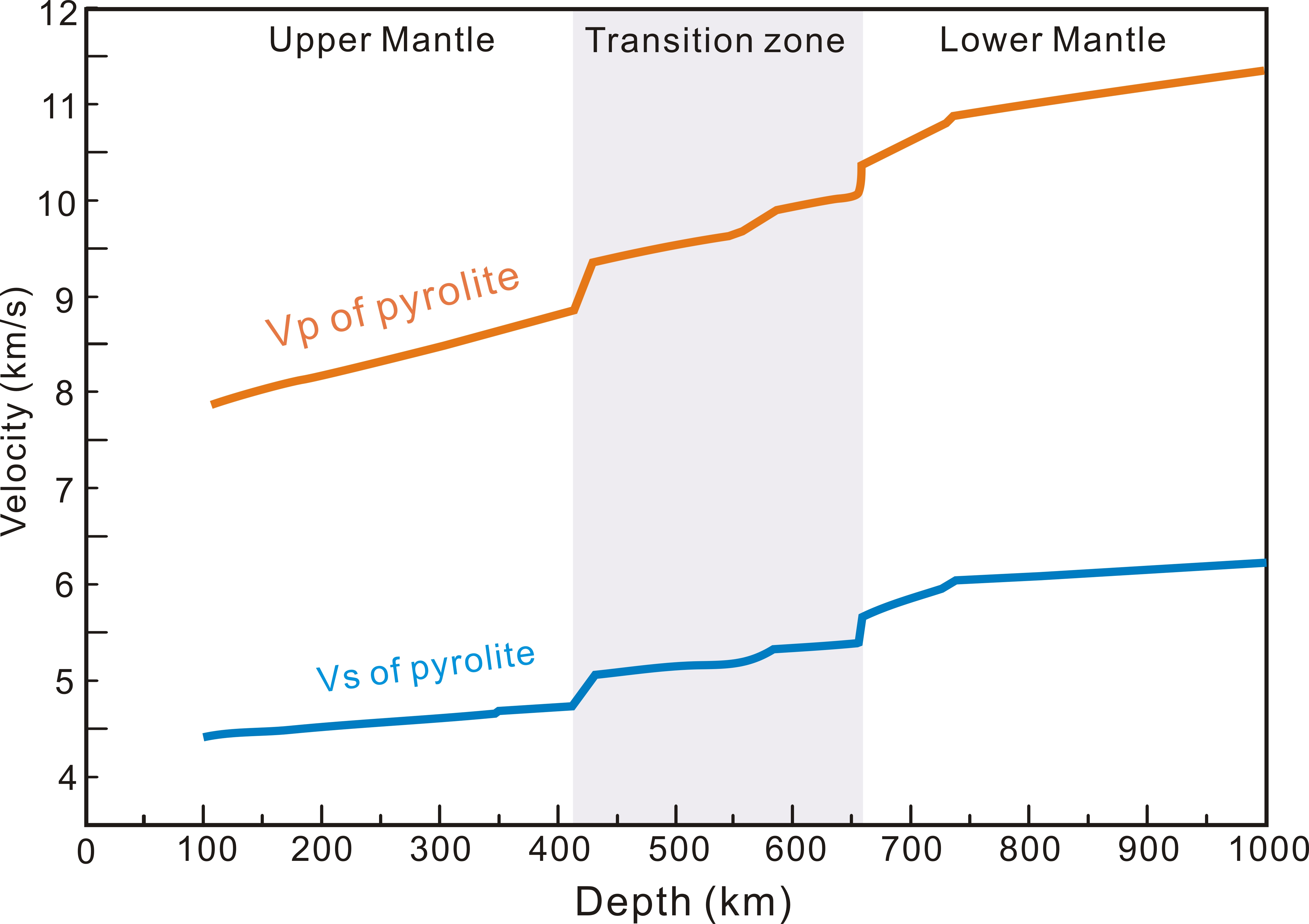
Fig. 2 Vp and Vs profiles of pyrolite along the 1600 K adiabatic geotherm

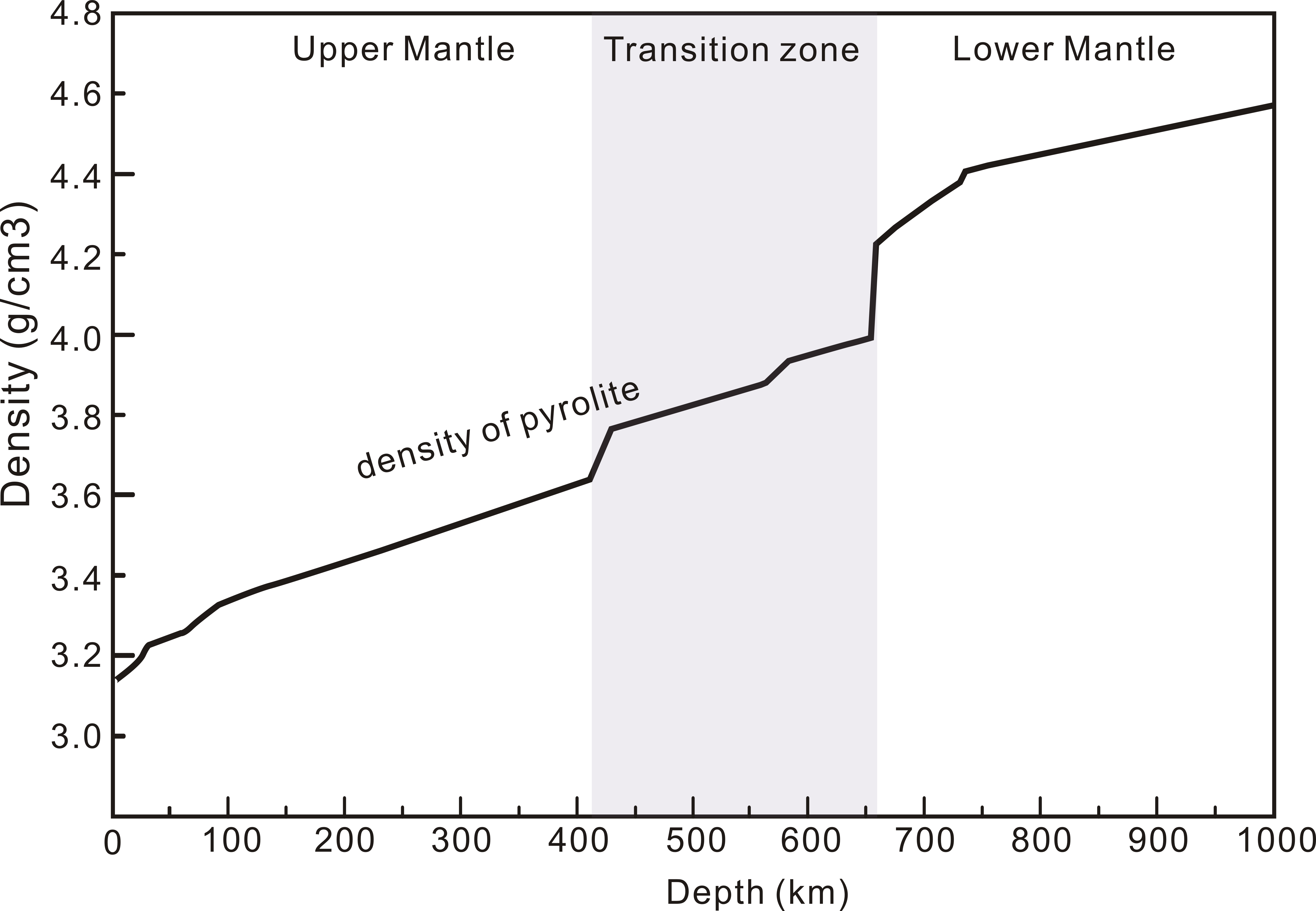
Fig. 3 Density profile of pyrolite along the 1600 K adiabatic geotherm

The P-wave and S-wave velocities (Vp and Vs) of pyrolite along the 1600 K adiabatic geotherm are shown in Fig. 2, and its density profile is shown in Fig. 3.

At the boundary between the upper mantle and the mantle transition zone (~410 km), Vp, Vs, and density jump by ~6%, ~6%, and ~4% in a pyrolite model, respectively, which are mainly attributed to the olivine-wadsleyite phase transition.

At the boundary between the mantle transition zone and the lower mantle, Vp, Vs, and density jump by ~3%, ~6%, and ~6% in a pyrolite model, respectively. With more elasticity parameters available, the Vp, Vs, and density profiles of pyrolite would be updated.

== Shortcomings ==
Whether pyrolite could represent the ambient mantle remains debated.

In the geochemical aspect, it does not satisfy trace elements or isotopic data of mid-ocean ridge basalts because the pyrolite hypothesis is based on major elements and some arbitrary assumptions (e.g. amounts of basalt and melting in the source). It may also violate mantle heterogeneity.

In the geophysical aspect, some studies suggest that seismic velocities of pyrolite do not match well with the observed global seismic models (such as preliminary reference Earth model (PREM)) in the Earth's interior, whereas some studies support the pyrolite model.

== Other mantle rock models ==
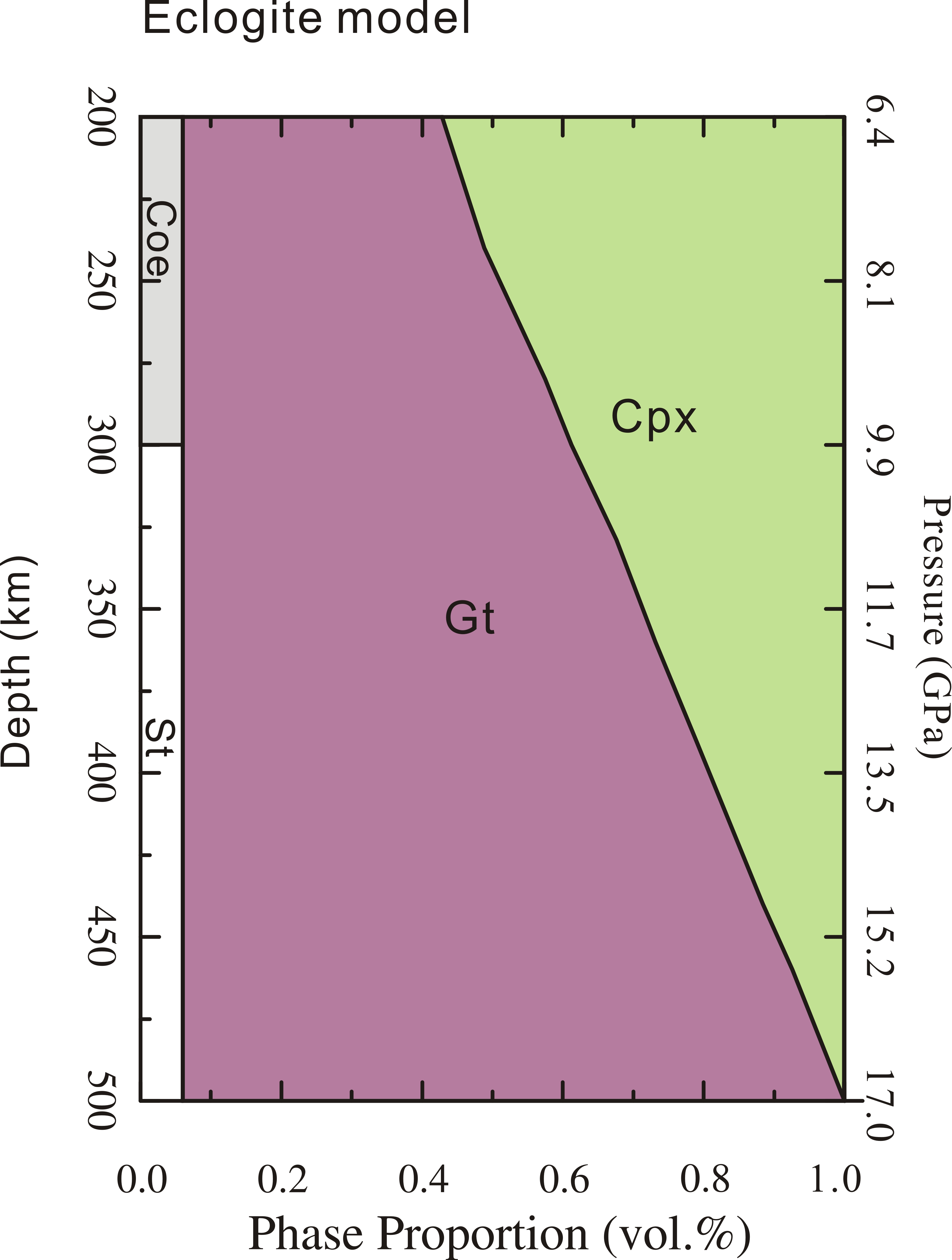
Fig. 4. Mineral proportion of a MORB-transformed eclogite at 250-500 km depth

There are other rock models for the Earth's mantle:

(1) Piclogite: by contrast to the olivine-enriched pyrolite, piclogite is an olivine-poor model (~20% olivine) proposed to provide a better match to the seismic velocity observations in the transition zone. The piclogite phase composition is similar as 20% olivine + 80% eclogite.

(2) Eclogite: is transformed from the mid-ocean ridge basalt at a depth of ~60 km, exists in the Earth's mantle mainly within the subducted slabs. It is mainly composed of garnet and clinopyroxene (mainly omphacite) up to ~500 km depth (Fig. 4).

(3) Harzburgite: mainly exists under the mid-ocean ridge basalt layer of the oceanic lithosphere, and can enter into the deep mantle along with the subducted oceanic lithosphere. Its phase composition is similar as pyrolite, but shows higher olivine proportion (~70 vol%) than pyrolite.

Overall, pyrolite and piclogite are both rock models for the ambient mantle, eclogite and harzburgite are rock models for subducted oceanic lithosphere. Formed from partial melting of pyrolite, the oceanic lithosphere is mainly composed of the basalt layer, harzburgite layer, and depleted pyrolite from top to bottom. The subducted oceanic lithospheres contribute to the heterogeneity in the Earth's mantle because they have different composition (eclogite and harzburgite) from the ambient mantle (pyrolite).

== See also ==
- Peridotite
