= Periclase =

Rocksalt, magnesium oxide mineral

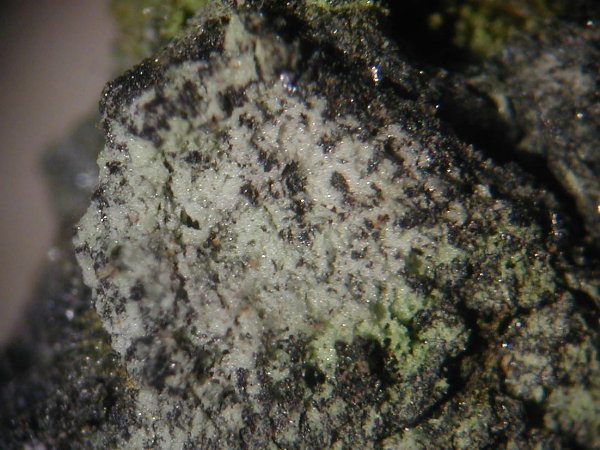
- White to light greenish periclase with black srebrodolskite from Ronneburg, Thuringia, Germany (Picture size 5 mm)

General
- Category: Oxide minerals
- Formula: MgO
- IMA symbol: Per
- Strunz classification: 4.AB.25
- Crystal system: Isometric
- Crystal class: Hexoctahedral (m3̅m); H-M symbol: (4/m 3̅ 2/m)
- Space group: Fm3̅m
- Unit cell: 4.21 Å; Z = 4

Identification
- Color: Colorless, grayish white, yellow, brownish yellow, green, black
- Crystal habit: Granular, generally occurs as anhedral to subhedral octahedral crystals in matrix
- Cleavage: {001} perfect; {111} imperfect, may exhibit parting on {011}
- Fracture: Conchoidal
- Tenacity: Brittle
- Mohs scale hardness: 6
- Luster: Vitreous
- Streak: White
- Diaphaneity: Transparent to translucent
- Specific gravity: 3.56–3.68 (meas.) 3.58 (calc.)
- Optical properties: Isotropic
- Refractive index: n = 1.735–1.745
- Other characteristics: Fluorescent, long UV=light yellow.

Periclase is a magnesium mineral that occurs naturally in contact metamorphic rocks and is a major component of most basic refractory bricks. It is a cubic form of magnesium oxide (MgO). In nature it usually forms a solid solution with wüstite (FeO) and is then referred to as ferropericlase or magnesiowüstite.

It was first described in 1840 and named from the Greek περικλάω (to break around) in allusion to its cleavage. The type locality is Monte Somma, Somma-Vesuvius Complex, Naples Province, Campania, Italy.

The old term for the mineral is magnesia. Stones from the Magnesia region in ancient Anatolia contained both magnesium oxide and hydrated magnesium carbonate as well as iron oxides (such as magnetite). Thus these stones, called Stones from Magnesia in antiquity, with their unusual magnetic properties were the reason the terms magnet and magnetism were coined.

Periclase is usually found in marble produced by metamorphism of dolomitic limestones. It readily alters to brucite under near surface conditions.

In addition to its type locality, it is reported from Predazzo, Trentino, Italy; Carlingford, County Louth, Ireland; Broadford, Skye and the island of Muck, Scotland; León, Spain; the Bellerberg Volcano, Eifel district, Germany; Nordmark and Långban, Varmland, Sweden; and Kopeysk, southern Ural Mountains, Russia. In the US it occurs at the Crestmore quarry, Riverside County, California; Tombstone, Arizona; Gabbs district, Nye County, Nevada. In Canada, it occurs at Oka, Quebec and in Australia, west of Cowell, Eyre Peninsula, South Australia.

The crystal structure of periclase corresponds to that of halite and has been studied extensively due to its simplicity. As a consequence, the physical properties of periclase are well known, which makes the mineral a popular standard in experimental work. The mineral has been shown to remain stable at pressures up to at least 360 GPa.

== Mantle occurrence ==
Ferropericlase (Mg,Fe)O makes up about 20% of the volume of the lower mantle of the Earth, which makes it the second most abundant mineral phase in that region after silicate perovskite (Mg,Fe)SiO_{3}; it also is the major host for iron in the lower mantle. At the bottom of the transition zone of the mantle, the reaction

γ–(Mg,Fe)_{2}[SiO_{4}] ↔ (Mg,Fe)[SiO_{3}] + (Mg,Fe)O

transforms γ-olivine into a mixture of perovskite and ferropericlase and vice versa. In the literature, this mineral phase of the lower mantle is also often called magnesiowüstite.
