= Akimotoite =

Rare silicate mineral in the ilmenite group of minerals

General
- Category: Oxide minerals Ilmenite group
- Formula: (Mg,Fe)SiO_{3}
- IMA symbol: Aki
- Strunz classification: 4.CB.05
- Crystal system: Trigonal
- Crystal class: Rhombohedral (3̅); H-M symbol: (3̅)
- Space group: R3̅
- Unit cell: a = 4.7284, c = 13.5591 [Å]; Z = 6

Identification
- Color: Colorless
- Cleavage: perfect (0001)
- Luster: vitreous
- Streak: white or colorless
- Diaphaneity: Transparent
- Specific gravity: 3.81(calculated)

Akimotoite is a rare silicate mineral in the ilmenite group of minerals, with the chemical formula (Mg,Fe)SiO_{3}. It is polymorphous with pyroxene and with bridgmanite, a natural silicate perovskite that is the most abundant mineral in Earth's silicate mantle. Akimotoite has a vitreous luster, is colorless, and has a white or colorless streak. It crystallizes in the trigonal crystal system in space group R3̅. It is the silicon analogue of geikielite (MgTiO_{3}).

== Crystal structure ==
The crystal structure is similar to that of ilmenite (FeTiO_{3}) with Si and Mg in regular octahedral coordination with oxygen. The Si and Mg octahedra align in discrete layers alternating up the c-axis. The space group is R3̅ (trigonal) with a = 4.7284 Å; c = 13.5591 Å; V = 262.94 Å^{3}; Z = 6.

== Occurrence ==
Akimotoite was found in the Tenham meteorites in Queensland, Australia. It is believed to have formed as the result of an extraterrestrial shock event. It is the silicon analogue of geikielite (MgTiO_{3}). It was named after physicist Syun-iti Akimoto (also known as Shun'ichi Akimoto (秋本 俊一)) (1925–2004), University of Tokyo.

It has also been reported from the Sixiangkou meteorite in the Gaogang District, Jiangsu Province, Taizhou Prefecture, China; the Zagami Martian meteorite, Katsina State, Nigeria and from the Umbarger meteorite, Randall County, Texas.

Akimotoite is believed to be a significant mineral in the Earth's mantle at depths of 600–800 kilometres (370–500 mi) in cooler regions of the mantle such as where a subducted slab enters into the lower mantle. Akimotoite is elastically anisotropic and has been suggested as a cause of seismic anisotropy in the lower transition zone and uppermost lower mantle.

== See also ==
- Glossary of meteoritics
