= Mesoplates =

The term "mesoplates" has been applied in two different contexts within geology and geophysics. The first is applicable to much of the Earth's mantle, and the second to distinct layering within the Earth's crust.

== Rheological model ==
In 1977 researchers M. Kumazawa and Y. Fukao introduced the term "mesoplate" in the context of what they termed a "Dual Plate Tectonic Model." Their rationale is a postulated low-velocity zone near and above the 650 km discontinuity with additional properties including local low melting temperature, active chemical migration and fractionation, and low-viscosity. They further write,

"These features lead to a concept of dual plate tectonics models. The layer between the 200- and 550-km depths is sandwiched between two relatively soft layers (upper and lower LVZs) and is expected to behave as a rigid plate (mesoplate)."

== Kinematic model ==
From a kinematic perspective, the concept of "mesoplates" was applied as a heuristic for characterizing the motion of lithospheric plates relative to the sublithospheric source region of hotspot volcanism (Pilger, 2003), or more simply: kinematically rigid layers within the mesosphere, beneath one or more plates. W. Jason Morgan (1972), originally suggested that hotspots (inferred by J. Tuzo Wilson) beneath such active volcanic regions as Hawaii and Iceland form a fixed "absolute" frame of reference for the motion of the overlying plates. However, the existence of a globally fixed reference frame for island-seamount chains and aseismic ridges ("traces") that are inferred to have originated from hotspots was quickly discounted by the primitive plate reconstructions available in the mid-1970s (Molnar and Atwater, 1973). Further, paleomagnetic measurements imply that hotspots have moved relative to the magnetic poles of the Earth (the magnetic poles are further inferred to correspond with the rotational poles of the planet when averaged over thousands of years). Aside: the term "hotspot" is used herein without any genetic implications. The term "melting spot" might well be more applicable.

=== Development of the kinematic concept ===
As plate reconstructions have improved over the succeeding three decades since Morgan's original contribution, it is become apparent that the hotspots beneath the central North and South Atlantic and Indian Oceans may form one, distinct frame of reference, while those underlying the plates beneath the Pacific Ocean form a separate reference frame. For convenience, the hotspots beneath the Pacific Ocean are referred to as the "Hawaiian set" after Hawaii, while those beneath much of the Atlantic and Indian Ocean are called the "Tristan set" after the island of Tristan da Cunha (the Tristan hotspot), one of the principal inferred hotspots of the set. Within a single hotspot set, the traces tied to their originating hotspot can be fit by plate reconstructions which imply only minor relative motion among the hotspots for perhaps the past 130 m.y. (million years) for the Tristan set and 80 m.y. for the Hawaiian set. However, the two hotspot sets are inconsistent with the hypothesis of a single hotspot reference frame; distinct motion between the two sets is apparent between 80 and 30 Ma (m.y. before Present; e.g., Raymond, et al., 2000).

It is important to acknowledge that radiometric dating of volcanism along hotspot traces may or may not accurately and precisely constrain the position of the plate above the underlying hotspot at the analytically produced age. However, reconstruction models for the Hawaiian set are constrained in age by the hotspot beneath Easter Island and its traces on the Pacific and Nazca plates between approximately 50 and 30 Ma, as the hotspot was beneath the spreading center during that time interval, and resulting relative plate reconstructions constrain motion of the plates relative to the hotspot. Prior to 50 Ma and since 30 Ma, reconstructions can be determined that fit virtually all existing Hawaiian set traces; the actual ages have the greatest uncertainty. Similarly, plate reconstructions relative to the Tristan set are best constrained in age by relative plate reconstructions, a fortuitous consequence of spherical plate tectonics of three or more plates.

Lithospheric plates are recognized in terms of their lack of internal deformation. Thus two points on the same plate will not move relative to one another, even if the plate moves relative to another plate (or relative to the Earth's rotational poles). Plates are not explicitly defined in terms of their mechanical properties. In a sense, then, "plates" are a heuristic—rather like fitting a straight line through a set of points without a clear functional relationship. Analogously, the term "mesoplate" was introduced. Since the hotspots of the Hawaiian set appear to form a frame of reference (like points on a lithospheric plate, they don't appear to be moving at a very great rate relative to one another), the hotspots and that part of the upper mantle in which they are embedded is termed the "Hawaiian mesoplate". The "Tristan mesoplate" is similarly defined. A third mesoplate, "Icelandic", is inferred to underlie the northernmost Atlantic Ocean, the Arctic Ocean, much of Eurasia to the north of the Alps and Himalayas; since the Iceland hotspot trace is not consistent with either the Hawaiian or Tristan set.

Additional evidence for mesoplates comes from observations that intraplate stresses in stable continental interiors of North America and Africa are consistent with plate motions in the Tristan hotspot frame. This observation was first made for contemporary stresses (the maximum horizontal principal compressive stress – sigma-hx); and also appears to hold for paleostress indicators between approximately 100 and 20 Ma (Pilger, 2003). This observation implies that the sublithospheric mantle over which the plates are moving comprises the same reference frame in which the hotspots are embedded.

The mesoplate heuristic is very much a hypothetical construct. Several observations could discount it. It is conceivable that a missing plate boundary between the plates beneath the Pacific and those beneath the Atlantic and Indian Oceans might be hidden and responsible for the discrepancy between the two hotspot sets. However, progressive study of the most likely region for such a boundary has failed to find it.

The origin of hotspots, whether from deep mantle plumes, mid-mantle melting anomalies, or intraplate fractures, is constrained somewhat by the mesoplate hypothesis. The principal alternative models for the origin of hotspot traces, propagating fractures, are still actively advocated by many workers (see mantleplumes.org). Such a model does not explicitly recognize sublithospheric reference frames. However, it cannot completely explain all of the features of the most familiar hotspot traces.

The mantle plume hypothesis for the origin of hotspots need not be inconsistent with mesoplates. However, it would need to be modified to recognize that the lack of motion between hotspots represents a kind of "embedding" of the "plume" in the upper mantle (shallow mesosphere) of the Earth. One of Morgan's rationales for plumes was the existence of an "absolute motion" reference frame. Numerical modeling now indicates that such a reference frame would be unlikely in the context of plume convection.

If continued research were to demonstrate the continued applicability of the mesoplate hypothesis, it would have important implications for the nature of convection in the upper mantle: Convective motion beneath plates is almost entirely vertical within individual mesoplates; lateral motion in the mantle would be confined to mesoplate boundaries and to greater depths.

== Crustal model ==
Phipps coined the term "crustal mesoplate tectonics" as applied to brittle crust detached from inferred more ductile lower crust. The analogy between lithoplate tectonics and crustal deformation engaging both brittle and ductile components leads to the concept of crustal mesoplates.

== Origin of the term ==
“Mesoplates” is a combination and contraction of two terms: “mesosphere”, as applied to the solid earth, and “tectonic plates”.

== Mesosphere (solid earth) ==
“Mesosphere” (not to be confused with mesosphere, a layer of the atmosphere) is derived from “mesospheric shell”, coined by Reginald Aldworth Daly, a Harvard University geology professor. In the pre-plate tectonics era, Daly (1940) inferred three spherical layers comprise the outer Earth: lithosphere (including the crust), asthenosphere, and mesospheric shell. Daly's hypothetical depths to the lithosphere–asthenosphere boundary ranged from 80 to 100 km and the top of the mesospheric shell (base of the asthenosphere) from 200 to 480 km. Thus, Daly's asthenosphere was inferred to be 120 to 400 km thick. According to Daly, the base of the solid earth mesosphere could extend to the base of the mantle (and, thus, to the top of the core).

Isacks, Oliver, and Sykes (1968) applied lithosphere and asthenosphere to their conception to the “New Global Tectonics” or what subsequently became known as plate tectonics. In their conception, the base of the asthenosphere extended as deep as the deepest (650–700 km) earthquakes in the inclined seismic zones where descending lithospheric plates penetrate the upper mantle.

== Lithospheric (tectonic) plate (or lithoplate) ==
The (spherical) lithospheric plates of plate tectonics are so defined because they behave in a kinematically rigid manner. That is, any three points on the same plate do not move relative to one another, while the plate itself (and all points it contains) may move relative to other plates or other internal reference frames (e.g., the earth's spin axis or geomagnetic poles). In other words, ideal lithospheric plates do not deform internally as they move.

A “mesoplate”, then behaves like lithospheric plates: empirical evidence (discussed above) indicates groups of melting anomalies (hotspots) embedded in the shallow mesosphere do not move relative to one another, but collectively move relative to other hotspot groups and relative to overlying lithospheric plates.

== See also ==
- Rheology
