= Post-perovskite =

High-pressure phase of magnesium silicate

Post-perovskite (pPv) is a high-pressure phase of magnesium silicate (MgSiO_{3}). It is composed of the prime oxide constituents of the Earth's rocky mantle (MgO and SiO_{2}), and its pressure and temperature for stability imply that it is likely to occur in portions of the lowermost few hundred km of Earth's mantle.

The post-perovskite phase has implications for the D′′ layer, which influences the convective mixing in the mantle responsible for plate tectonics.

Post-perovskite has the same crystal structure as the synthetic solid compound CaIrO_{3} (calcium iridate(IV)), and is often referred to as the "CaIrO_{3}-type phase of MgSiO_{3}" in the literature. The crystal system of post-perovskite is orthorhombic, its space group is Cmcm, and its structure is a stacked SiO_{6}-octahedral sheet along the b axis. The name "post-perovskite" derives from silicate perovskite, the stable phase of MgSiO_{3} throughout most of Earth's mantle, which has the perovskite structure. The prefix "post-" refers to the fact that it occurs after perovskite structured MgSiO_{3} as pressure increases (and historically, the progression of high pressure mineral physics). At upper mantle pressures, nearest Earth's surface, MgSiO_{3} persists as the silicate mineral enstatite, a pyroxene rock forming mineral found in igneous and metamorphic rocks of the crust.

== History ==
The CaIrO_{3}-type phase of MgSiO_{3} phase was discovered in 2004 using the laser-heated diamond anvil cell (LHDAC) technique by a group at the Tokyo Institute of Technology and, independently, by researchers from the Swiss Federal Institute of Technology (ETH Zurich) and Japan Agency for Marine-Earth Science and Technology who used a combination of quantum-mechanical simulations and LHDAC experiments. The TIT group's paper appeared in the journal Science. The ETH/JAM-EST collaborative paper and TIT group's second paper appeared two months later in the journal Nature. This simultaneous discovery was preceded by S. Ono's experimental discovery of a similar phase, possessing exactly the same structure, in Fe_{2}O_{3}.

== Importance in Earth's mantle ==
Post-perovskite phase is stable above 120 GPa at 2500 K, and exhibits a positive Clapeyron slope such that the transformation pressure increases with temperature. Because these conditions correspond to a depth of about 2600 km and the D" seismic discontinuity occurs at similar depths, the perovskite to post-perovskite phase change is considered to be the origin of such seismic discontinuities in this region. Post-perovskite also holds great promise for mapping experimentally determined information regarding the temperatures and pressures of its transformation into direct information regarding temperature variations in the D" layer once the seismic discontinuities attributed to this transformation have been sufficiently mapped out. Such information can be used, for example, to:

1) better constrain the amount of heat leaving Earth's core
2) determine whether or not subducted slabs of oceanic lithosphere reach the base of the mantle
3) help delineate the degree of chemical heterogeneity in the lower mantle
4) find out whether or not the lowermost mantle is unstable to convective instabilities that result in upwelling hot thermal plumes of rock which rise up and possibly trace out volcanic hot spot tracks at Earth's surface.

For these reasons the finding of the MgSiO_{3}-post-perovskite phase transition is considered by many geophysicists to be the most important discovery in deep Earth science in several decades, and was only made possible by the concerted efforts of mineral physics scientists around the world as they sought to increase the range and quality of LHDAC experiments and as ab initio calculations attained predictive power.

== Physical properties ==
The sheet structure of post-perovskite makes the compressibility of the b axis higher than that of the a or c axis. This anisotropy may yield the morphology of a platy crystal habit parallel to the (010) plane; the seismic anisotropy observed in the D" region might qualitatively (but not quantitatively) be explained by this characteristic. Theory predicted the (110) slip associated with particularly favorable stacking faults and confirmed by later experiments. Some theorists predicted other slip systems, which await experimental confirmation. In 2005 and 2006 Ono and Oganov published two papers predicting that post-perovskite should have high electrical conductivity, perhaps two orders of magnitude higher than perovskite's conductivity. In 2008 Hirose's group published an experimental report confirming this prediction.

== Chemical properties ==
Another potentially important effect that needs to be better characterized for the post-perovskite phase transition is the influence of other chemical components that are known to be present to some degree in Earth's lowermost mantle. The phase transition pressure (characterized by a two-phase loop in this system), was initially thought to decrease as the FeO content increases, but some recent experiments suggest the opposite. However, it is possible that the effect of Fe_{2}O_{3} is more relevant as most of iron in post-perovskite is likely to be trivalent (ferric). Such components as Al_{2}O_{3} or the more oxidized Fe_{2}O_{3} also affect the phase transition pressure, and might have strong mutual interactions with one another. The influence of variable chemistry present in the Earth's lowermost mantle upon the post-perovskite phase transition raises the issue of both thermal and chemical modulation of its possible appearance (along with any associated discontinuities) in the D" layer.

== Summary ==
Experimental and theoretical work on the perovskite/post-perovskite phase transition continues, while many important features of this phase transition remain ill-constrained. For example, the Clapeyron slope (characterized by the Clausius–Clapeyron relation) describing the increase in the pressure of the phase transition with increasing temperature is known to be relatively high in comparison to other solid-solid phase transitions in the Earth's mantle, however, the experimentally determined value varies from about 5 MPa/K to as high as 13 MPa/K. Ab initio calculations give a tighter range, between 7.5 MPa/K and 9.6 MPa/K, and are probably the most reliable estimates available today. The difference between experimental estimates arises primarily because different materials were used as pressure standards in Diamond Anvil Cell experiments. A well-characterized equation of state for the pressure standard, when combined with high energy synchrotron generated X-ray diffraction patterns of the pressure standard (which is mixed in with the experimental sample material), yields information on the pressure-temperature conditions of the experiment. However, as these extreme pressures and temperatures have not been sufficiently explored in experiments, the equations of state for many popular pressure standards are not yet well characterized and often yield different results. Another source of uncertainty in LHDAC experiments is the measurement of temperature from a sample's thermal radiation, which is required to obtain the pressure from the equation of state of the pressure standard. In laser-heated experiments at such high pressures (over 1 million atmospheres), the samples are necessarily small and numerous approximations (e.g., gray body) are required to obtain estimates of the temperature.

== See also ==
- Ferropericlase
