= Upper mantle =

Very thick layer of rock inside Earth

Diagram of the geological process of subduction showing upper mantle

The upper mantle of Earth is a thick layer of rock inside the planet, which begins just beneath the crust (at about 10 km (6.2 mi) under the oceans, and about 35 km (22 mi) under the continents) and ends at the top of the lower mantle, at about 670 km (420 mi). Temperatures range from around 900 °C (1,170 K; 1,650 °F) at the upper boundary with the crust to around 1,200 °C (1,470 K; 2,190 °F) at the boundary with the lower mantle. Upper mantle material that has come up onto the surface comprises about 55% olivine, 35% pyroxene, and 5–10% of calcium oxide and aluminum oxide minerals such as plagioclase, spinel, or garnet, depending on depth.

== Seismic structure ==
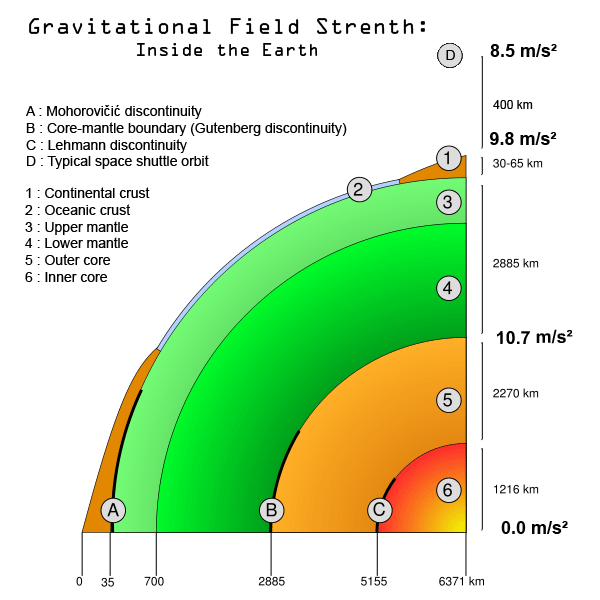
1 = continental crust, 2 = oceanic crust, 3 = upper mantle, 4 = lower mantle, 5+6 = core, A = crust-mantle boundary (Mohorovičić discontinuity)

The density profile through Earth is determined by the velocity of seismic waves. Density increases progressively in each layer, largely due to compression of the rock at increased depths. Abrupt changes in density occur where the material composition changes.

The upper mantle begins just beneath the crust and ends at the top of the lower mantle. The upper mantle causes the tectonic plates to move.

Crust and mantle are distinguished by composition, while the lithosphere and asthenosphere are defined by a change in mechanical properties.

The top of the mantle is defined by a sudden increase in the speed of seismic waves, which Andrija Mohorovičić first noted in 1909; this boundary is now referred to as the Mohorovičić discontinuity or "Moho."

The Moho defines the base of the crust and varies from 10 km (6.2 mi) to 70 km (43 mi) below the surface of the Earth. Oceanic crust is thinner than continental crust and is generally less than 10 km (6.2 mi) thick. Continental crust is about 35 km (22 mi) thick, but the large crustal root under the Tibetan Plateau is approximately 70 km (43 mi) thick.

The thickness of the upper mantle is about 640 km (400 mi). The entire mantle is about 2,900 km (1,800 mi) thick, which means the upper mantle is only about 20% of the total mantle thickness.

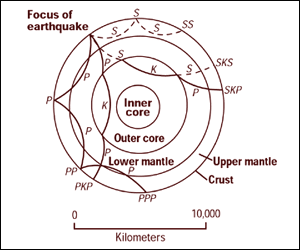
Cross-section of the Earth, showing the paths of earthquake waves. The paths curve because the different rock types found at different depths change the waves' speed. S waves do not travel through the core

The boundary between the upper and lower mantle is a 670 km (420 mi) discontinuity. Earthquakes at shallow depths result from strike-slip faulting; however, below about 50 km (31 mi), the hot, high-pressure conditions inhibit further seismicity. The mantle is viscous and incapable of faulting. However, in subduction zones, earthquakes are observed down to 670 km (420 mi).

=== Lehmann discontinuity ===
The Lehmann discontinuity is an abrupt increase of P-wave and S-wave velocities at a depth of 220 km (140 mi) (Note that this is a different "Lehmann discontinuity" than the one between the Earth's inner and outer cores labeled in the image on the right.)

=== Transition zone ===
The transition zone is located between the upper mantle and the lower mantle between a depth of 410 km (250 mi) and 670 km (420 mi).

This is thought to occur as a result of the rearrangement of grains in olivine to form a denser crystal structure as a result of the increase in pressure with increasing depth. Below a depth of 670 km (420 mi), due to pressure changes, ringwoodite minerals change into two new denser phases, bridgmanite and periclase. This can be seen using body waves from earthquakes, which are converted, reflected, or refracted at the boundary, and predicted from mineral physics, as the phase changes are temperature and density-dependent and hence depth-dependent.

=== 410 km discontinuity ===
A single peak is seen in all seismological data at 410 km (250 mi), which is predicted by the single transition from α- to β- Mg_{2}SiO_{4} (olivine to wadsleyite). From the Clapeyron slope this discontinuity is expected to be shallower in cold regions, such as subducting slabs, and deeper in warmer regions, such as mantle plumes.

=== 670 km discontinuity ===
This is the most complex discontinuity and marks the boundary between the upper and lower mantle. It appears in PP precursors (a wave that reflects off the discontinuity once) only in certain regions but is always apparent in SS precursors. It is seen as single and double reflections in receiver functions for P to S conversions over a broad range of depths (640–720 km, or 397–447 mi). The Clapeyron slope predicts a deeper discontinuity in colder regions and a shallower discontinuity in hotter regions. This discontinuity is generally linked to the transition from ringwoodite to bridgmanite and periclase. This is thermodynamically an endothermic reaction and creates a viscosity jump. Both characteristics cause this phase transition to play an important role in geodynamical models.

=== Other discontinuities ===
There is another major phase transition predicted at 520 km (320 mi) for the transition of olivine (β to γ) and garnet in the pyrolite mantle. This one has only sporadically been observed in seismological data.

Other non-global phase transitions have been suggested at a range of depths.

== Temperature and pressure ==
Temperatures range from approximately 500 K (227 °C; 440 °F) at the upper boundary with the crust to approximately 4,200 K (3,930 °C; 7,100 °F) at the core-mantle boundary. The highest temperature of the upper mantle is 1,200 K (930 °C; 1,700 °F).

Although the high temperature far exceeds the melting points of the mantle rocks at the surface, the mantle is almost exclusively solid. The enormous lithostatic pressure exerted on the mantle prevents melting because the temperature at which melting begins (the solidus) increases with pressure. Pressure increases as depth increases since the material beneath has to support the weight of all the material above it. The entire mantle is thought to deform like a fluid on long timescales, with permanent plastic deformation.

The highest pressure of the upper mantle is 24.0 GPa (237,000 atm) compared to the bottom of the mantle, which is 136 GPa (1,340,000 atm).

Estimates for the viscosity of the upper mantle range between 10^{19} and 10^{24} Pa·s, depending on depth, temperature, composition, state of stress, and numerous other factors. The upper mantle can only flow very slowly. However, when large forces are applied to the uppermost mantle, it can become weaker, and this effect is thought to be important in allowing the formation of tectonic plate boundaries.

Although there is a tendency to larger viscosity at greater depth, this relation is far from linear and shows layers with dramatically decreased viscosity, in particular in the upper mantle and at the boundary with the core.

== Movement ==
Because of the temperature difference between the Earth's surface and outer core and the ability of the crystalline rocks at high pressure and temperature to undergo slow, creeping, viscous-like deformation over millions of years, there is a convective material circulation in the mantle.

Hot material upwells, while cooler (and heavier) material sinks downward. Downward motion of material occurs at convergent plate boundaries called subduction zones. Locations on the surface that lie over plumes are predicted to have high elevation (because of the buoyancy of the hotter, less-dense plume beneath) and to exhibit hot spot volcanism.

== Mineral composition ==
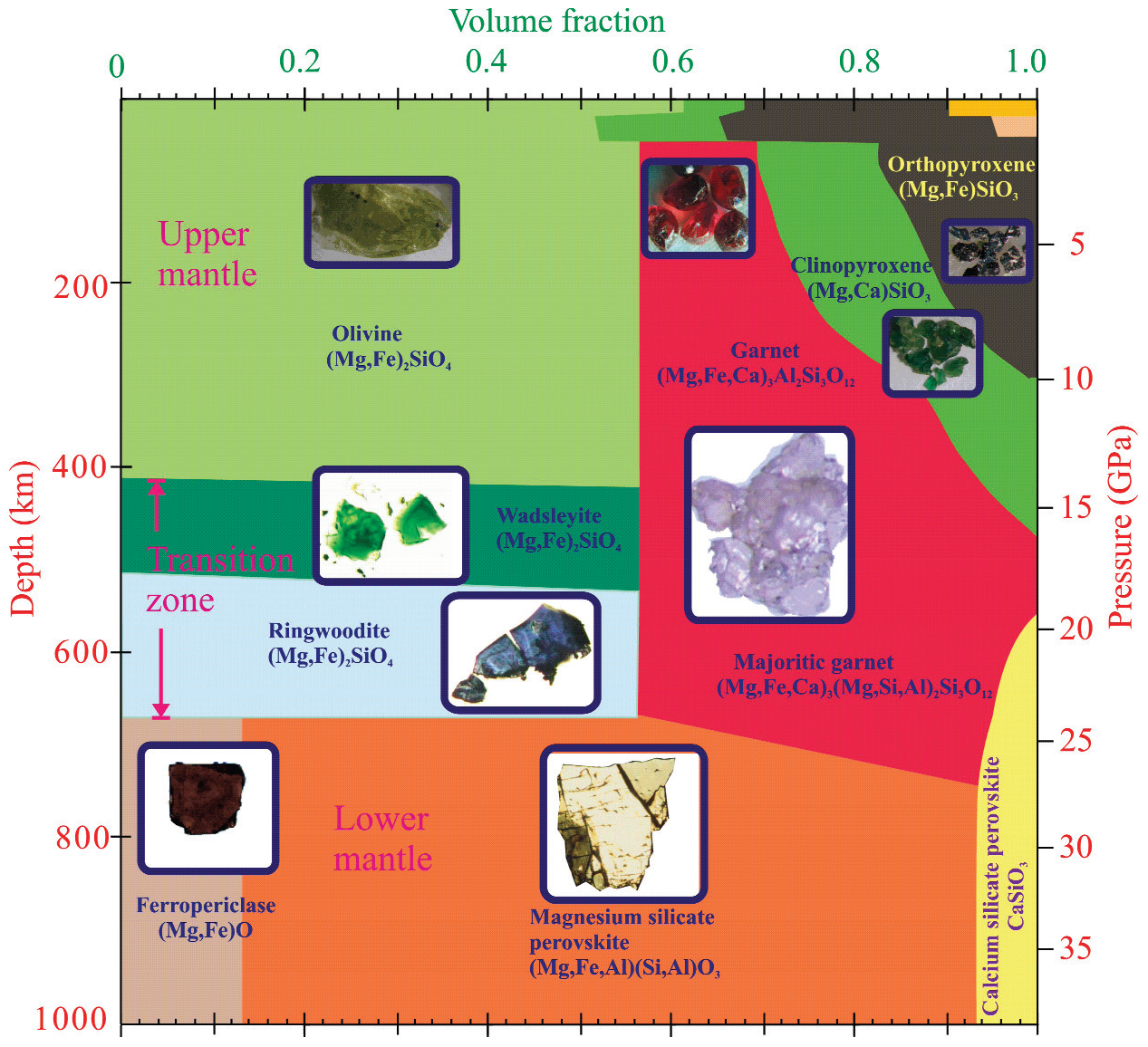
Pyrolitic mantle mineralogy as a function of mineral volume fraction and depth variation.

The seismic data is not sufficient to determine the composition of the mantle. Observations of rocks exposed on the surface and other evidence reveal that the upper mantle is mafic minerals olivine and pyroxene, and it has a density of about 3.33 g/cm^{3} (0.120 lb/cu in)

Upper mantle material that has come up onto the surface comprises about 55% olivine and 35% pyroxene, and 5 to 10% of calcium oxide and aluminum oxide. The upper mantle is dominantly peridotite, composed primarily of variable proportions of the minerals olivine, clinopyroxene, orthopyroxene, and an aluminous phase. The aluminous phase is plagioclase in the uppermost mantle, then spinel, and then garnet below about 100 kilometres (62 mi). Gradually through the upper mantle, pyroxenes become less stable and transform into majoritic garnet.

Experiments on olivines and pyroxenes show that these minerals change the structure as pressure increases at greater depth, which explains why the density curves are not perfectly smooth. When there is a conversion to a more dense mineral structure, the seismic velocity rises abruptly and creates a discontinuity.

At the top of the transition zone, olivine undergoes isochemical phase transitions to wadsleyite and ringwoodite. Unlike nominally anhydrous olivine, these high-pressure olivine polymorphs have a large capacity to store water in their crystal structure. This has led to the hypothesis that the transition zone may host a large quantity of water.

In Earth's interior, olivine occurs in the upper mantle at depths less than 410 kilometres (250 mi), and ringwoodite is inferred within the transition zone from about 520 to 670 kilometres (320 to 420 mi) depth. Seismic activity discontinuities at about 410 kilometres (250 mi), 520 kilometres (320 mi), and 670 kilometres (420 mi) depth have been attributed to phase changes involving olivine and its polymorphs.

At the base of the transition zone, ringwoodite decomposes into bridgmanite (formerly called magnesium silicate perovskite), and ferropericlase. Garnet also becomes unstable at or slightly below the base of the transition zone.

Kimberlites explode from the earth's interior and sometimes carry rock fragments. Some of these xenolithic fragments are diamonds that can only come from the higher pressures below the crust. The rocks that come with this are ultramafic nodules and peridotite.

== Chemical composition ==
The composition seems to be very similar to the crust. One difference is that rocks and minerals of the mantle tend to have more magnesium and less silicon and aluminum than the crust. The first four most abundant elements in the upper mantle are oxygen, magnesium, silicon, and iron.

Composition of the Earth's upper mantle (depleted MORB)
Compound	Mass percent
SiO_{2}	44.71
MgO	38.73
FeO	8.18
Al_{2}O_{3}	3.98
CaO	3.17
Cr_{2}O_{3}	0.57
NiO	0.24
MnO	0.13
Na_{2}O	0.13
TiO_{2}	0.13
P_{2}O_{5}	0.019
K_{2}O	0.006

== Exploration ==
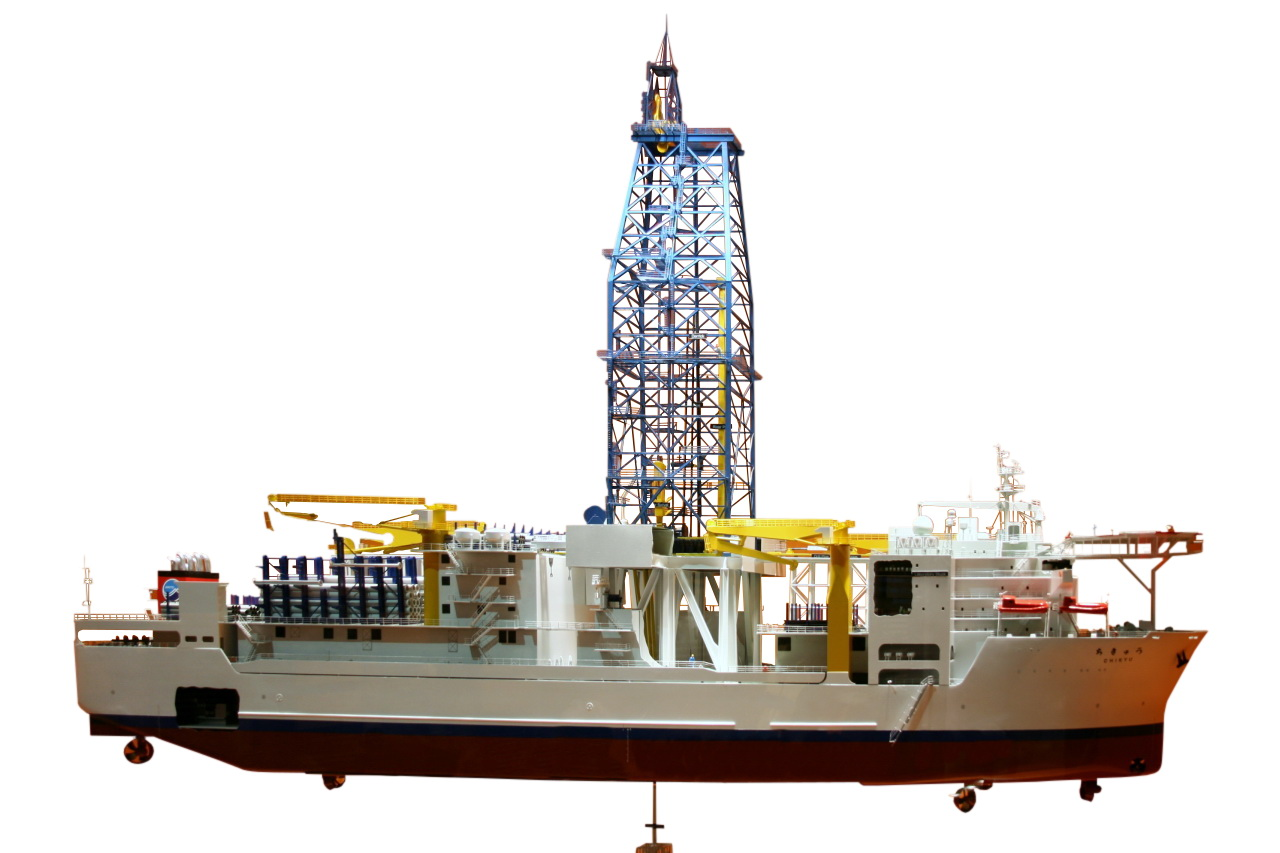
Chikyu drilling ship

Exploration of the mantle is generally conducted at the seabed rather than on land because of the oceanic crust's relative thinness as compared to the significantly thicker continental crust.

The first attempt at mantle exploration, known as Project Mohole, was abandoned in 1966 after repeated failures and cost overruns. The deepest penetration was approximately 180 m (590 ft). In 2005 an oceanic borehole reached 1,416 metres (4,646 ft) below the seafloor from the ocean drilling vessel JOIDES Resolution.

On 5 March 2007, a team of scientists on board the RRS James Cook embarked on a voyage to an area of the Atlantic seafloor where the mantle lies exposed without any crust covering, midway between the Cape Verde Islands and the Caribbean Sea. The exposed site lies approximately 3 kilometres (1.9 mi) beneath the ocean surface and covers thousands of square kilometers.

The Chikyu Hakken mission attempted to use the Japanese vessel Chikyū to drill up to 7,000 m (23,000 ft) below the seabed. On 27 April 2012, Chikyū drilled to a depth of 7,740 metres (25,390 ft) below sea level, setting a new world record for deep-sea drilling. This record has since been surpassed by the ill-fated Deepwater Horizon mobile offshore drilling unit, operating on the Tiber prospect in the Mississippi Canyon Field, United States Gulf of Mexico, when it achieved a world record for total length for a vertical drilling string of 10,062 m (33,011 ft). The previous record was held by the U.S. vessel Glomar Challenger, which in 1978 drilled to 7,049.5 meters (23,130 feet) below sea level in the Mariana Trench. On 6 September 2012, Scientific deep-sea drilling vessel Chikyū set a new world record by drilling down and obtaining rock samples from deeper than 2,111 metres (6,926 ft) below the seafloor off the Shimokita Peninsula of Japan in the northwest Pacific Ocean.

A novel method of exploring the uppermost few hundred kilometers of the Earth was proposed in 2005, consisting of a small, dense, heat-generating probe that melts its way down through the crust and mantle while its position and progress are tracked by acoustic signals generated in the rocks. The probe consists of an outer sphere of tungsten about 1 metre (3 ft 3 in) in diameter with a cobalt-60 interior acting as a radioactive heat source. This should take half a year to reach the oceanic Moho.

Exploration can also be aided through computer simulations of the evolution of the mantle. In 2009, a supercomputer application provided new insight into the distribution of mineral deposits, especially isotopes of iron, from when the mantle developed 4.5 billion years ago.

In 2023 JOIDES Resolution recovered cores of what appeared to be rock from the upper mantle after drilling only a few hundred meters into the Atlantis Massif. The borehole reached a maximum depth of 1,268 meters and recovered 886 meters of rock samples consisting of primarily peridotite. There is debate over the extent to which the samples represent the upper mantle with some arguing the effects of seawater on the samples situates them as examples of deep lower crust. However, the samples offer a much closer analogue to mantle rock than magmatic xenoliths as the sampled rock never melted into magma or recrystallized.
