= Preliminary reference Earth model =

Model representing the average Earth properties as a function of planetary radius

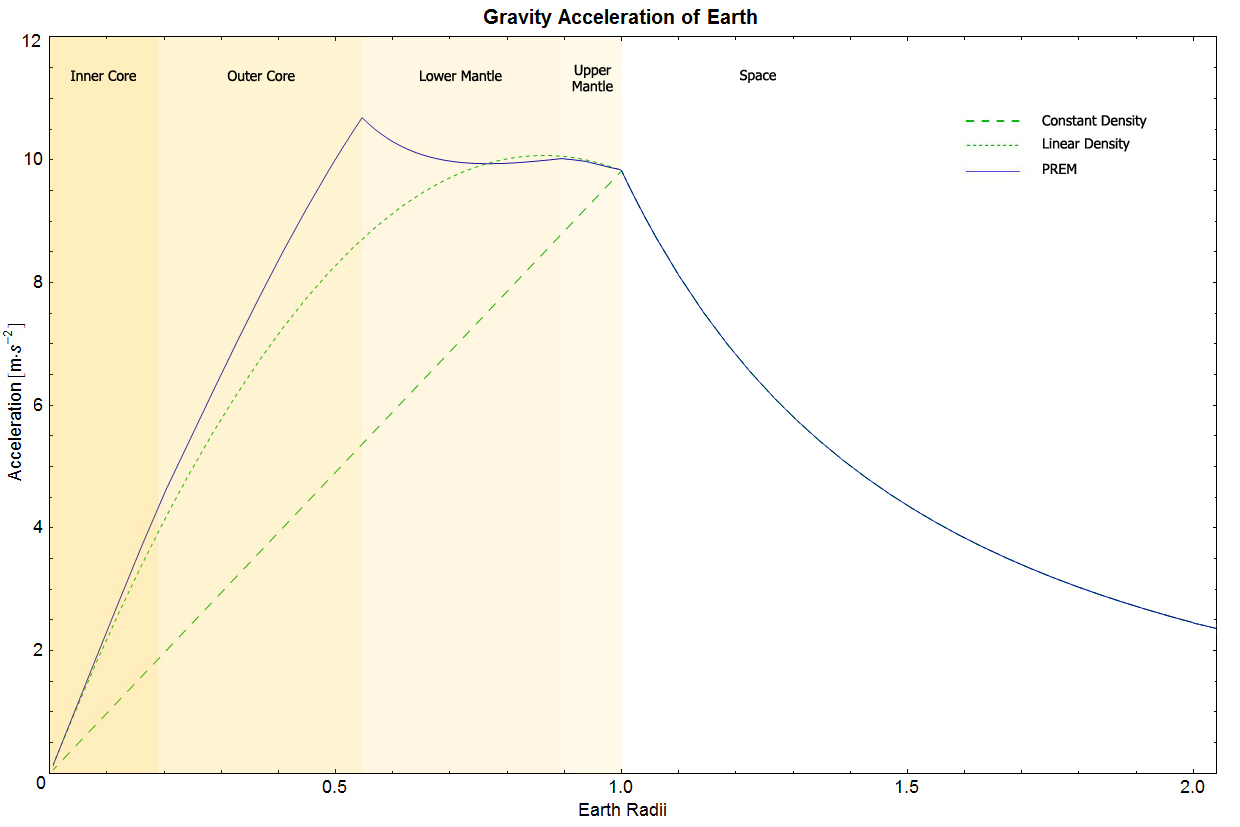
Earth's Gravity according to PREM. Green curves show hypothetical Earths with density constant (dashed) and decreasing linearly from center to surface (stippled)

The preliminary reference Earth model (PREM) plots the average of Earth's properties by depth. It includes a table of Earth properties, including elastic properties, attenuation, density, pressure, and gravity.

PREM has been widely used as the basis for seismic tomography and related global geophysical models. It incorporates anelastic dispersion and anisotropy and therefore it is frequency-dependent and transversely isotropic for the upper mantle.

PREM was developed by Adam M. Dziewonski and Don L. Anderson in response to guidelines of a "Standard Earth Model Committee" of the International Association of Geodesy (IAG) and the International Association of Seismology and Physics of the Earth's Interior (IASPEI) Other Earth reference models include iasp91 and ak135.
