= Lower mantle =

Region from 660 to 2900 km below Earth's surface

Structure of Earth, with the lower mantle labelled

The lower mantle, historically also called the mesosphere, occupies about 56% of the total volume of Earth, and is the region from 660 to 2,890 km (410 to 1,800 mi) below Earth's surface; between the transition zone and the outer core. The preliminary reference Earth model (PREM) separates the lower mantle into three sections, the uppermost (660–770 km (410–480 mi)), mid-lower mantle (770–2,700 km (480–1,680 mi)), and the D layer (2,700–2,890 km (1,680–1,800 mi)).

Pressure and temperature in the lower mantle range from 24–127 GPa (3,500,000–18,400,000 psi) and 1,900–2,600 °C (2,170–2,870 K; 3,450–4,710 °F). It has been proposed that the composition of the lower mantle is pyrolitic, containing three major phases of bridgmanite, ferropericlase, and davemaoite. The high pressure in the lower mantle has been shown to induce a spin transition of iron-bearing bridgmanite and ferropericlase, which may affect both mantle plume dynamics and lower mantle chemistry. The mantle moves at about 1 cm (0.39 in) per year.

The upper boundary is defined by the sharp increase in seismic wave velocities and density at a depth of 660 km (410 mi). At a depth of 660 km (410 mi), ringwoodite γ-((Mg,Fe)_{2}SiO_{4}) decomposes into Mg-Si perovskite and magnesiowüstite. This reaction marks the boundary between the upper mantle and lower mantle. This measurement is estimated from seismic data and high-pressure laboratory experiments. The base of the mesosphere includes the D″ zone which lies just above the mantle–core boundary at around 2,700–2,890 km (1,678–1,796 mi).

== Physical properties ==
The lower mantle was initially labelled as the D-layer in Bullen's spherically symmetric model of the Earth. The PREM seismic model of the Earth's interior separated the D-layer into three distinctive layers defined by the discontinuity in seismic wave velocities:

- 660–770 km: A discontinuity in compression wave velocity (6–11%) followed by a steep gradient is indicative of the transformation of the mineral ringwoodite to bridgmanite and ferropericlase and the transition between the transition zone layer to the lower mantle.
- 770–2700 km: A gradual increase in velocity indicative of the adiabatic compression of the mineral phases in the lower mantle.
- 2700–2900 km: The D-layer is considered the transition from the lower mantle to the outer core.

The temperature of the lower mantle ranges from 1,960 K (1,690 °C; 3,070 °F) at the topmost layer to 2,630 K (2,360 °C; 4,270 °F) at a depth of 2,700 kilometres (1,700 mi). Models of the temperature of the lower mantle approximate convection as the primary heat transport contribution, while conduction and radiative heat transfer are considered negligible. As a result, the lower mantle's temperature gradient as a function of depth is approximately adiabatic. Calculation of the geothermal gradient observed a decrease from 0.47 kelvins per kilometre (0.47 °C/km; 1.4 °F/mi) at the uppermost lower mantle to 0.24 kelvins per kilometre (0.24 °C/km; 0.70 °F/mi) at 2,600 kilometres (1,600 mi).

== Composition ==
The lower mantle is mainly composed of three components, bridgmanite, ferropericlase, and calcium-silicate perovskite (CaSiO_{3}-perovskite). The proportion of each component has been a subject of discussion historically where the bulk composition is suggested to be,

- Pyrolitic: derived from petrological composition trends from upper mantle peridotite suggesting homogeneity between the upper and lower mantle with a Mg/Si ratio of 1.27. This model implies that the lower mantle is composed of 75% bridgmanite, 17% ferropericlase, and 8% CaSiO_{3}-perovskite by volume.
- Chondritic: suggests that the Earth's lower mantle was accreted from the composition of chondritic meteorite suggesting a Mg/Si ratio of approximately 1. This infers that bridgmanite and CaSiO_{3}-perovskites are major components.

Laboratory multi-anvil compression experiments of pyrolite simulated conditions of the adiabatic geotherm and measured the density using in situ X-ray diffraction. It was shown that the density profile along the geotherm is in agreement with the PREM model. The first principle calculation of the density and velocity profile across the lower mantle geotherm of varying bridgmanite and ferropericlase proportion observed a match to the PREM model at an 8:2 proportion. This proportion is consistent with the pyrolitic bulk composition at the lower mantle. Furthermore, shear wave velocity calculations of pyrolitic lower mantle compositions considering minor elements resulted in a match with the PREM shear velocity profile within 1%. On the other hand, Brillouin spectroscopic studies at relevant pressures and temperatures revealed that a lower mantle composed of greater than 93% bridgmanite phase has corresponding shear-wave velocities to measured seismic velocities. The suggested composition is consistent with a chondritic lower mantle. Thus, the bulk composition of the lower mantle is currently a subject of discussion.

== Spin transition zone ==
The electronic environment of two iron-bearing minerals in the lower mantle (bridgmanite, ferropericlase) transitions from a high-spin (HS) to a low-spin (LS) state. Fe^{2+} in ferropericlase undergoes the transition between 50–90 GPa. Bridgmanite contains both Fe^{3+} and Fe^{2+} in the structure, the Fe^{2+} occupy the A-site and transition to a LS state at 120 GPa. While Fe^{3+} occupies both A- and B-sites, the B-site Fe^{3+} undergoes HS to LS transition at 30–70 GPa while the A-site Fe^{3+} exchanges with the B-site Al^{3+} cation and becomes LS. This spin transition of the iron cation results in the increase in partition coefficient between ferropericlase and bridgmanite to 10–14 depleting bridgmanite and enriching ferropericlase of Fe^{2+}. The HS to LS transition are reported to affect the physical properties of the iron bearing minerals. For example, the density and incompressibility was reported to increase from HS to LS state in ferropericlase. The effects of the spin transition on the transport properties and rheology of the lower mantle is currently being investigated and discussed using numerical simulations.

== History ==
Mesosphere (not to be confused with mesosphere, a layer of the atmosphere) is derived from "mesospheric shell", coined by Reginald Aldworth Daly, a Harvard University geology professor. In the pre-plate tectonics era, Daly (1940) inferred that the outer Earth consisted of three spherical layers: lithosphere (including the crust), asthenosphere, and mesospheric shell. Daly's hypothetical depths to the lithosphere-asthenosphere boundary ranged from 80 to 100 km (50 to 62 mi), and the top of the mesospheric shell (base of the asthenosphere) were from 200 to 480 km (124 to 298 mi). Thus, Daly's asthenosphere was inferred to be 120 to 400 km (75 to 249 mi) thick. According to Daly, the base of the solid Earth mesosphere could extend to the base of the mantle (and, thus, to the top of the core).

A derivative term, mesoplates, was introduced as a heuristic, based on a combination of "mesosphere" and "plate", for postulated reference frames in which mantle hotspots exist.

== See also ==
- Large low-shear-velocity provinces
