= Wadsleyite =

Mineral thought to be abundant in the Earth's mantle

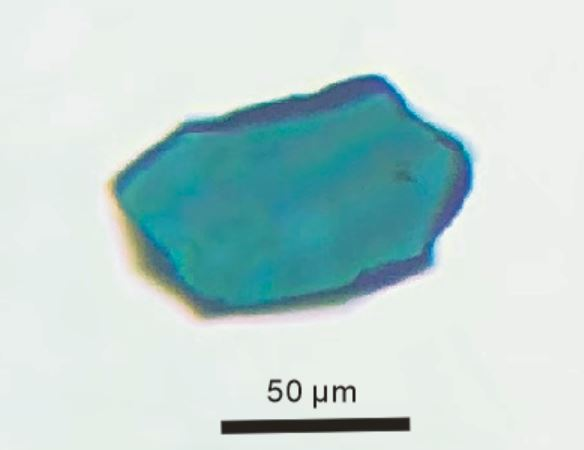
- Crystal

General
- Category: Sorosilicate
- Formula: Mg_{2}SiO_{4}
- IMA symbol: Wds
- Strunz classification: 9.BE.02
- Crystal system: Orthorhombic (Horiuchi and Sawamoto, 1981)
- Crystal class: Dipyramidal (mmm); H-M symbol: (2/m 2/m 2/m)
- Space group: Imma
- Unit cell: a = 5.7 Å, b = 11.71 Å c = 8.24 Å; Z = 8

Identification
- Color: Dark green
- Crystal habit: Microcrystalline aggregates
- Diaphaneity: Transparent
- Specific gravity: 3.84 calculated
- Optical properties: Biaxial
- Refractive index: n = 1.76

Wadsleyite is an orthorhombic mineral with the formula β-(Mg,Fe)_{2}SiO_{4}. It was first found in nature in the Peace River meteorite from Alberta, Canada. It is formed by a phase transformation from olivine (α-(Mg,Fe)_{2}SiO_{4}) under increasing pressure and eventually transforms into spinel-structured ringwoodite (γ-(Mg,Fe)_{2}SiO_{4}) as pressure increases further. The structure can take up a limited amount of other bivalent cations instead of magnesium, but contrary to the α and γ structures, a β structure with the sum formula Fe_{2}SiO_{4} is not thermodynamically stable. Its cell parameters are approximately a = 5.7 Å, b = 11.71 Å and c = 8.24 Å.

Wadsleyite is found to be stable in the upper part of the Transition Zone of the Earth's mantle between 410–520 kilometres (250–320 mi) in depth. Because of oxygen atoms not bound to silicon in the Si_{2}O_{7} groups of wadsleyite, it leaves some oxygen atoms insufficiently bonded. Thus, these oxygens are hydrated easily, allowing for high concentrations of hydrogen atoms in the mineral. Hydrous wadsleyite is considered a potential site for water storage in the Earth's mantle due to the low electrostatic potential of the under bonded oxygen atoms. Although wadsleyite does not contain H in its chemical formula, it may contain more than 3 percent by weight H_{2}O, and may coexist with a hydrous melt at transition zone pressure-temperature conditions. The solubility of water and the density of wadsleyite depend on the temperature and pressure in the Earth. Even though their maximum water storage capabilities might be reduced to about 0.5–1 wt% along the normal geotherm, the transition zone which holds up to 60 vol% wadsleyite could still be a major water reservoir in the Earth's interior. Furthermore, the transformation resulting in wadsleyite is thought to occur also in the shock event when a meteorite impacts the Earth or another planet at very high velocity.

Wadsleyite was first identified by Ringwood and Major in 1966 and was confirmed to be a stable phase by Akimoto and Sato in 1968. The phase was originally known as β-Mg_{2}SiO_{4} or "beta-phase". Wadsleyite was named for mineralogist Arthur David Wadsley (1918–1969).

== Composition ==
In values of weight percent oxide, the pure magnesian variety of wadsleyite would be 42.7% SiO_{2} and 57.3% MgO by mass. An analysis of trace elements within wadsleyite shows a large number of elements: rubidium (Rb), strontium (Sr), barium (Ba), titanium (Ti), zirconium (Zr), niobium (Nb), hafnium (Hf), tantalum (Ta), thorium (Th), and uranium (U). This suggests that the concentrations of these elements could be larger than what has been supposed in the transition zone of Earth's upper mantle. Moreover, these results help in understanding chemical differentiation and magmatism inside the Earth.

Although nominally anhydrous, wadsleyite can incorporate more than 3 percent by weight H_{2}O, which means that it is capable of incorporating more water than Earth's oceans and may be a significant reservoir for H (or water) in the Earth's interior.

== Geologic occurrence ==
Wadsleyite was found in the Peace River meteorite, an L6 hypersthene-olivine chondrite from Peace River, Alberta, Canada. The wadsleyite in this meteorite is believed to have formed at high pressure during the shock event related to the impact on Earth from the olivine in sulfide-rich veins of the meteorite. It occurs as microcrystalline rock fragments, often not surpassing 0.5 mm (0.020 in) in diameter.

== Structure ==
Wadsleyite is a spinelloid, and the structure is based on a distorted cubic-closest packing of oxygen atoms as are the spinels. The a-axis and the b-axis is the half diagonal of the spinel unit. The magnesium and the silicon are completely ordered in the structure. There are three distinct octahedral sites, M1, M2, and M3, and a single tetrahedral site. Wadsleyite is a sorosilicate in which Si_{2}O_{7} groups are present. There are four distinct oxygen atoms in the structure. O2 is a bridging oxygen shared between two tetrahedra, and O1 is a non-silicate oxygen (not bonded to Si). The potentially hydrated O1 atom lies at the center of four edge-sharing Mg^{2+} octahedra. If this oxygen is hydrated (protonated), a Mg vacancy can occur at M3. If water incorporation exceeds about 1.5% the M3 vacancies can be ordered in violation of space group Imma, reducing the symmetry to monoclinic I2/m with beta angle up to 90.4º.

Wadsleyite II is a separate spinelloid phase with both a single (SiO_{4}) and double (Si_{2}O_{7}) tetrahedral units. It is a magnesium-iron silicate with variable composition that might occur between the stability regions of wadsleyite and ringwoodite γ-Mg_{2}SiO_{4}, but computational models suggest that at least the pure magnesian form is not stable. One-fifth of the silicon atom is in isolated tetrahedral and four-fifths is in Si_{2}O_{7} groups so that the structure can be thought of as a mixture of one-fifth spinel and four-fifths wadsleyite.

== Crystallography and physical properties ==
Molar volume vs. pressure at room temperature

Wadsleyite crystallizes in the orthorhombic crystal system and has a unit cell volume of 550.00 Å^{3}. Its space group is Imma and its cell parameters are a = 5.6921 Å, b = 11.46 Å and c = 8.253 Å; an independent study found the cell parameters to be a = 5.698 Å, b = 11.438 Å and c = 8.257 Å. Pure magnesian wadsleyite is colorless, but iron-bearing varieties are dark green.

The wadsleyite minerals generally have a microcrystalline texture and are fractured. Because of small crystal size, detailed optical data could not be obtained; however, wadsleyite is anisotropic with low first-order birefringence colors. It is biaxial with a mean refractive index of n = 1.76 and has a calculated specific gravity of 3.84. In X-ray powder diffraction, its strongest points in pattern are: 2.886(50)(040), 2.691(40)(013), 2.452(100,141), 2.038(80)(240), 1.442(80)(244).

== Sound velocities ==
Sawamoto et al. (1984) firstly measured the P-wave velocity (Vp) and S-wave velocity (Vs) of Mg-endmember of wadsleyite at ambient condition by the Brillouin spectroscopy. Their data suggested that olivine-wadsleyite phase transition would cause a Vp jump of ~13% and a Vs jump of ~14%. Therefore, the olivine-wadsleyite phase transition has been suggested as the main reason for the 410 km seismic discontinuity at the boundary between the Upper Mantle and the Mantle Transition Zone in Earth.

== Namesake ==
Arthur David Wadsley (1918–1969) received the privilege of getting a mineral named after him due to his contributions to geology such as the crystallography of minerals and other inorganic compounds. The proposal to have wadsleyite named after Wadsley was approved by the Commission on New Minerals and Mineral Names of the International Mineralogical Association. The type specimen is now preserved in the collection of the Department of Geology at the University of Alberta.

== See also ==
- Glossary of meteoritics
