= Transition zone (Earth) =

Part of the Earth's mantle

The transition zone is the part of Earth's mantle that is located between the lower and the upper mantle, most strictly between the seismic-discontinuity depths of about 410 to 660 kilometres (250 to 410 mi), but more broadly defined as the zone encompassing those discontinuities, i.e., between about 300 and 850 kilometres (190 and 530 mi) depth. Earth's solid, rocky mantle, including the mantle transition zone (often abbreviated as MTZ), consists primarily of peridotite, an ultramafic igneous rock.

The mantle was divided into the upper mantle, transition zone, and lower mantle as a result of sudden seismic-velocity discontinuities at depths of 410 and 660 kilometres (250 and 410 mi). This is thought to occur as a result of rearrangement of grains in olivine (which constitutes a large portion of peridotite) at a depth of 410 kilometres (250 mi), to form a denser crystal structure as a result of the increase in pressure with increasing depth. Below a depth of 660 kilometres (410 mi), evidence suggests due to pressure changes ringwoodite minerals change into two new denser phases, bridgmanite and periclase. This can be seen using body waves from earthquakes, which are converted, reflected or refracted at the boundary, and predicted from mineral physics, as the phase changes are temperature and density-dependent and hence depth dependent.

== 410 km discontinuity – phase transition ==
A peak is seen in seismological data at about 410 kilometres (250 mi) as is predicted by the transition from α- to β-Mg_{2}SiO_{4} (olivine to wadsleyite). From the Clapeyron slope, this change is predicted to occur at shallower depths in cold regions, such as where subducting slabs penetrate into the transition zone, and at greater depths in warmer regions, such as where mantle plumes pass through the transition zone. Therefore, the exact depth of the "410 km discontinuity" can vary.

== 660 km discontinuity – phase transition ==
The 660 km discontinuity appears in PP precursors (a wave which reflects off the discontinuity once) only in certain regions but is always apparent in SS precursors. It is seen as single and double reflections in receiver functions for P to S conversions over a broad range of depths (640–720 kilometres or 400–450 miles). The Clapeyron slope predicts a deeper discontinuity in cold regions and a shallower discontinuity in hot regions. This discontinuity is generally linked to the transition from ringwoodite to bridgmanite and periclase. This is thermodynamically an endothermic reaction and creates a viscosity jump. Both characteristics cause this phase transition to play an important role in geodynamical models. Cold downwelling material might pond on this transition.

== Other discontinuities ==
There is another major phase transition predicted at 520 kilometres (320 mi) for the transition of olivine (β to γ) and garnet in the pyrolite mantle. This one has only sporadically been observed in seismological data.

Other non-global phase transitions have been suggested at a range of depths.
