= Ferropericlase =

Magnesium or iron oxide that mainly constitutes the lower mantle of the Earth

Ferropericlase or magnesiowüstite is a magnesium/iron oxide with the chemical formula (Mg,Fe)O that is interpreted to be one of the main constituents of the Earth's lower mantle together with the silicate perovskite ((Mg,Fe)SiO_{3}), a magnesium/iron silicate with a perovskite structure. Ferropericlase has been found as inclusions in a few natural diamonds. An unusually high iron content in one suite of diamonds has been associated with an origin from the lowermost mantle. Discrete ultralow-velocity zones in the deepest parts of the mantle, near the Earth's core, are thought to be blobs of ferropericlase, as seismic waves are significantly slowed as they pass through them, and ferropericlase is known to have this effect at the high pressures and temperatures found deep within the Earth's mantle. In May 2018, ferropericlase was shown to be anisotropic in specific ways in the high pressures of the lower mantle. These anisotropies may help seismologists and geologists to confirm whether those ultra-low velocity zones are indeed ferropericlase by observing the exact amount of change in the velocity of seismic waves passing through them in different directions.

== Spin transition zone ==
Changes in the spin state of electrons in iron in mantle minerals has been studied experimentally in ferropericlase. Samples are subject to the conditions of the lower mantle in a laser-heated diamond anvil cell and the spin-state is measured using synchrotron X-ray spectroscopy. Results indicate that the change from a high to low spin state in iron occurs with increasing depth over a range from 1000 km to 2200 km.

== Mantle abundance ==
Ferropericlase (Mg,Fe)O makes up about 20% of the volume of the lower mantle of the Earth, which makes it the second most abundant mineral phase in that region after silicate perovskite (Mg,Fe)SiO_{3}; it also is the major host for iron in the lower mantle. At the bottom of the transition zone of the mantle, the reaction

γ–(Mg,Fe)_{2}[SiO_{4}] ↔ (Mg,Fe)[SiO_{3}] + (Mg,Fe)O

transforms γ-olivine into a mixture of perovskite and ferropericlase and vice versa. In the literature, this mineral phase of the lower mantle is also often called magnesiowüstite.

== See also ==
- Ilmenite
- Post-perovskite
- Wollastonite (CaSiO_{3})
