= Majorite =

Garnet mineral

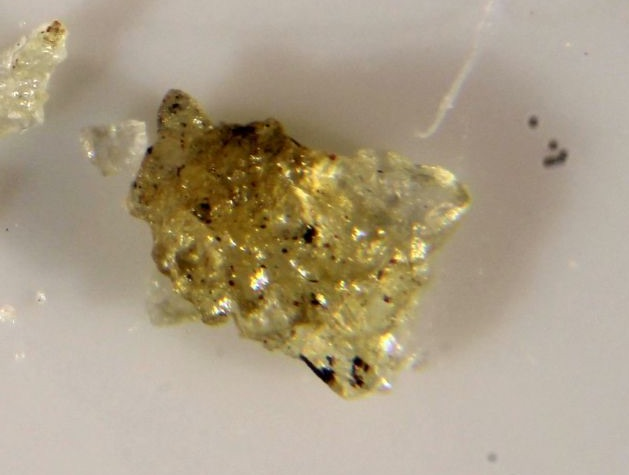

General
- Category: Nesosilicates
- Formula: Mg_{3}(MgSi)(SiO_{4})_{3}
- IMA symbol: Maj
- Strunz classification: 9.AD.25
- Crystal system: Cubic
- Crystal class: Hexoctahedral (m3̅m); H-M symbol: (4/m 3̅ 2/m)
- Space group: Ia3̅d or tetragonal I4_{1}/a for pure MgSiO_{3}
- Unit cell: a = 11.52 Å; Z = 8

Identification
- Color: Purple, pale yellowish brown, colorless
- Crystal habit: Microcrystalline aggregates; acicular to equant grains in narrow veinlets
- Cleavage: None
- Mohs scale hardness: 7–7.5
- Luster: Vitreous
- Diaphaneity: Semitransparent
- Specific gravity: Measured at about 4; 3.51 (calculated for pure MgSiO_{3})
- Optical properties: Isotropic
- Refractive index: n = 1.87 – 1.92 (calculated)
- Birefringence: slight

Majorite is a mineral found in the mantle of the Earth. Its chemical formula is Mg_{3}(MgSi)(SiO_{4})_{3}. It is a type of garnet, distinguished from other garnets in having silicon in octahedral as well as tetrahedral coordination. Majorite was first described in 1970 from the Coorara Meteorite of Western Australia and has been reported from various other meteorites in which majorite is thought to result from an extraterrestrial high pressure shock event. Mantle-derived xenoliths containing majorite have been reported from potassic ultramafic magmas on Malaita Island on the Ontong Java Plateau in the southwest Pacific Ocean.

== Synthetic magnesium endmember majorite ==
Pure synthetic magnesium majorite (MgSiO_{3}) is polymorphous with enstatite, and akimotoite. Majorite is a member of the garnet group. It has Mg in eight-coordination with oxygen; it also has both Mg and Si in octahedral (6) coordination; and Si in tetrahedral (4) coordination with oxygen. Unlike most garnets, which are cubic, pure MgSiO_{3} majorite is tetragonal.

== In the mantle ==
Majorite is believed to be an abundant mineral in the lower transition zone and uppermost lower mantle of the Earth at depths of 550–900 km (340–560 mi). It forms complex solid solutions with other Al, Fe, and Ca-bearing garnets in this region.

All of the minerals of the Earth's mantle are made of oxygen as the principal anion. It has been reported that a significant property of majorite is that under conditions of high pressure and temperature as exist in the mantle the mineral tends to absorb and store oxygen. However, when the temperature and pressure decrease as would occur when the majorite is drawn up toward the surface of the Earth by convection currents the mineral breaks down and releases the oxygen. Research has suggested that the total amount of oxygen stored in majorite in the mantle is likely quite large and may in fact contribute to keeping the Earth's surface moist and habitable.

== See also ==
- Glossary of meteoritics
