= Silicate perovskite =

One of the main minerals in the Earth's lower mantle

General
- Category: Minerals
- Formula: (Mg,Fe)SiO_{3}
- IMA symbol: Bdm
- IMA status: Approved
- Strunz classification: 9.H0.
- Crystal system: Orthorhombic
- Crystal class: Dipyramidal

Identification

Silicate perovskite is either (Mg,Fe)SiO_{3} (the magnesium end-member is called bridgmanite) or CaSiO_{3} (calcium silicate, known as davemaoite) when arranged in a perovskite structure. Silicate perovskites are not stable at Earth's surface, and mainly exist in the lower part of Earth's mantle, between about 670 and 2,700 km (420 and 1,680 mi) depth. They are thought to form the main mineral phases of the lower mantle, together with ferropericlase.

== Discovery ==
The existence of silicate perovskite in the mantle was first suggested in 1962, and both MgSiO_{3} and CaSiO_{3} had been synthesized experimentally before 1975. By the late 1970s, it had been proposed that the seismic discontinuity at about 660 km in the mantle represented a change from spinel structure minerals with an olivine composition to silicate perovskite with ferropericlase.

Natural silicate perovskite was discovered in the heavily shocked Tenham meteorite. In 2014, the Commission on New Minerals, Nomenclature and Classification (CNMNC) of the International Mineralogical Association (IMA) approved the name bridgmanite for perovskite-structured (Mg,Fe)SiO_{3}, in honor of physicist Percy Bridgman, who was awarded the Nobel Prize in Physics in 1946 for his high-pressure research.

In 2021 perovskite-structured CaSiO_{3} was found as an inclusion in a natural diamond. The name davemaoite has been adopted for this mineral.

== Structure ==
The perovskite structure (first identified in the mineral perovskite) occurs in substances with the general formula ABX_{3}, where A is a metal that forms large cations, typically magnesium, ferrous iron, or calcium. B is another metal that forms smaller cations, typically silicon, although minor amounts of ferric iron and aluminum can occur. X is typically oxygen. The structure may be cubic, but only if the relative sizes of the ions meet strict criteria. Typically, substances with the perovskite structure show lower symmetry, owing to the distortion of the crystal lattice and silicate perovskites are in the orthorhombic crystal system.

== Occurrence ==
=== Stability range ===
Bridgmanite is a high-pressure polymorph of enstatite, but in the Earth predominantly forms, along with ferropericlase, from the decomposition of ringwoodite (a high-pressure form of olivine) at approximately 660 km depth, or a pressure of about 24 GPa. The depth of this transition depends on the mantle temperature; it occurs slightly deeper in colder regions of the mantle and shallower in warmer regions. The transition from ringwoodite to bridgmanite and ferropericlase marks the bottom of the mantle transition zone and the top of the lower mantle. Bridgmanite becomes unstable at a depth of approximately 2700 km, transforming isochemically to post-perovskite.

Calcium silicate perovskite is stable at slightly shallower depths than bridgmanite, becoming stable at approximately 500 km, and remains stable throughout the lower mantle.

=== Abundance ===
Bridgmanite is the most abundant mineral in the mantle. The proportions of bridgmanite and calcium perovskite depends on the overall lithology and bulk composition. In pyrolitic and harzburgitic lithologies, bridgmanite constitutes around 80% of the mineral assemblage, and calcium perovskite less than 10%. In an eclogitic lithology, bridgmanite and calcium perovskite comprise about 30% each. Magnesium silicate perovskite is probably the most abundant mineral phase in the Earth.

=== Presence in diamonds ===
Calcium silicate perovskite has been identified at Earth's surface as inclusions in diamonds. The diamonds are formed under high pressure deep in the mantle. With the great mechanical strength of the diamonds a large part of this pressure is retained inside the lattice, enabling inclusions such as the calcium silicate to be preserved in high-pressure form.

== Deformation ==
Experimental deformation of polycrystalline MgSiO_{3} under the conditions of the uppermost part of the lower mantle suggests that silicate perovskite deforms by a dislocation creep mechanism. This may help explain the observed seismic anisotropy in the mantle.

== See also ==
- Ringwoodite
- Perovskite nanocrystal
