= Ringwoodite =

High-pressure phase of magnesium silicate

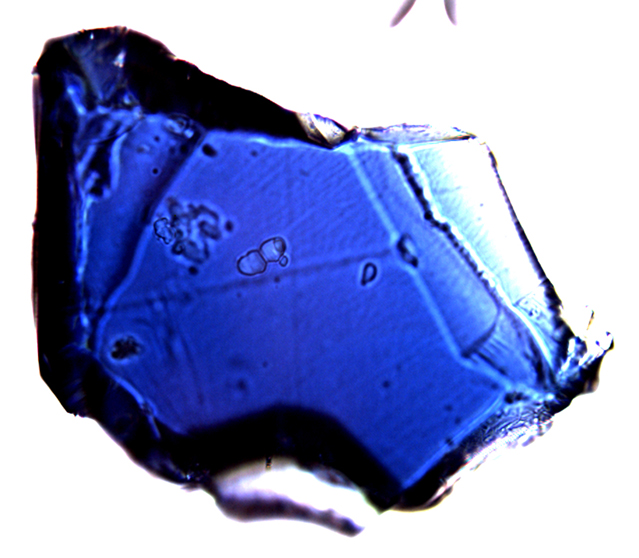
- Crystal (~150 micrometers across) of Fo90 composition blue ringwoodite synthesized at 20 GPa and 1200 °C.

General
- Category: Nesosilicates; Spinel group
- Formula: Magnesium silicate (Mg_{2}SiO_{4})
- IMA symbol: Rgd
- Strunz classification: 9.AC.15
- Crystal system: Cubic
- Crystal class: Hexoctahedral (m3̅m); H-M symbol: (4/m 3̅ 2/m)
- Space group: Fd3̅m
- Unit cell: a = 8.113 Å; Z = 8

Identification
- Colour: Deep blue, also red, violet, or colourless (pure Mg_{2}SiO_{4})
- Crystal habit: Microcrystalline aggregates
- Diaphaneity: Semitransparent
- Specific gravity: 3.90 (Mg_{2}SiO_{4}); 4.13 ((Mg_{0.91},Fe_{0.09})_{2}SiO_{4}); 4.85 (Fe_{2}SiO_{4})
- Optical properties: Isotropic
- Refractive index: n = 1.8
- Birefringence: none
- Pleochroism: none

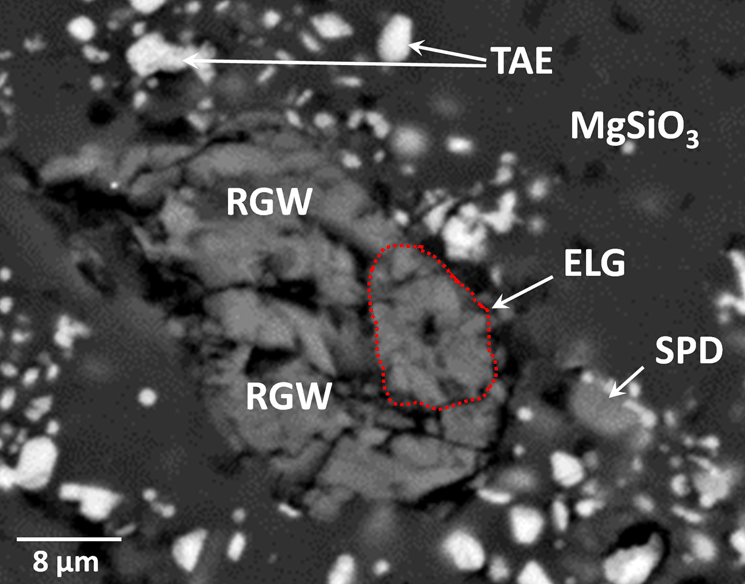
SEM image of Ringwoodite (RGW) discovered in the Suizhou L6 chondrite meteorite

Ringwoodite is a high-pressure phase of Mg_{2}SiO_{4} (magnesium silicate) formed at high temperatures and pressures of the Earth's mantle between 525 and 660 km (326 and 410 mi) depth. It may also contain iron and hydrogen. It is polymorphous with the olivine phase forsterite (a magnesium iron silicate).

Ringwoodite is notable for being able to contain hydroxide ions within its structure. In this case two hydroxide ions usually take the place of a magnesium ion and two oxide ions.

Combined with evidence of its occurrence deep in the Earth's mantle, this suggests that there is from one to three times the world ocean's equivalent of water in the mantle transition zone from 410 to 660 km deep.

This mineral was first identified in the Tenham meteorite in 1969, and is inferred to be present in large quantities in the Earth's mantle.

Olivine, wadsleyite, and ringwoodite are polymorphs found in the upper mantle of the earth. At depths greater than about 660 kilometres (410 mi), other minerals, including some with the perovskite structure, are stable. The properties of these minerals determine many of the properties of the mantle.

Ringwoodite was named after the Australian earth scientist Ted Ringwood (1930–1993), who studied polymorphic phase transitions in the common mantle minerals olivine and pyroxene at pressures equivalent to depths as great as about 600 km.

== Characteristics ==
Ringwoodite is polymorphous with forsterite, Mg_{2}SiO_{4}, and has a spinel structure. Spinel group minerals crystallize in the isometric system with an octahedral habit. Olivine is most abundant in the upper mantle, above about 410 km (250 mi); the olivine polymorphs wadsleyite and ringwoodite are thought to dominate the transition zone of the mantle, a zone present from about 410 to 660 km depth.

Ringwoodite is thought to be the most abundant mineral phase in the lower part of Earth's transition zone. The physical and chemical property of this mineral partly determine properties of the mantle at those depths. The pressure range for stability of ringwoodite lies in the approximate range from 18 to 23 GPa.

Natural ringwoodite has been found in many shocked chondritic meteorites, in which the ringwoodite occurs as fine-grained polycrystalline aggregates.

Natural ringwoodite generally contains much more magnesium than iron and can form a gapless solid solution series from the pure magnesium endmember to the pure iron endmember. The latter, the iron-rich endmember of the γ-olivine solid solution series, γ-Fe_{2}SiO_{4}, was named ahrensite in honor of US mineral physicist Thomas J. Ahrens (1936–2010).

== Geological occurrences ==
In meteorites, ringwoodite occurs in the veinlets of quenched shock-melt cutting the matrix and replacing olivine probably produced during shock metamorphism.

In Earth's interior, olivine occurs in the upper mantle at depths less than about 410 km, and ringwoodite is inferred to be present within the transition zone from about 520 to 660 km depth. Seismic activity discontinuities at about 410 km, 520 km, and at 660 km depth have been attributed to phase changes involving olivine and its polymorphs.

The 520-km depth discontinuity is generally believed to be caused by the transition of the olivine polymorph wadsleyite (beta-phase) to ringwoodite (gamma-phase), while the 660-km depth discontinuity by the phase transformation of ringwoodite (gamma-phase) to a silicate perovskite plus magnesiowüstite.

Ringwoodite in the lower half of the transition zone is inferred to play a pivotal role in mantle dynamics, and the plastic properties of ringwoodite are thought to be critical in determining flow of material in this part of the mantle. The ability of ringwoodite to incorporate hydroxide is important because of its effect on rheology.

Ringwoodite has been synthesized at conditions appropriate to the transition zone, containing up to 2.6 weight percent water.

Because the transition zone between the Earth's upper and lower mantle helps govern the scale of mass and heat transport throughout the Earth, the presence of water within this region, whether global or localized, may have a significant effect on mantle rheology and therefore mantle circulation. In subduction zones, the ringwoodite stability field hosts high levels of seismicity.

An "ultradeep" diamond (one that has risen from a great depth) found in Juína in western Brazil contained an inclusion of ringwoodite — at the time the only known sample of natural terrestrial origin — thus providing evidence of significant amounts of water as hydroxide in the Earth's mantle. The gemstone, about 5mm long, was brought up by a diatreme eruption. The ringwoodite inclusion is too small to see with the naked eye. A second such diamond was later found.

The mantle reservoir could contain about three times more water, in the form of hydroxide contained within the wadsleyite and ringwoodite crystal structure, than the Earth's oceans combined.

== Synthetic ==
For experiments, hydrous ringwoodite has been synthesized by mixing powders of forsterite (Mg_{2}SiO_{4}), brucite (Mg(OH)_{2}), and silica (SiO_{2}) so as to give the desired final elemental composition. Putting this under 20 gigapascals of pressure at 1,523 K (1,250 °C; 2,282 °F) for three or four hours turns this into ringwoodite, which can then be cooled and depressurized.

== Crystal structure ==
Ringwoodite has the spinel structure, in the isometric crystal system with space group Fd3̅m (or F4̅3m). On an atomic scale, magnesium and silicon are in octahedral and tetrahedral coordination with oxygen, respectively. The Si-O and Mg-O bonds have mixed ionic and covalent character. The cubic unit cell parameter is 8.063 Å for pure Mg_{2}SiO_{4} and 8.234 Å for pure Fe_{2}SiO_{4}.

== Chemical composition ==
Ringwoodite compositions range from pure Mg_{2}SiO_{4} to Fe_{2}SiO_{4} in synthesis experiments. Ringwoodite can incorporate up to 2.6 percent by weight H_{2}O.

== Physical properties ==
Molar volume vs. pressure at room temperature for ringwoodite γ-Mg_{2}SiO_{4}

Molar volume vs. pressure at room temperature for ahrensite γ-Fe_{2}SiO_{4}

The physical properties of ringwoodite are affected by pressure and temperature. At the pressure and temperature condition of the Mantle Transition Zone, the calculated density value of ringwoodite is 3.90 g/cm^{3} for pure Mg_{2}SiO_{4}; 4.13 g/cm^{3} for (Mg_{0.91},Fe_{0.09})_{2}SiO_{4} of pyrolitic mantle; and 4.85 g/cm^{3} for Fe_{2}SiO_{4}. It is an isotropic mineral with an index of refraction n = 1.768.

The colour of ringwoodite varies between the meteorites, between different ringwoodite bearing aggregates, and even in one single aggregate. The ringwoodite aggregates can show every shade of blue, purple, grey and green, or have no colour at all.

A closer look at coloured aggregates shows that the colour is not homogeneous, but seems to originate from something with a size similar to the ringwoodite crystallites. In synthetic samples, pure Mg ringwoodite is colourless, whereas samples containing more than one mole percent Fe_{2}SiO_{4} are deep blue in colour. The colour is thought to be due to Fe^{2+}–Fe^{3+} charge transfer.
