= Water on Earth =

Water on Earth may refer to:

- Origin of water on Earth
- Water distribution on Earth
