= Ted Ringwood =

Australian geophysicist/chemist (1930–1993)

Alfred Edward "Ted" Ringwood
- Born: 19 April 1930; Kew, Melbourne, Australia
- Died: 12 November 1993 (aged 63)
- Education: Melbourne University
- Awards: William Bowie Medal (1974); Mueller Medal (1975); Wollaston Medal (1988); V. M. Goldschmidt Award (1991); Clarke Medal (1992)
- Scientific career
- Fields: Geochemistry, petrology, planetology
- Workplaces: Australian National University
- Thesis: Studies in geochemistry (1956)
- Academic advisors: Arthur Gaskin, Francis Birch

Alfred Edward "Ted" Ringwood FRS FAA (19 April 1930 – 12 November 1993) was an Australian experimental geophysicist and geochemist, and the 1988 recipient of the Wollaston Medal.

The mineral ringwoodite is named after him.

== Early life and study ==
Ringwood was born in Kew, only child of Alfred Edward Ringwood. He attended Hawthorn West State School where he played cricket and Australian Rules football. In 1943 he was successful in gaining a scholarship to Geelong Grammar School where he boarded. On matriculation, he enrolled in Geology a science degree at the University of Melbourne where he held a Commonwealth Government Scholarship, and was awarded a resident scholarship at Trinity College. He represented the college and the university in football. He obtained First Class Honours degree in Geology and began a MSc degree in field-mapping and petrology of the Devonian Snowy River volcanics of northeastern Victoria, graduating with Honours in 1953. Ringwood then undertook a PhD, beginning an experimental study about the origin of metalliferous ore deposits, but later changed his research topic so as to apply geochemistry to an understanding of the structure of the Earth, in particular the mineralogical constitution of the Earth's mantle.

== Germanate and Earth's mantle ==
In the late 1950s and 1960s Ringwood worked on germanates. He discovered that they served as low-pressure analogue to high-pressure silicates. With this insight he was able to predict that the phase changes of the mantle minerals olivine and pyroxene should occur in the Transition Zone. At the Australian National University he began experimental study of silicates at high pressure, and in 1959 demonstrated that the iron end-member of olivine indeed transformed to the denser spinel structure, as did numerous germanate and germanate-silicate solid solutions. In 1966, Ringwood and Alan Major, the technical officer who worked with him from 1964 to 1993, synthesised the spinel form of (Mg,Fe)_{2}SiO_{4}, Also in 1966, the transformation of pure forsterite (Mg_{2}SiO_{4}) to spinel-like phase was achieved.

In 1969 a new mineral was discovered in fragments of the Tenham meteorite which had the same crystal structure as the high pressure spinel polymorph of olivine. This was the first time that Ringwood's predicted polymorph was found in nature. Honouring the importance of Ringwood's work the mineral was named ringwoodite. A team from the University of Alberta have isolated terrestrial ringwoodite in a brown diamond specimen found in Brazil in 2008. Their research suggests the presence of water deep within the Earth's mantle.

== Later life ==
In 1978, his ANU team invented synroc, a possible means of safely storing and disposing of radioactive waste.

Ringwood died of lymphoma on 12 November 1993 at the age of 63.

== Honours ==
Ringwood received numerous honours and awards for his work.

- 1972 Werner medal
- 1974 Arthur L. Day Medal
- 1974 William Bowie Medal
- 1975 Mueller Medal
- 1978 Matthew Flinders Medal and Lecture
- 1985 Arthur Holmes Medal
- 1988 Wollaston Medal
- 1991 Feltrinelli Prize
- 1991 V. M. Goldschmidt Award
- 1992 Clarke Medal
- 1993 Jaeger Medal
- 1993 Harry H. Hess Medal

Fellowships

- 1966 Fellow of the Australian Academy of Science (FAA)
- 1969 Fellow, American Geophysical Union
- 1972 Fellow of the Royal Society of London (FRS)
- 1972 Fellow, Meteoritical Society
- 1983 Honorary Foreign Fellow, European Union of Geosciences

The European Association of Geochemistry quinquennially awards a Science Innovation Award medal named in his honour for work in petrology and mineral physics.

== Legacy ==
The Geological Society of Australia introduced the A. E. Ringwood Medal, for "internationally recognised contributions to fundamental Earth science through petrology and geochemistry."

== Selected publications ==
- Ringwood, A. E. (1979). Origin of the earth and moon. New York: Springer-Verlag. ISBN 978-0387903699.
- Ringwood, A. E. (1976). Composition and petrology of the earth's mantle. New York: McGraw-Hill. ISBN 9780070529328.

Awards
Preceded by Shirley Winifred Jeffrey	Clarke Medal; 1992	Succeeded by Gordon C. Grigg
