= Tenham (meteorite) =

Chondritic meteorite that fell in 1879 in a remote area of Queensland, Australia

Coordinates: 25°44′0″S 142°57′0″E

Tenham meteorite
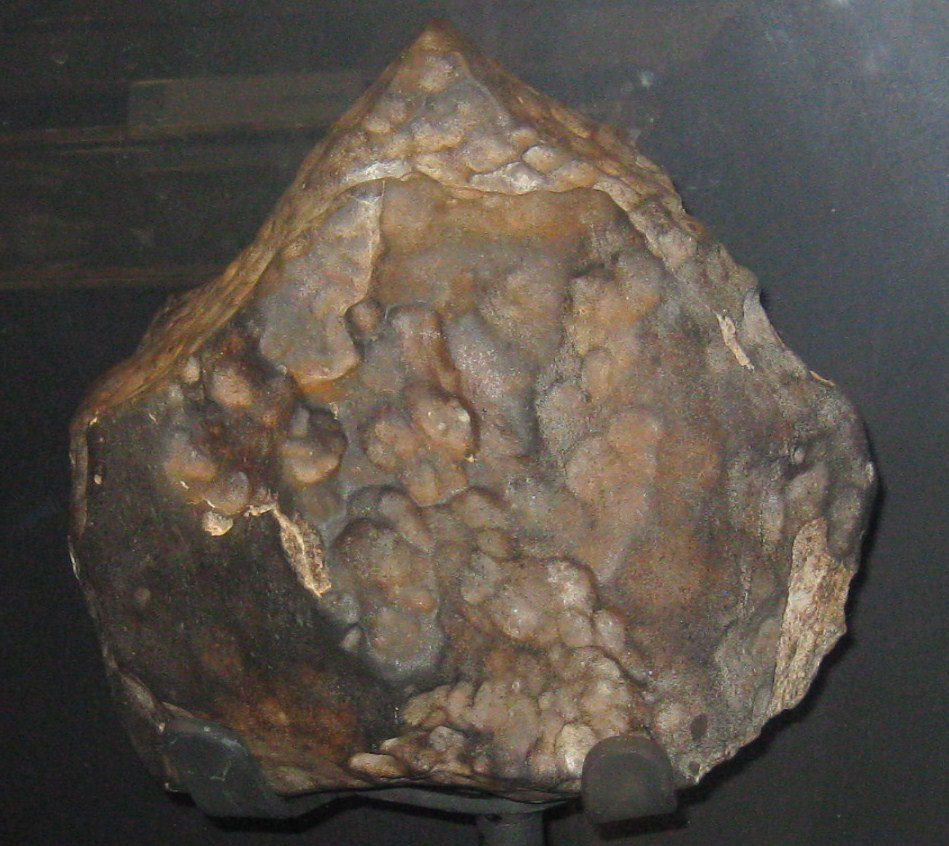
- Fragment on display in the Natural History Museum, London
- Type: Chondrite
- Class: Ordinary chondrite (L6)
- Country: Australia
- Region: Tenham station, South Gregory, western Queensland
- Fall date: 1879
- Related media on Wikimedia Commons

Tenham meteorites are the fragments of a larger meteorite that fell in 1879 in a remote area of Australia near the Tenham station, South Gregory, in western Queensland. Although the fall was seen by a number of people, its exact date has not been established. Bright meteors were seen to be moving roughly from west to east. Stones were subsequently recovered from over a large area, about 20 kilometres (12 mi) long by 5 kilometres (3.1 mi) wide.

Because the Tenham meteorites were recovered quite soon after they fell, from a remote and dry region in which weathering and other alterations had not set in, they have been invaluable for scientific study of meteorites and their mineral contents. They are examples of chondritic meteorites, containing a high level of organic compounds, and rich in silicates, oxides, and sulfides. Many scientific studies have explored the mineralogy of these meteorites and their non-terrestrial features.

Because the Tenham meteorites show evidence of high pressure deformations, they have been used to infer chemical and mineral changes that might occur within Earth's mantle.

Ringwoodite, the high pressure forsterite polymorph named after Ted Ringwood, was discovered in fragments of the Tenham meteorite.

In 2014, a team of scientists at Argonne National Laboratory studied a sample of bridgmanite, a silicate perovskite ((Mg,Fe)SiO_{3}), taken from the Tenham meteorite. The team used micro-focused X-rays for diffraction analysis and fast-readout area-detector techniques to avoid damage to the sample. The study yielded results not seen when using synthetic samples, including a higher than expected presence of sodium and ferric iron.

== See also ==
- Glossary of meteoritics
