= Water distribution on Earth =

A graphical distribution of the locations of water on Earth

Visualisation of the distribution (by volume) of water on Earth. Each tiny cube (such as the one representing biological water) corresponds to approximately 1,000 km^{3} of water, with a mass of about 1 trillion tonnes (200,000 times that of the Great Pyramid of Giza or five times that of Lake Kariba, arguably the heaviest man-made object). Comprising 1 million tiny cubes, the entire cube would measure about 1,102 km on each side.

Most water in Earth's atmosphere and crust comes from saline seawater, while fresh water accounts for nearly 2.5% of the total. The vast bulk of the water on Earth is saline or salt water, with an average salinity of 35‰ (or 3.5%, roughly equivalent to 34 grams of salts in 1 kg of seawater), though this varies slightly according to the amount of runoff received from surrounding land. In all, water from oceans and marginal seas, saline groundwater and water from saline closed lakes amount to over 97% of the water on Earth, though no closed lake stores a globally significant amount of water. Saline groundwater is seldom considered except when evaluating water quality in arid regions.

The remainder of Earth's water constitutes the planet's freshwater resource. Typically, fresh water is defined as water with a salinity of less than 1% that of the oceans – i.e. below around 0.35‰. Water with a salinity between this level and 1‰ is typically referred to as marginal water because it is marginal for many uses by humans and animals. The ratio of salt water to fresh water on Earth is around 50:1.

The planet's fresh water is also very unevenly distributed. Although in warm periods such as the Mesozoic and Paleogene when there were no glaciers anywhere on the planet and all fresh water was found in rivers and streams, today most fresh water exists in the form of ice, snow, groundwater and soil moisture, with only 0.3% in liquid form on the surface. Of the liquid surface fresh water, 87% is contained in lakes, 11% in swamps, and only 2% in rivers. Small quantities of water also exist in the atmosphere and in living beings.

Although the total volume of groundwater is known to be much greater than that of river runoff, a large proportion of this groundwater is saline and should therefore be classified with the saline water above. There is also a lot of fossil groundwater in arid regions that have never been renewed for thousands of years; this must not be seen as renewable water.

== Distribution of saline and fresh water ==
The total volume of water on Earth is estimated at 1.386 billion km^{3} (333 million cubic miles), with 97.5% being salt water and 2.5% being freshwater. Of the freshwater, only 0.3% is in liquid form on the surface.

Because the oceans that cover roughly 70.8% of the area of Earth reflect blue light, Earth appears blue from space, and is often referred to as the blue planet and the Pale Blue Dot. Liquid freshwater like lakes and rivers cover about 1% of Earth's surface and altogether with Earth's ice cover, Earth's surface is 75% water by area.

Source of water	Volume of water in km^{3} (cu mi)	% total water	% salt water	% fresh water	% liquid surface fresh water
Oceans	1,338,000,000 (321,000,000)	96.5	99.0		
Pacific Ocean	669,880,000 (160,710,000)	48.3	49.6		
Atlantic Ocean	310,410,900 (74,471,500)	22.4	23.0		
Indian Ocean	264,000,000 (63,000,000)	19.0	19.5		
Southern Ocean	71,800,000 (17,200,000)	5.18	5.31		
Arctic Ocean	18,750,000 (4,500,000)	1.35	1.39		
Ice and snow	24,364,000 (5,845,000)	1.76		69.6	
Glaciers	24,064,000 (5,773,000)	1.74		68.7	
Antarctic ice sheet	21,600,000 (5,200,000)	1.56		61.7	
Greenland ice sheet	2,340,000 (560,000)	0.17		6.68	
Arctic islands	83,500 (20,000)	0.006		0.24	
Mountain ranges	40,600 (9,700)	0.003		0.12	
Ground ice and permafrost	300,000 (72,000)	0.022		0.86	
Groundwater	23,400,000 (5,600,000)	1.69			
Saline groundwater	12,870,000 (3,090,000)	0.93	0.95		
Fresh groundwater	10,530,000 (2,530,000)	0.76		30.1	
Soil moisture	16,500 (4,000)	0.0012		0.047	
Lakes	176,400 (42,300)	0.013			
Saline lakes	85,400 (20,500)	0.0062	0.0063		
Caspian Sea	78,200 (18,800)	0.0056	0.0058		
Other saline lakes	7,200 (1,700)	0.00052	0.00053		
Fresh water lakes	91,000 (22,000)	0.0066		0.26	87.0
African Great Lakes	30,070 (7,210)	0.0022		0.086	28.8
Lake Baikal	23,615 (5,666)	0.0017		0.067	22.6
North American Great Lakes	22,115 (5,306)	0.0016		0.063	21.1
Other fresh water lakes	15,200 (3,600)	0.0011		0.043	14.5
Atmosphere	12,900 (3,100)	0.00093		0.037	
Swamps	11,470 (2,750)	0.00083		0.033	11.0
Rivers	2,120 (510)	0.00015		0.0061	2.03
Biological water	1,120 (270)	0.000081		0.0032	

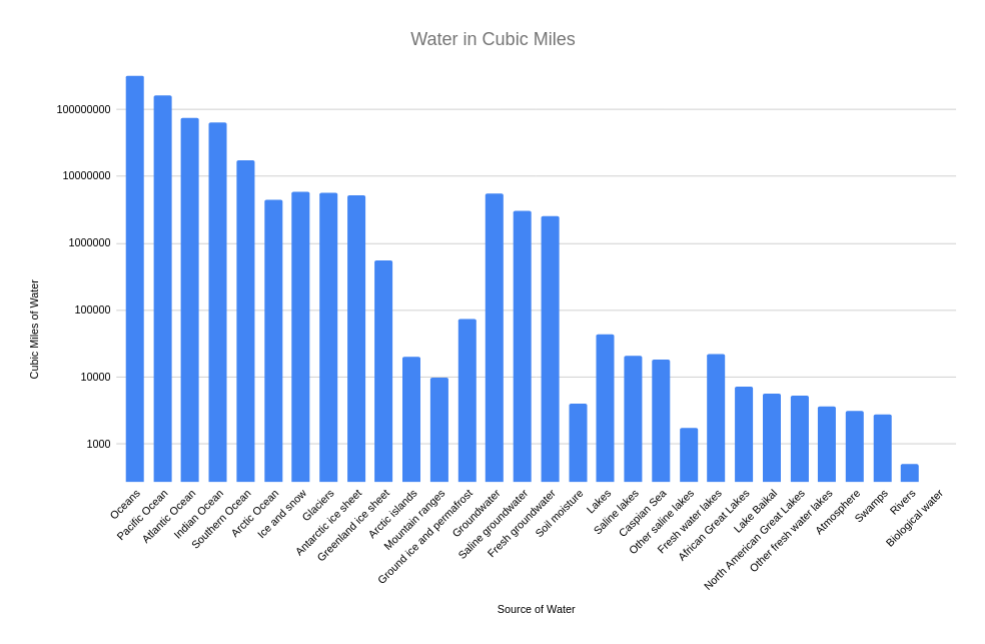
Logarithm graph of source of water in cubic miles

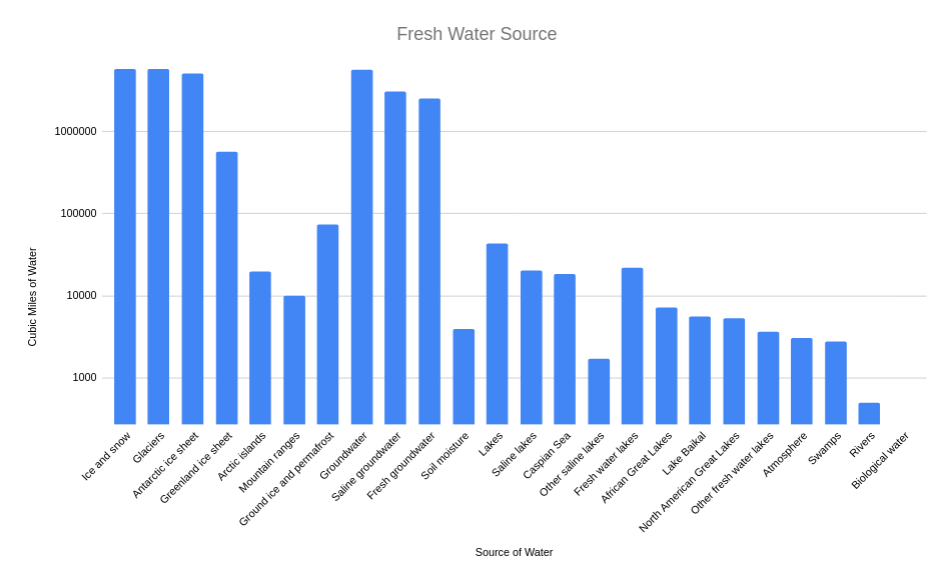
Logarithm graph of fresh water's source (including saline lakes and saline groundwater)

=== Lakes ===
Collectively, Earth's lakes hold 199,000 km^{3} of water. Most lakes are in the high northern latitudes, far from human population centers. The North American Great Lakes, which contain 21% of the world's fresh water by volume, are an exception. The Great Lakes Basin is home to more than 35 million people. The Canadian cities of Thunder Bay, St. Catharines, Hamilton, Toronto, Oshawa, and Kingston, as well as the U.S. cities of Detroit, Duluth, Milwaukee, Chicago, Gary, Cleveland, Buffalo, and Rochester are all located on shores of the Great Lakes System.

=== Groundwater ===
Fresh groundwater is of great value, especially in arid countries such as China. Its distribution is broadly similar to that of surface river water, but it is easier to store in hot and dry climates because groundwater storage are much more shielded from evaporation than are dams. In countries such as Yemen, groundwater from erratic rainfall during the rainy season is the major source of irrigation water.

Because groundwater recharge is much more difficult to accurately measure than surface runoff, groundwater is not generally used in areas where even fairly limited levels of surface water are available. Even today, estimates of total groundwater recharge vary greatly for the same region depending on what source is used, and cases where fossil groundwater is exploited beyond the recharge rate (including the Ogallala Aquifer) are very frequent and almost always not seriously considered when they were first developed.

== Distribution of river water ==
The total volume of water in rivers is estimated at 2,120 km^{3} (510 mi^{3}), or 0.49% of the surface fresh water on Earth. Rivers and basins are often compared not according to their static volume, but to their flow of water, or surface run off. The distribution of river runoff across the Earth's surface is very uneven.

Continent or region	River runoff (km^{3}/year)	Percent of world total
Asia (excluding Middle East)	13,300	30.6
South America	12,000	27.6
North America	7,800	17.9
Oceania	6,500	14.9
Sub-Saharan Africa	4,000	9.2
Europe	2,900	6.7
Australia	440	1.0
Middle East and North Africa	140	0.3

There can be huge variations within these regions. For example, as much as a quarter of Australia's limited renewable fresh water supply is found in almost uninhabited Cape York Peninsula. Also, even in well-watered continents, there are areas that are extremely short of water, such as Texas in North America, whose renewable water supply totals only 26 km^{3}/year in an area of 695,622 km^{2}, or South Africa, with only 44 km^{3}/year in 1,221,037 km^{2}. The areas of greatest concentration of renewable water are:

- The Amazon and Orinoco Basins (a total of 6,500 km^{3}/year or 15 percent of global runoff)
- East Asia
  - Yangtze Basin – 1,000 km^{3}/year
- South and Southeast Asia, with a total of 8,000 km^{3}/year or 18 percent of global runoff
  - Ganges Basin – 900 km^{3}/year
  - Irrawaddy Basin – 500 km^{3}/year
  - Mekong Basin – 450 km^{3}/year
- Canada, with over 10 percent of world's river water and large numbers in lakes
  - Mackenzie River – over 250 km^{3}/year
  - Yukon River – over 150 km^{3}/year
- Siberia
  - Yenisey – over 5% of world's fresh water in basin – second largest after the Amazon
  - Ob River – over 500 km^{3}/year
  - Lena River – over 450 km^{3}/year
- New Guinea
  - Fly and Sepik Rivers – total over 300 km^{3}/year in only about 150,000 km^{2} of basin area.

== Area, volume, and depth of oceans ==
Body of Water	Area (10^{6} km^{2})	Volume (10^{6} km^{3})	Mean Depth (m)
Pacific Ocean	165.2	707.6	4,282
Atlantic Ocean	82.4	323.6	3,926
Indian Ocean	73.4	291.0	3,963
All oceans and seas	361	1,370	3,796

The oceanic crust is young, thin and dense because oceanic crust is continuously created at mid-ocean ridges and recycled into the mantle at subduction zones with none of the rocks within it dating from any older than the breakup of Pangaea and is less than about 200 million years old. Because water is much denser than any gas, this means that water will flow into the "depressions" formed as a result of the high density of oceanic crust (on a planet like Venus, with no water, the depressions appear to form a vast plain above which rise plateaux). Since the low density rocks of the continental crust contain large quantities of easily eroded salts of the alkali and alkaline earth metals, salt has, over billions of years, accumulated in the oceans as a result of evaporation returning the fresh water to land as rain and snow.

== Variability of water availability ==
Variability of water availability is important both for the functioning of aquatic species and also for the availability of water for human use: water that is only available in a few wet years must not be considered renewable. Because most global runoff comes from areas of very low climatic variability, the total global runoff is generally of low variability.

Indeed, even in most arid zones, there tends to be few problems with variability of runoff because most usable sources of water come from high mountain regions which provide highly reliable glacier melt as the chief source of water, which also comes in the summer peak period of high demand for water. This historically aided the development of many of the great civilizations of ancient history, and even today allows for agriculture in such productive areas as the San Joaquin Valley.

However, in Australia and Southern Africa, the story is different. Here, runoff variability is much higher than in other continental regions of the world with similar climates. Typically temperate (Köppen climate classification C) and arid (Köppen climate classification B) climate rivers in Australia and Southern Africa have as much as three times the coefficient of variation of runoff of those in other continental regions. The reason for this is that, whereas all other continents have had their soils largely shaped by Quaternary glaciation and mountain building, soils of Australia and Southern Africa have been largely unaltered since at least the early Cretaceous and generally since the previous ice age in the Carboniferous. Consequently, available nutrient levels in Australian and Southern African soils tend to be orders of magnitude lower than those of similar climates in other continents, and native flora compensate for this through much higher rooting densities (e.g. proteoid roots) to absorb minimal phosphorus and other nutrients. Because these roots absorb so much water, runoff in typical Australian and Southern African rivers does not occur until about 300 mm (12 in) or more of rainfall has occurred. In other continents, runoff will occur after quite light rainfall due to the low rooting densities.

Climate type (Köppen)	Mean annual rainfall	Typical runoff ratio for Australia and Southern Africa	Typical runoff ratio for rest of the world
BWh	250 mm (10 in)	1 percent (2.5 mm)	10 percent (25 mm)
BSh (on Mediterranean fringe)	350 mm (14 in)	3 percent (12 mm)	20 percent (80 mm)
Csa	500 mm (20 in)	5 percent (25 mm)	35 percent (175 mm)
Caf	900 mm (35 in)	15 percent (150 mm)	45 percent (400 mm)
Cb	1,100 mm (43 in)	25 percent (275 mm)	70 percent (770 mm)

The consequence of this is that many rivers in Australia and Southern Africa (as compared to extremely few in other continents) are theoretically impossible to regulate because rates of evaporation from dams mean a storage sufficiently large to theoretically regulate the river to a given level would actually allow very little draft to be used. Examples of such rivers include those in the Lake Eyre Basin. Even for other Australian rivers, a storage three times as large is needed to provide a third the supply of a comparable climate in southeastern North America or southern China. It also affects aquatic life, favouring strongly those species able to reproduce rapidly after high floods so that some will survive the next drought.

Tropical (Köppen climate classification A) climate rivers in Australia and Southern Africa do not, in contrast, have markedly lower runoff ratios than those of similar climates in other regions of the world. Although soils in tropical Australia and southern Africa are even poorer than those of the arid and temperate parts of these continents, vegetation can use organic phosphorus or phosphate dissolved in rainwater as a source of the nutrient. In cooler and drier climates these two related sources tend to be virtually useless, which is why such specialized means are needed to extract the most minimal phosphorus.

There are other isolated areas of high runoff variability, though these are basically due to erratic rainfall rather than different hydrology. These include:

- Southwest Asia
- The Brazilian Nordeste
- The Great Plains of the United States

== Possible water reservoirs inside Earth ==
It has been hypothesized that the water is present in the Earth's crust, mantle and even the core and interacts with the surface ocean through the "whole-Earth water cycle". However, the actual amount of water stored in the Earth's interior still remains under debate. An estimated 1.5 to 11 times the amount of water in the oceans may be found hundreds of kilometers deep within the Earth's interior, although not in liquid form.

=== Water in Earth's mantle ===
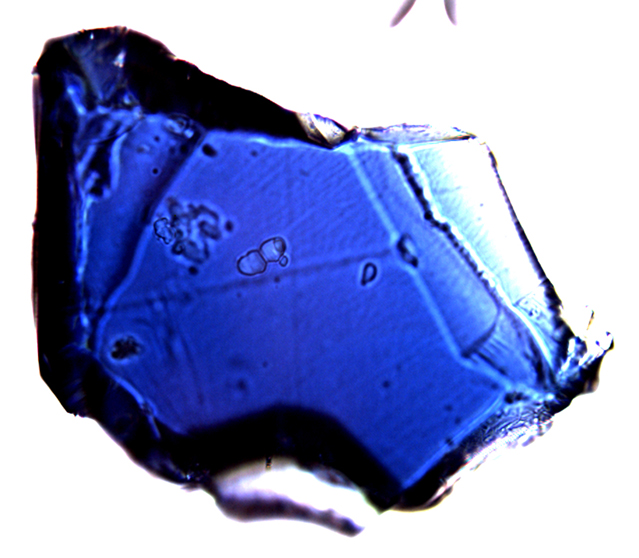
Ringwoodite is the major phase at the Earth's mantle between ~520 and ~660 km depth, possibly containing several weight percent of water in its crystal structure.

The lower mantle of inner earth may hold as much as 5 times more water than all surface water combined (all oceans, all lakes, all rivers).

The amount of water stored in the Earth's interior may equal or exceed that in all of the surface oceans. Some researchers proposed the total mantle water budget may amount to tens of ocean masses. The water in the Earth's mantle is primarily dissolved in nominally anhydrous minerals as hydroxyls (OH). These OH impurities in rocks and minerals can lubricate tectonic plate, influence rock viscosity and melting processes, and slow down seismic waves. The two mantle phases at the transition zone between Earth's upper and lower mantle, wadsleyite and ringwoodite, could potentially incorporate up to a few weight percent of water into their crystal structure. Direct evidence of the presence of water in the Earth's mantle was found in 2014 based on a hydrous ringwoodite sample included in a diamond from Juína, Brazil. Seismic observations suggest the presence of water in dehydration melt at the top of the lower mantle under the continental US. Molecular water (H_{2}O) is not the primary water-bearing phase(s) in the mantle, but its high-pressure form, ice-VII, also has been found in super-deep diamonds.

== See also ==
- Deficit irrigation
- Magmatic water
- Origin of water on Earth
- Water cycle
- Water resources
