= Seismic anisotropy =

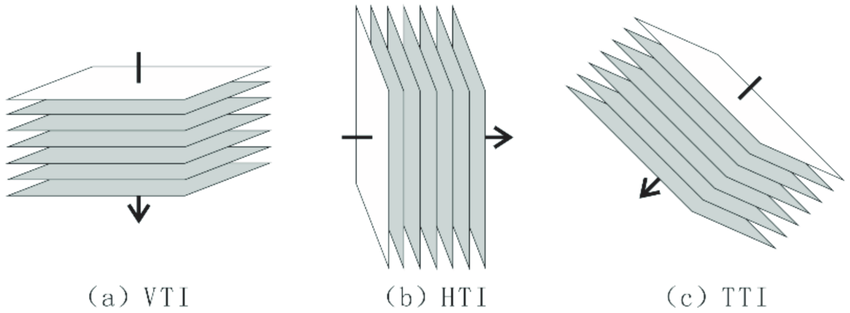
Types of anisotropic media with transversely isotropic layers, classified based on the orientation of the symmetry axis perpendicular to the layers: a) vertical transverse isotropy (VTI), b) horizontal transverse isotropy (HTI), and c) tilted transverse isotropy (TTI).

Seismic anisotropy is the directional dependence of the velocity of seismic waves in a medium (rock) within the Earth.

== Description ==
A material is said to be anisotropic if the value of one or more of its properties varies with direction. Anisotropy differs from the property called heterogeneity in that anisotropy is the variation in values with direction at a point while heterogeneity is the variation in values between two or more points.

Seismic anisotropy can be defined as the dependence of seismic velocity on direction or upon angle. General anisotropy is described by a 4th order elasticity tensor with 21 independent elements. However, in practice observational studies are unable to distinguish all 21 elements, and anisotropy is usually simplified. In the simplest form, there are two main types of anisotropy, both of them are called transverse isotropy (it is called transverse isotropy because there is isotropy in either the horizontal or vertical plane) or polar anisotropy. The difference between them is in their axis of symmetry, which is an axis of rotational invariance such that if we rotate the formation about the axis, the material is still indistinguishable from what it was before. The symmetry axis is usually associated with regional stress or gravity.

- Vertical transverse isotropy (VTI), transverse isotropy with a vertical axis of symmetry, is associated with layering and shale and is found where gravity is the dominant factor.
- Horizontal transverse isotropy (HTI), transverse isotropy with a horizontal axis of symmetry, is associated with cracks and fractures and is found where regional stress is the dominant factor.

The transverse anisotropic matrix has the same form as the isotropic matrix, except that it has five non-zero values distributed among 12 non-zero elements.

Transverse isotropy is sometimes called transverse anisotropy or anisotropy with hexagonal symmetry. In many cases the axis of symmetry will be neither horizontal nor vertical, in which case it is often called "tilted".

== History of the recognition of anisotropy ==
Anisotropy was first recognised in the 19th century following the theory of Elastic wave propagation. George Green (1838) and Lord Kelvin (1856) took anisotropy into account in their articles on wave propagation. Anisotropy entered seismology in the late 19th century and was introduced by Maurycy Rudzki. From 1898 till his death in 1916, Rudzki attempted to advance the theory of anisotropy, he attempted to determine the wavefront of a transversely isotropic medium (TI) in 1898 and in 1912 and 1913 he wrote on surface waves in transversely isotropic half space and on Fermat's principle in anisotropic media respectively.

With all these, the advancement of anisotropy was still slow and in the first 30 years (1920–1950) of exploration seismology only a few papers were written on the subject. More work was done by several scientists such as Helbig (1956) who observed while doing seismic work on Devonian schists that velocities along the foliation were about 20% higher than those across the foliation. However the appreciation of anisotropy increased with the proposition of a new model for the generation of anisotropy in an originally isotropic background and a new exploration concept by Crampin (1987). One of the main points by Crampin was that the polarization of three component shear waves carries unique information about the internal structure of the rock through which they pass, and that shear wave splitting may contain information about the distribution of crack orientations.

With these new developments and the acquisition of better and new types of data such as three component 3D seismic data, which clearly show the effects of shear wave splitting, and wide azimuth 3D data which show the effects of azimuthal anisotropy, and the availability of more powerful computers, anisotropy began to have great impact in exploration seismology in the past three decades.

== Concept of seismic anisotropy ==
Since the understanding of seismic anisotropy is closely tied to the shear wave splitting, this section begins with a discussion of shear wave splitting.

Shear waves have been observed to split into two or more fixed polarizations which can propagate in the particular ray direction when entering an anisotropic medium. These split phases propagate with different polarizations and velocities. Crampin (1984) amongst others gives evidence that many rocks are anisotropic for shear wave propagation. In addition, shear wave splitting is almost routinely observed in three-component VSPs. Such shear wave splitting can be directly analyzed only on three component geophones recording either in the subsurface, or within the effective shear window at the free surface if there are no near surface low-velocity layers. Observation of these shear waves show that measuring the orientation and polarization of the first arrival and the delay between these split shear waves reveal the orientation of cracks and the crack density . This is particularly important in reservoir characterization.

In a linearly elastic material, which can be described by Hooke's law as one in which each component of stress is dependent on every component of strain, the following relationship exists:

$$\sigma_{ij} = C_{ijkl} e_{kl} \quad i,j,k,l = 1,2,3$$

where σ is the stress, C is the elastic moduli or stiffness constant, and e is the strain.

The elastic modulus matrix for an anisotropic case is

$$\underline{\underline{\mathsf{C}}} =
\begin{bmatrix}
C_{11} & C_{11} - 2C_{66} & C_{13} & 0 & 0 & 0 \\
C_{11} - 2C_{66} & C_{11} & C_{13} & 0 & 0 & 0 \\
C_{13} & C_{13} & C_{33} & 0 & 0 & 0 \\
0 & 0 & 0 & C_{44} & 0 & 0 \\
0 & 0 & 0 & 0 & C_{44} & 0\\
0 & 0 & 0 & 0 & 0 & C_{66} \end{bmatrix}$$

The above is the elastic modulus for a vertical transverse isotropic medium (VTI), which is the usual case. The elastic modulus for a horizontal transverse isotropic medium (HTI) is:

$$\underline{\underline{\mathsf{C}}} =
\begin{bmatrix}
C_{11} & C_{13} & C_{13} & 0 & 0 & 0 \\
C_{13} & C_{33} & C_{33} - 2C_{44} & 0 & 0 & 0 \\
C_{13} & C_{33} - 2C_{44} & C_{33} & 0 & 0 & 0 \\
0 & 0 & 0 & C_{44} & 0 & 0 \\
0 & 0 & 0 & 0 & C_{66} & 0\\
0 & 0 & 0 & 0 & 0 & C_{66} \end{bmatrix}$$

For an anisotropic medium, the directional dependence of the three phase velocities can be written by applying the elastic moduli in the wave equation is; The direction dependent wave speeds for elastic waves through the material can be found by using the Christoffel equation and are given by

$$\begin{align}
V_{p}(\theta)    &= \sqrt{\frac{C_{11} \sin^2(\theta) + C_{33}
\cos^2(\theta)+C_{55}+\sqrt{M(\theta)}}{2\rho}} \\
V_{SV}(\theta) &= \sqrt{\frac{C_{11} \sin^2(\theta) + C_{33}
\cos^2(\theta)+C_{55}-\sqrt{M(\theta)}}{2\rho}} \\
V_{SH}(\theta) &= \sqrt{\frac{C_{66} \sin^2(\theta) +
C_{55}\cos^2(\theta)}{\rho}} \\
M(\theta)      &= \left[\left(C_{11}-C_{55}\right) \sin^2(\theta) - \left(C_{33}-C_{55}\right)\cos^2(\theta)\right]^2
+ \left(C_{13} + C_{55}\right)^2 \sin^2(2\theta) \\
\end{align}$$
where
$$\begin{align}\theta\end{align}$$
is the angle between the axis of symmetry and the wave propagation direction, $\rho$ is mass density and the $C_{ij}$ are elements of the elastic stiffness matrix. The Thomsen parameters are used to simplify these expressions and make them easier to understand.

Seismic anisotropy has been observed to be weak, and Thomsen (1986) rewrote the velocities above in terms of their deviation from the vertical velocities as follows;

$$\begin{align}
V_{P}(\theta) & \approx V_{P0}(1 + \delta \sin^2 \theta \cos^2 \theta + \epsilon \sin^4 \theta) \\
V_{SV}(\theta) & \approx V_{S0}\left[1 + \left(\frac{V_{P0}}{ V_{S0}}\right)^2(\epsilon-\delta) \sin^2 \theta \cos^2 \theta\right] \\
V_{SH}(\theta) & \approx V_{S0}(1 + \gamma \sin^2 \theta )
\end{align}$$
where

$$V_{P0}= \sqrt{C_{33}/\rho} ~;~~ V_{S0}= \sqrt{C_{44}/\rho}$$

are the P and S wave velocities in the direction of the axis of symmetry ($\mathbf{e}_3$) (in geophysics, this is usually, but not always, the vertical direction). Note that $\delta$ may be further linearized, but this does not lead to further simplification.

The approximate expressions for the wave velocities are simple enough to be physically interpreted, and sufficiently accurate for most geophysical applications. These expressions are also useful in some contexts where the anisotropy is not weak.

The Thomsen parameters are anisotropic and are three non-dimensional combinations which reduce to zero in isotropic cases, and are defined as

$$\begin{align}
\epsilon & = \frac{C_{11} - C_{33}}{ 2C_{33} } \\
\delta & = \frac{(C_{13} + C_{44})^2-(C_{33} - C_{44})^2}{ 2C_{33}(C_{33} - C_{44}) } \\
\gamma & = \frac{C_{66} - C_{44}}{ 2C_{44} }
\end{align}$$

== Origin of anisotropy ==
Anisotropy has been reported to occur in the Earth's three main layers: the crust, mantle and the core.

The origin of seismic anisotropy is non-unique, a range of phenomena may cause Earth materials to display seismic anisotropy. The anisotropy may be strongly dependent on wavelength if it is due to the average properties of aligned or partially aligned heterogeneity. A solid has intrinsic anisotropy when it is homogeneously and sinuously anisotropic down to the smallest particle size, which may be due to crystalline anisotropy. Relevant crystallographic anisotropy can be found in the upper mantle. When an otherwise isotropic rock contains a distribution of dry or liquid-filled cracks which have preferred orientation it is named crack induced anisotropy. The presence of aligned cracks, open or filled with some different material, is an important mechanism at shallow depth, in the crust. It is well known that the small-scale, or microstructural, factors include (e.g. Kern & Wenk 1985; Mainprice et al. 2003): (1) crystal lattice preferred orientation (LPO) of constituent mineral phases; (2) variations in spatial distribution of grains and minerals; (3) grain morphology and (4) aligned fractures, cracks and pores, and the nature of their infilling material (e.g. clays, hydrocarbons, water, etc.). Because of the overall microstructural control on seismic anisotropy, it follows that anisotropy can be diagnostic for specific rock types. Here, we consider whether seismic anisotropy can be used as an indicator of specific sedimentary lithologies within the Earth's crust.

In sedimentary rocks, anisotropy develops during and after deposition. For anisotropy to develop, there needs to be some degree of homogeneity or uniformity from point to point in the deposited clastics. During deposition, anisotropy is caused by the periodic layering associated with changes in sediment type which produces materials of different grain size, and also by the directionality of the transporting medium which tends to order the grains under gravity by grain sorting. Fracturing and some diagenetic processes such as compaction and dewatering of clays, and alteration etc. are post depositional processes that can cause anisotropy.

== The importance of anisotropy in hydrocarbon exploration and production ==
In the past two decades, the seismic anisotropy has dramatically been gaining attention from academic and industry, due to advances in anisotropy parameter estimation, the transition from post stack imaging to pre stack depth migration, and the wider offset and azimuthal coverage of 3D surveys. Currently, many seismic processing and inversion methods utilize anisotropic models, thus providing a significant enhancement over the seismic imaging quality and resolution. The integration of anisotropy velocity model with seismic imaging has reduced uncertainty on internal and bounding-fault positions, thus greatly reduce the risk of investment decision based heavily on seismic interpretation.

In addition, the establishment of correlation between anisotropy parameters, fracture orientation, and density, lead to practical reservoir characterization techniques. The acquisition of such information, fracture spatial distribution and density, the drainage area of each producing well can be dramatically increased if taking the fractures into account during the drilling decision process. The increased drainage area per well will result in fewer wells, greatly reducing the drilling cost of exploration and production (E&P) projects.

== The application of the anisotropy in petroleum exploration and production ==
Among several applications of seismic anisotropy, the following are the most important: anisotropic parameter estimation, prestack depth anisotropy migration, and fracture characterization based on anisotropy velocity models.

=== Anisotropy parameter estimation ===
The anisotropy parameter is most fundamental to all other anisotropy application in E&P area. In the early days of seismic petroleum exploration, the geophysicists were already aware of the anisotropy-induced distortion in P-wave imaging (the major of petroleum exploration seismic surveys). Although the anisotropy-induced distortion is less significant since the poststack processing of narrow-azimuth data is not sensitive to velocity. The advancement of seismic anisotropy is largely contributed by the Thomsen's work on anisotropy notation and also by the discovery of the P-wave time-process parameter $\eta$ . These fundamental works enable to parametrize the transverse isotropic (TI) models with only three parameters, while there are five full independent stiff tensor element in transverse isotropic (VTI or HTI) models. This simplification made the measurement of seismic anisotropy a plausible approach.

Most anisotropy parameter estimation work is based on shale and silts, which may be due to the fact that shale and silts are the most abundant sedimentary rocks in the Earth's crust. Also in the context of petroleum geology, organic shale is the source rock as well as seal rocks that trap oil and gas. In seismic exploration, shales represent the majority of the wave propagation medium overlying the petroleum reservoir. In conclusion, seismic properties of shale are important for both exploration and reservoir management.

Seismic velocity anisotropy in shale can be estimated from several methods, including deviated-well sonic logs, walkway VSP, and core measurement. These methods have their own advantages and disadvantages: the walkway VSP method suffers from scaling issues, and core measure is impractical for shale, since shale is hard to be cored during drilling.

==== Walkway VSP ====
The Walkway VSP array several seismic surface sources at different offset from the well. Meanwhile, a vertical receiver array with constant interval between receivers is mounted in a vertical well. The sound arrival times between multiple surface sources and receivers at multiple depths are recorded during measurement. These arrival times are used to derive the anisotropy parameter based on the following equations

$$t^2 (x)=t_0^2 + \frac{x^2}{V_{nmo}^2 } -\frac{2\eta x^4}{V_{nmo}^2 ([t_0^2 V]_{nmo}^2+(1+2\eta)x^2)}$$

where $t(x)$ is the arrival time from source with $x$ offset, $t_0$ is the arrival time of zero offset, $V_{nmo}$ is NMO velocity, $\eta$ is Thompson anisotropy parameter.

==== Core measurement ====
Another technique used to estimate the anisotropy parameter is directly measure them from the core which is extracted through a special hollow drill bit during drill process. Since coring a sample will generate large extra cost, only limited number of core samples can be obtained for each well. Thus the anisotropy parameter obtained through core measurement technique only represent the anisotropy property of rock near the borehole at just several specific depth, rending this technique often provides little help on the field seismic survey application. The measurements on each shale plug require at least one week.

From the context of this article, wave propagation in a vertically transverse medium can be described with five elastic constants, and ratios among these parameters define the rock anisotropy. This anisotropy parameter can be obtained in the laboratory by measuring the velocity travel speed with transducer ultrasonic systems at variable saturation and pressure conditions. Usually, three directions of wave propagation on core samples are the minimum requirement to estimate the five elastic coefficients of the stiffness tensor. Each direction in core plug measurement yields three velocities (one P and two S).

The variation of wave propagation direction can be achieved by either cutting three samples at 0°, 45° and 90° from the cores or by using one core plug with transducers attached at these three angles. Since most shales are very friable and fissured, it is often difficult to cut shale core plug. Its edges break off easily. Thus the cutting sample method can only be used for hard, competent rocks.

Another way to get the wave propagation velocity at three directions is to arrange the ultrasonic transducer onto several specific location of the core sampler. This method avoids the difficulties encounter during the cutting of shale core sample. It also reduces the time of measurement by two thirds since three pairs of ultrasonic transducer work at the same time.

Once the velocities at three directions are measured by one of the above two methods, the five independent elastic constants are given by the following equations:

$$\begin{align}
&C_{33} = \rho V_{P}^2(0^\circ)\\
&C_{11}=\rho V_{P}^2(90^\circ)\\
&C_{55}=\rho V_{SH}^2(90^\circ)\\
&C_{66}=\rho V_{SV}^2(90^\circ)\\
&C_{13}=\left[\frac{(4\rho V_{P}^2(45^\circ) - C_{11} - C_{33} - 2C_{44} )^2-[(C_{11}-C_{33})]^2}{4}\right]^{1/2} - C_{44}\\
&\epsilon=\frac{C_{11}-C_{33}}{2C_{33} }\\
&\gamma=\frac{C_{66}-C_{44}}{2C_{44} }\\
&\delta=\frac{(C_{13}+C_{44})^2 - (C_{33}-C_{44})^2}{2C_{33} (C_{33}-C_{44})}
\end{align}$$

The P-wave anisotropy of a VTI medium can be described by using Thomsen's parameters $\epsilon, \delta$. The $\epsilon$ quantifies the velocity difference for wave propagation along and perpendicular to the symmetry axis, while $\delta$ controls the P-wave propagation for angles near the symmetry axis.

==== Deviated well sonic log ====
The last technique can be used to measure the seismic anisotropy is related to the sonic logging information of a deviated well. In a deviated well, the wave propagation velocity is higher than the wave propagation velocity in a vertical well at the same depth. This difference in velocity between deviated well and vertical well reflects the anisotropy parameters of the rocks near the borehole. The detail of this technique will be shown on an example of this report.

=== Anisotropic prestack depth migration ===
In the situation of complex geology, e.g. faulting, folding, fracturing, salt bodies, and unconformities, pre-stack migration (PreSM) is used due to better resolution under such complex geology. In PreSM, all traces are migrated before being moved to zero-offset. As a result, much more information is used, which results in a much better image, along with the fact that PreSM honours velocity changes more accurately than post-stack migration. The PreSM is extremely sensitive to the accuracy of the velocity field. Thus the inadequacy of isotropic velocity models is not suitable for the pre stack depth migration. P-wave anisotropic prestack depth migration (APSDM) can produce a seismic image that is very accurate in depth and space. As a result, unlike isotropic PSDM, it is consistent with well data and provides an ideal input for reservoir characterization studies. However, this accuracy can only be achieved if correct anisotropy parameters are used. These parameters cannot be estimated from seismic data alone. They can only be determined with confidence through analysis of a variety of geoscientific material – borehole data and geological history.

During recent years, the industry has started to see the practical use of anisotropy in seismic imaging. We show case studies that illustrate this integration of the geosciences. We show that much better accuracy is being achieved. The logical conclusion is that, this integrated approach should extend the use of anisotropic depth imaging from complex geology only, to routine application on all reservoirs.

=== Fracture characterization ===
After considering applications of anisotropy that improved seismic imaging, two approaches for exploiting anisotropy for the analysis of fractures in the formation are worthy of discussing. Ones uses azimuthal variations in the amplitude versus offset (AVO) signature when the wave is reflected from the top or base of an anisotropic material, and a second exploits the polarizing effect that the fractures have on a transmitted shear-wave. In both cases, the individual fractures are below the resolving power of the seismic signal and it is the cumulative effect of the fracturing that is recorded. Based on the idea behind them, both approaches can be divided into two steps. The first step is to get the anisotropy parameters from seismic signals, and the second steps is to retreat the information of fractures from anisotropy parameters based on the fracture induce anisotropy model.

==== Fractures-azimuthal variations ====
Aligned subseismic-scale fracturing can produce seismic anisotropy (i.e., seismic velocity varies with direction) and leads to measurable directional differences in traveltimes and reflectivity.

If the fractures are vertically aligned, they will produce azimuthal anisotropy (the simplest case being horizontal transverse isotropy, or HTI) such that reflectivity of an interface depends on azimuth as well as offset. If either of the media bounding the interface is azimuthally anisotropic, the AVO will have an azimuthal dependence. The P-P wave reflection coefficient have the following relation with the azimuthal if anisotropy exist in the layers:

$$R_{PP}= A + (b_{11} \cos^2 \phi + 2b_{12} \cos\phi \sin\phi + b_{22} \sin^2 \phi)$$

where $\phi$ is the azimuth from data acquisition grid, the terms $b_{ij}$ are coefficients describing anisotropy parameter.

==== Fractures: shear-wave splitting ====
The behavior of shear waves as they pass through anisotropic media has been recognized for many years, with laboratory and field observations demonstrating how the shear wave splits into two polarized components with their planes aligned parallel and perpendicular to the anisotropy. For a fractured medium, the faster shear wave is generally aligned with the strike direction and the time delay between the split shear waves related to the fracture density and path length traveled. For layered medium, the shear wave polarized parallel to the layering arrives first.

== Examples of the application of anisotropy ==
=== Example of anisotropy in petroleum E&P ===
Two examples will be discussed in there to show the anisotropy application in Petroleum E&P area. The first related to anisotropy parameter estimation via deviated well sonic logging tool. And the second example reflects the image quality improvement by PreStack Depth Migration technology.

=== Example of deviated well sonic logging ===
In this case, the sonic velocity in a deviated well is obtained by dipole sonic logging tool . The formation is mostly composed of shale. In order to use the TI model, several assumptions are made:

- Rock should be in normally pressured regime.
- Rock should have similar burial history.

Satisfying the above conditions, the following equation hold for a TI model:

$$V_{P}(\phi)= V_P(0)(1 + \delta \sin^2\phi \cos^2\phi + \epsilon \sin^4 \phi)$$

Where $\phi$ is the deviated angle of the well, and $\delta$, $\epsilon$ are anisotropy parameter.

The following plot shows typical velocity distribution vs density in a deviated well. The color of each data point represents the frequency of this data point. The red color means a high frequency while the blue color represents a low frequency. The black line shows a typical velocity trend without the effect of anisotropy. Since the existence of anisotropy effect, the sound velocity is higher than the trend line.

From the well logging data, the velocity vs $\phi$ plot can be drawn. On the basis of this plot, a no liner regression will give us an estimate of $\delta$ and $\epsilon$. The following plot show the non-linear regression and its result.

Put the estimated $\delta$ and $\epsilon$ into the following equation, the correct $V_P(0)$ can be obtained.

$$V_P(0) = \frac{V_P(\phi)}{1 + \delta\sin^2\phi\cos^2\phi + \epsilon\sin^4\phi}$$

By doing the above correction calculation, the corrected $V_P(0)$ is plot vs density in the following plot. As be seen in the plot, most of the data point falls on the trend line. It validate the correctness of the estimate of anisotropy parameter.

=== Example of prestack depth migration Imaging ===
In this case, the operator conducted several seismic surveys on a gas field in the north sea over the period of 1993-1998 . The early survey does not take anisotropy into account, while the later survey employs the PreStack Depth Migration imaging. This PSDM was done on a commercial seismic package developed by Total. The following two plots clearly reveal the resolution improvement of the PSDM method. The top plot is a convention 3D survey without anisotropy effect. The bottom plot used PSDM method. As can be seen in the bottom plot, more small structure features are revealed due to the reduce of error and improved resolution.

== Limitations of seismic anisotropy ==
Seismic anisotropy relies on shear waves, shear waves carry rich information which can sometimes impede its utilization. Shear waves survey for anisotropy requires multi component (usually 3 component) geophones which are oriented at angles, these are more expensive than the widely used vertical oriented single component geophones. However, while expensive 3 component seismometers are much more powerful in their ability to collect valuable information about the Earth that vertical component seismometers simply cannot. While seismic waves do attenuate, large earthquakes (moment magnitude > 5) have the ability to produce observable shear waves. The second law of thermodynamics ensures a higher attenuation of shear wave reflected energy, this tends to impede the utilization of shear wave information for smaller earthquakes.

== Crustal anisotropy ==
In the Earth's crust, anisotropy may be caused by preferentially aligned joints or microcracks, by layered bedding in sedimentary formations, or by highly foliated metamorphic rocks. Crustal anisotropy resulting from aligned cracks can be used to determine the state of stress in the crust, since in many cases, cracks are preferentially aligned with their flat faces oriented in the direction of minimum compressive stress. In active tectonic areas, such as near faults and volcanoes, anisotropy can be used to look for changes in preferred orientation of cracks that may indicate a rotation of the stress field.

Both seismic P-waves and S-waves may exhibit anisotropy. For both, the anisotropy may appear as a (continuous) dependence of velocity upon the direction of propagation. For S-waves, it may also appear as a (discrete) dependence of velocity upon the direction of polarization. For a given direction of propagation in any homogeneous medium, only two polarization directions are allowed, with other polarizations decomposing trigonometrically into these two. Hence, shear waves naturally "split" into separate arrivals with these two polarizations; in optics this is called birefringence.

Crustal anisotropy is very important in the production of oil reservoirs, as the seismically fast directions can indicate preferred directions of fluid flow.

In crustal geophysics, the anisotropy is usually weak; this enables a simplification of the expressions for seismic velocities and reflectivities, as functions of propagation (and polarization) direction. In the simplest geophysically plausible case, that of polar anisotropy, the analysis is most conveniently done in terms of Thomsen Parameters.

== Mantle anisotropy ==
In the mantle, anisotropy is normally associated with crystals (mainly olivine) aligned with the mantle flow direction called lattice preferred orientation (LPO). Due to their elongate crystalline structure, olivine crystals tend to align with the flow due to mantle convection or small scale convection. Anisotropy has long been used to argue whether plate tectonics is driven from below by mantle convection or from above by the plates, i.e. slab pull and ridge push.

The favored methods for detecting seismic anisotropy are shear wave splitting, seismic tomography of surface waves and body waves, and converted-wave scattering in the context of a receiver function. In shear-wave splitting, the S wave splits into two orthogonal polarizations, corresponding to the fastest and slowest wavespeeds in that medium for that propagation direction. The period range for mantle splitting studies is typically 5-25-sec. In seismic tomography, one must have a spatial distribution of seismic sources (earthquakes or man-made blasts) to generate waves at multiple wave-propagation azimuths through a 3-D medium. For receiver functions, the P-to-S converted wave displays harmonic variation with earthquake back azimuth when the material at depth is anisotropic. This method allows determination of layers of anisotropic material at depth beneath a station.

In the transition zone, wadsleyite and/or ringwoodite could be aligned in LPO. Below the transition zone, the three main minerals, periclase, silicate perovskite (bridgmanite), and post-perovskite are all anisotropic and could be generating anisotropy observed in the D" region (a couple hundred kilometer thick layer about the core-mantle boundary).

== Sources ==
- Helbig, K., Thomsen, L., 75-plus years of anisotropy in exploration and reservoir seismics: A historical review of concepts and methods: Geophysics. VOL. 70, No. 6 (November–December 2005): p. 9ND–23ND http://www.geo.arizona.edu/geo5xx/geo596f/Readings/Helbig%20and%20Thomsen,%202005,%20historical%20review%20anisotropy%201.pdf
- Crampin, S., 1984, Evaluation of anisotropy by shear wave splitting: Applied Seismic Anisotropy: Theory, Background, and Field Studies, Geophysics Reprint series, 20, 23–33.
- Ikelle, L.T., Amundsen, L., Introduction to Petroleum Seismology, Investigations in Geophysics series No.12.
- Thomsen, L., 1986, Weak elastic anisotropy: Applied Seismic Anisotropy: Theory, Background, and Field Studies, Geophysics Reprint series, 20, 34–46
- Anderson et al., Oilfield Anisotropy: Its Origins and Electrical Characteristics: Oil field review, 48–56. https://www.slb.com/~/media/Files/resources/oilfield_review/ors94/1094/p48_56.pdf
- Thomsen, L., : Geophysics, 51, 1954–1966, Weak elastic anisotropy.
- Tsvankin, I., : Geophysics, 62, 1292–1309.1997, Anisotropic parameters and P-wave velocity for orthorhombic media.
- Tsvankin, I., Seismic signatures and analysis of reflection data in anisotropic media: Elsevier Science Publ, 2001,.
- Stephen A. H. and J-Michael K. GEOPHYSICS, VOL. 68, NO. 4, P1150–1160. Fracture characterization at Valhall: Application of P-wave amplitude variation with offset and azimuth (AVOA) analysis to a 3D ocean-bottom data set
- Tushar P. and Robert V. SPE 146668. Improved Reservoir Characterization through Estimation of Velocity Anisotropy in Shales.
- Jeffrey S., Rob R., Jean A., et al. www.cgg.com/technicalDocuments/cggv_0000000409.pdf Reducing Structural Uncertainties Through Anisotropic Prestack Depth Imaging: Examples from the Elgin/Franklin/Glenelg HP/HT Fields Area, Central North Sea
- Helbig, K., 1984, Shear waves – what they are and how they are and how they can be used: Applied Seismic Anisotropy: Theory, Background, and Field Studies, Geophysics Reprint series, 20, 5–22.
