= Seismic velocity structure =

Seismic wave velocity variation

The velocity structure of the Earth. The red line is the P-wave velocity, the blue line is the S-wave velocity, and the green line density. (Data was adopted from the RockHound Python library.)

Seismic velocity structure is the distribution and variation of seismic wave speeds within Earth's and other planetary bodies' subsurface. It is reflective of subsurface properties such as material composition, density, porosity, and temperature. Geophysicists rely on the analysis and interpretation of the velocity structure to develop refined models of the subsurface geology, which are essential in resource exploration, earthquake seismology, and advancing our understanding of Earth's geological development.

== History ==
The understanding of the Earth's seismic velocity structure has developed significantly since the advent of modern seismology. The invention of the seismogram in the 19th-century catalyzed the systematic study of seismic velocity structure by enabling the recording and analysis of seismic waves.

=== 20th century ===
The distribution of Global Seismographic Network stations. The map is generated by Python using Cartopy, data was adopted from the United States Geological Survey (USGS).

The field of seismology achieved significant breakthroughs in the 20th century.In 1909, Andrija Mohorovičić identified a significant boundary within the Earth known as the Mohorovičić discontinuity, which demarcates the transition between the Earth's crust and mantle with a notable increase in seismic wave speeds. This work was furthered by Beno Gutenberg, who identified the boundary at the core-mantle layer in the early to mid-20th century. The 1960s introduction of the World Wide Standardized Seismograph Network dramatically improved the collection and understanding of seismic data, contributing to the broader acceptance of plate tectonics theory by illustrating variations in seismic velocities.

Later, seismic tomography, a technique used to create detailed images of the Earth's interior by analyzing seismic waves, was propelled by the contributions of Keiiti Aki and Adam Dziewonski in the 1970s and 1980s, enabling a deeper understanding of the Earth's velocity structure. Their work laid the foundation for the Preliminary Reference Earth Model in 1981, a significant step toward modeling the Earth's internal velocities. The establishment of the Global Seismic Network in 1984 by Incorporated Research Institutions for Seismology further enhanced seismic monitoring capabilities, continuing the legacy of the WWSSN.

=== 21st century ===
The advancement in seismic tomography and the expansion of the Global Seismic Network, alongside greater computational power, have enabled more accurate modeling of the Earth's internal velocity structure. Recent progress focuses on the inner core's velocity features and applying methods like ambient noise tomography for improved imaging.

== Principle of seismic velocity structure ==
The study of seismic velocity structure, using the principles of seismic wave propagation, offers critical insights into the Earth's internal structure, material composition, and physical states. Variations in wave speed, influenced by differences in material density and state (solid, liquid, or gas), alter wave paths through refraction and reflection, as described by Snell's Law. P-waves, which can move through all states of matter and provide data on a range of depths, change speed based on the material's properties, such as type, density, and temperature. S-waves, in contrast, are constrained to solids and reveal information about the Earth's rigidity and internal composition, including the discovery of the outer core's liquid state since they cannot pass through it. The study of these waves' travel times and reflections offers a reconstructive view of the Earth's layered velocity structure.

This is an illustration of Snell's Law. A seismic wave coming with the path of the red line would refract when it passes through the surface of medium change. Seismic waves travelling at a critical angle (blue line) will be refracted critically with an angle of refraction equal to 90°.

An illustration of seismic reflection and refraction. Seismic refraction usually requires a wide incident angle so that the refracted seismic wave can travel critically (angle of refraction equals 90°).

== Average velocity structure of planetary bodies ==
Layer	Earth	Moon	Mars
Crust	P-wave: 6.0–7.0 km/s (continental) P-wave: 5.0–7.0 km/s (oceanic) S-wave: 3.5–4.0 km/s	P-wave: 5.1–6.8 km/s S-wave: 2.96–3.9 km/s	P-wave: 3.5–5 km/s S-wave: 2–3 km/s
Mantle	Upper Mantle: P-wave: 7.5–8.5 km/s S-wave: 4.5–5.0 km/s	P-wave: 7.7 km/s S-wave: 4.5 km/s	Upper Mantle: P-wave: 8 km/s S-wave: 4.5 km/s
Mantle	Lower Mantle: P-wave: 10–13 km/s S-wave: 5.5–7.0 km/s	P-wave: 7.7 km/s S-wave: 4.5 km/s	Lower Mantle: P-wave: 5.5 km/s S-waves: Not applicable (liquid)
Core	Outer Core: P-wave: 8.0–10 km/s S-waves: Not applicable (liquid)	Outer core: P-wave: 4 km/s S-waves: Not applicable (liquid)	P-wave: 5 km/s S-waves: Not applicable (liquid)
Core	Inner Core: P-wave: ~11 km/s S-wave: ~3.5 km/s	Inner core: P-wave: 4.4 km/s S-wave: 2.4 km/s	P-wave: 5 km/s S-waves: Not applicable (liquid)

== Velocity structure of Earth ==
The internal structural of the Earth.

Seismic waves traverse the Earth's layers at speeds that differ according to each layer's unique properties, with their velocities shaped by the respective temperature, composition, and pressure. The Earth's structure features distinct seismic discontinuities where these velocities shift abruptly, signifying changes in mineral composition or physical state.

=== Crust ===
- Average P-wave velocity: 6.0–7.0 km/s (continental); 5.0–7.0 km/s (oceanic)
- Average S-wave velocity: 3.5–4.0 km/s

Within the Earth's crust, seismic velocities increase with depth, mainly due to rising pressure, which makes materials denser. The relationship between crustal depth and pressure is direct; as the overlying rock exerts weight, it compacts underlying layers, reduces rock porosity, increases density, and can alter crystalline structures, thus accelerating seismic waves.

Crustal composition varies, affecting seismic velocities. The upper crust typically contains sedimentary rocks with lower velocities (2.0–5.5 km/s), while the lower crust consists of denser basaltic and gabbroic rocks, leading to higher velocities.

Although geothermal gradient, which refers to the increase in temperature with depth in the Earth's interior, can decrease seismic velocities, this effect is usually outweighed by the velocity-boosting impact of increased pressure.

The 1-dimensional velocity structure of the Earth, grey area indicating the transition zone. The change in velocity at the core-mantle boundary represents changes in physical state from solid to fluid. At the inner-core boundary, the core changes from fluid to solid as reflected by the increase in velocity.

=== Upper mantle ===
- Average P-wave velocity: 7.5–8.5 km/s
- Average S-wave velocity: 4.5–5.0 km/s

Seismic velocity in the upper mantle rises primarily due to increased pressure, similar to the crust but with a more pronounced effect on velocity. Additionally, pressure-induced mineral phase changes, where minerals rearrange their structures, in the upper mantle contribute to this acceleration. For example, olivine transforms into its denser polymorphs, wadsleyite and ringwoodite, at depths of approximately 410 and 660 km (250 and 410 mi) respectively, resulting in a more compact structure that facilitates faster seismic wave propagation in the transition zone.

=== Lower mantle ===
- Average P-wave velocity: 10–13 km/s
- Average S-wave velocity: 5.5–7.0 km/s

In the lower mantle, the rise in seismic velocity is driven by increasing pressure, which is greater here than in the upper layers, resulting in denser rock and faster seismic wave travel. Although thermal effects may lessen seismic velocity by softening the rock, the predominant factor in the lower mantle remains the increase in pressure.

=== Outer Core ===
- Average P-wave velocity: 8.0–10 km/s
- S-waves: Do not propagate as the outer core is liquid

In the outer core, seismic velocity significantly decreases due to its liquid state, which impedes the speed of seismic waves despite the high pressure. This sharp decline is observed at the core-mantle boundary, also referred to as the D'' region or Gutenberg discontinuity.

Furthermore, the reduction in seismic velocity in the outer core suggests the presence of lighter elements like oxygen, silicon, sulfur, and hydrogen, which lower the density of the outer core.

Illustration of the proposed "inner" inner core. Seismic wave propagation in the red line (along the rotational axis) is faster than that in the blue line (along the equatorial axis).

=== Inner core ===
- Average P-wave velocity: ~11 km/s
- Average S-wave velocity: ~3.5 km/s

The solid, high-density composition of the inner core, predominantly iron and nickel, results in increased seismic velocity compared to the liquid outer core. While light elements also present in the inner core modulate this velocity, their impact is relatively contained.

==== Anisotropy of inner core ====
The inner core is anisotropic, causing seismic waves to vary in speed depending on their direction of travel. P-waves, in particular, move more quickly along the inner core's rotational axis than across the equatorial plane. This suggests that Earth's rotation affects the alignment of iron crystals during the core's solidification.

There is also evidence suggesting a distinct transition zone ("inner" inner core), with a hypothesized transition zone some 250 to 400 km (160 to 250 mi) beneath the inner core boundary. This is inferred from anomalies in travel times for P-wave that travels through the inner core. This transition zone, perhaps 100 to 200 km (62 to 124 mi) thick, may provide insights into the alignment of iron crystals, the distribution of light elements, or Earth's accretion history.

Studying the inner core poses significant challenges for seismologists and geophysicists, given that it accounts for less than 1% of Earth's volume and is difficult for seismic waves to penetrate. Moreover, S-wave detection is challenging due to minimal compressional-shear wave conversion at the boundary and substantial attenuation within the inner core, leaving S-wave velocity uncertain and an area for future research.

=== Lateral variation of velocity structure ===
Lateral variation in seismic velocity is a horizontal change in seismic wave speeds across the Earth's crust due to differences in geological structures like rock types, temperature, and fluids presence, affecting seismic wave travel speed. This variation helps delineate tectonic plates and geological features and is key to resource exploration and understanding the Earth's internal heat flow.

=== Discontinuity ===
Discontinuities are zones or surfaces within the Earth that lead to abrupt changes in seismic velocity, revealing the composition and demarcating the boundaries between the Earth's layers.

The following are key discontinuities within the Earth:

- Mohorovičić discontinuity: the boundary between the crust and the mantle, located approximately 30–50 km (19–31 mi) below the continental crust and 5–10 km (3.1–6.2 mi) beneath the oceanic crust.
- 410 km (250 mi) discontinuity: a phase transition where olivine becomes wadsleyite.
- 520 km (320 mi) discontinuity: a phase transition where wadsleyite becomes ringwoodite.
- 660 km (410 mi) discontinuity: a phase transition where of ringwoodite to bridgmanite and ferropericlase.
- Gutenberg discontinuity: the core-mantle boundary, at approximately 2,890 km (1,800 mi) depth.
- Lehmann discontinuity: marking the inner core boundary, at approximately 5,150 km (3,200 mi) depth.

== Velocity structure of the Moon ==
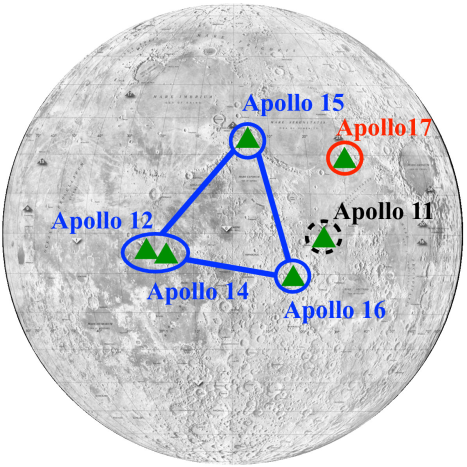
Location of Lunar seismometer. A total of five PSE were placed on the Moon, while PSE from Apollo 11 stopped functioning shortly after deployment.

Knowledge of the Moon's seismic velocity primarily stems from seismic records obtained by Apollo missions' Passive Seismic Experiment (PSE) stations. Between 1969 and 1972, five PSE stations were deployed on the lunar surface, with four operational until 1977. These four stations created a network on the near side of the moon, configured as an equilateral triangle with two stations at one vertex. This network recorded over 13,000 seismic events, and the gathered data remains a subject of ongoing study. The analysis has revealed four moonquake mechanisms: shallow, deep, thermal, and those caused by meteoroid impacts.

=== Crust ===
- Average P-wave velocity: 5.1–6.8 km/s
- Average S-wave velocity: 2.96–3.9 km/s

The seismic velocity on the Moon varies within its roughly 60 km thick crust, presenting a low seismic velocity at the surface. Velocity readings increase from 100 m/s near the surface to 4 km/s at a depth of 5 km and rise to 6 km/s at 25 km depth. At 25 km depth, a discontinuity presence, at which the seismic velocity increases abruptly to 7 km/s. This velocity then stabilizes, reflecting the consistent composition and hydrostatic pressure conditions at greater depths.

Seismic velocities within the Moon's approximately 60 km thick crust exhibit an initial low of 100 m/s at the surface, which escalates to 4 km/s at 5 km depth, and then to 6 km/s at 25 km depth where velocities sharply increase to 7 km/s and stabilize, revealing a consistent composition and pressure conditions in deeper layers.

Surface velocities are low due to the loose, porous nature of the regolith. Deeper, compaction increases velocities, with the region beyond 25 km depth characterized by dense, sealed anorthosite and gabbro layers, suggesting a crust with hydrostatic pressure. The Moon's geothermal gradient minimally reduces velocities by 0.1-0.2 km/s.

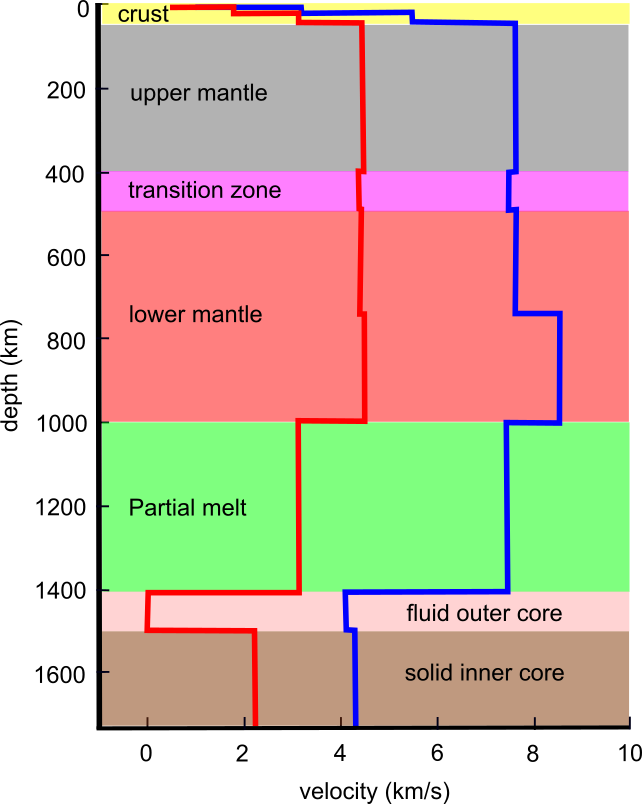
The 1-Dimensional velocity structure of the Moon. The changes in velocity represent changes in physical state or lunar composition. The red line is S-wave velocity, while blue line is P-wave velocity.

=== Mantle ===
- Average P-wave velocity: 7.7 km/s
- Average S-wave velocity: 4.5 km/s

Research into the seismic structure of the Moon's mantle is hampered by the scarcity of data. Analysis of moonquake waveforms suggests that seismic wave velocities in the upper mantle (ranging from 60 to 400 km (37 to 249 mi) in depth) exhibit a minor negative gradient, with S-wave speeds decreasing at rates between -6×10^{−4} to -13×10^{−4} km/s per kilometer. A decease in P-wave velocities has also been postulated. The data delineates a transition zone between 400 and 480 km (250 and 300 mi) depth, where a noticeable decrement in the velocities of both P- and S-waves occurs.

Uncertainty grows when probing the lower mantle, extending from 480 to 1,100 km (300 to 680 mi) beneath the lunar surface. Some studies detect a consistent decline in S-wave transmission, suggesting absorption or scattering phenomena, while other findings indicate that velocities for P- and S-waves may in fact rise.

Temperature increases with depth are believed to be the primary influence behind the observed drop in velocities within the upper mantle, suggesting a mantle heavily regulated by thermal gradients rather than compositional changes. The delineated transition zone implies a division between the chemically distinct upper and lower mantles, possibly explained by an uptick in iron concentration due to high pressure and thermal conditions at depth.

Deeper into the lower mantle, the debate over seismic characteristics continues, with theories of partial melting around the 1,000 km (620 mi) depth mark to justify the attenuation of S-wave velocities. This molten state may cause a segregation of materials, resulting in a concentration of magnesium-rich olivine in the lower regions and potentially affecting seismic speeds.

=== Core ===
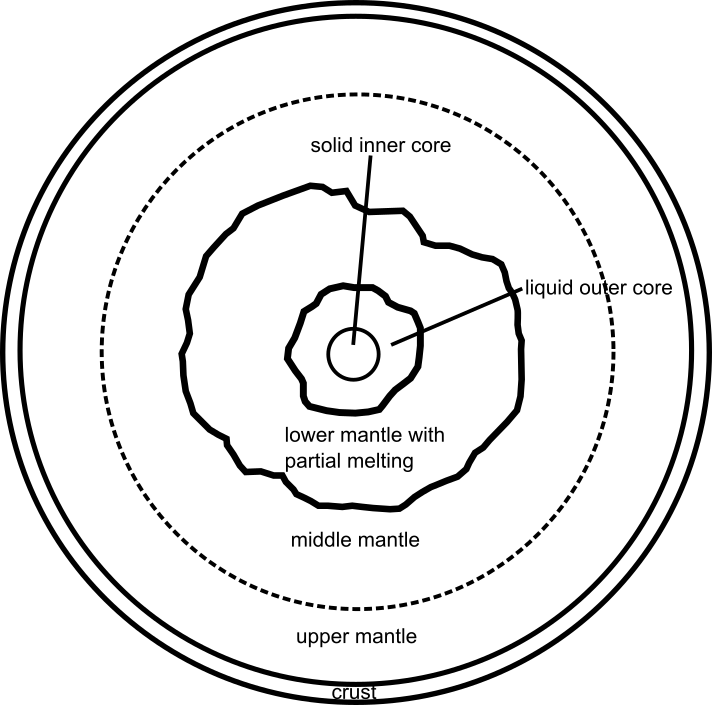
Schematic cross-section of the Moon. The liquid and the partially molten material might be aspherical.

Understanding the seismic velocities within the Moon's core presents challenges due to the limited data available.

Outer core:

- Average P-wave velocity: 4 km/s
- S-waves: Do not propagate as the outer core is liquid

Inner core:

- Average P-wave velocity: 4.4 km/s
- Average S-wave velocity: 2.4 km/s

The sharp decline in P-wave velocity at the mantle-core boundary suggests a liquid outer core, transitioning from 7.7 km/s in the mantle to 4 km/s in the outer core. The inability of S-waves to traverse this zone further confirms its fluid nature with molten iron sulphate.

An increase in seismic velocities upon reaching the inner core intimates a transition to a solid phase. The presence of solid iron-nickel alloys, potentially alloyed with lighter elements, is deduced from this increase.

Current geophysical models posit a relatively diminutive Lunar core, with the liquid outer core accounting for 1-3% of the Moon's total mass and the entire core constituting about 15-25% of the lunar mass. While some lunar models suggest the possibility of a core, its existence and characteristics are not unequivocally required by the observed data.

=== Lateral variation of seismic velocity structure ===
Crustal velocity also varies laterally, particularly in impact basins, where meteoroid collisions have compacted the substrate, resulting in higher velocities due to reduced porosity.

Lateral variations in the Moon's seismic velocity structure are marked by differences in the crust's physical properties, especially within impact basins. The velocity increases in these regions are attributed to meteoroid impacts, which have compacted the lunar substrate, thereby increasing its density and reducing porosity. This phenomenon has been studied using seismic data from lunar missions, which show that the Moon's crustal structure varies significantly with location, reflecting its complex impact history and internal processes.

== Velocity structure of Mars ==
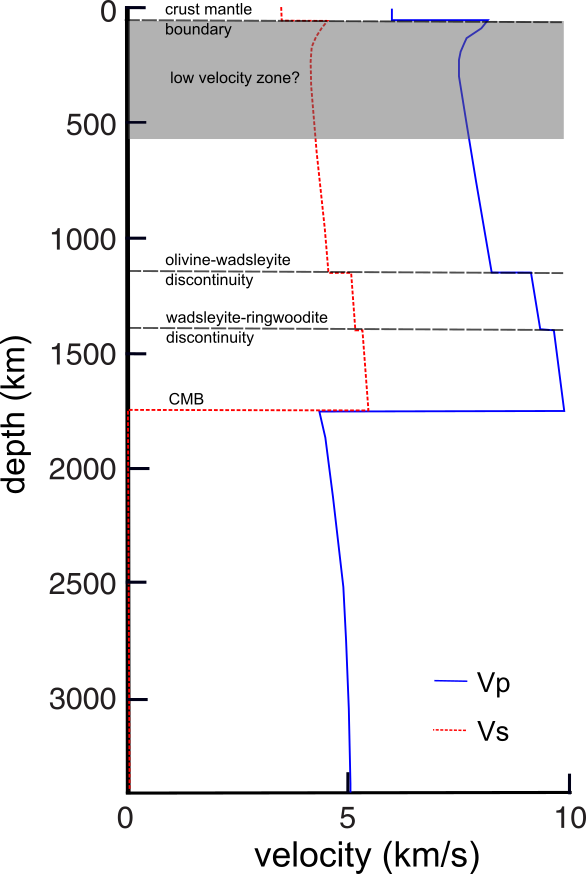
The 1-Dimensional velocity structure of Mars. The changes in velocity represent changes in physical state or Martian composition.

The investigation into Mars's seismic velocity has primarily relied on models and the data gathered by the InSight mission, which landed on the planet in 2018. By September 30, 2019, InSight had detected 174 seismic events. Before InSight, the Viking 2 lander attempted to collect seismic data in the 1970s, but it captured only a limited number of local events, which did not yield conclusive insights.

=== Crust ===
- Average P-wave velocity: 3.5–5 km/s
- Average S-wave velocity: 2–3 km/s

The crust of Mars, ranging from 10 to 50 km (6.2 to 31.1 mi) in thickness, exhibits increasing seismic velocity as depth increases, attributable to rising pressure. The upper crust is characterized by low density and high porosity, leading to reduced seismic velocity. Two key discontinuities have been observed: one within the crust at a depth of 5 to 10 km (3.1 to 6.2 mi), and another which is likely the crust-mantle boundary, occurring at a depth of 30 to 50 km (19 to 31 mi).

=== Mantle ===
Upper mantle:

- Average P-wave velocity: 8 km/s
- Average S-wave velocity: 4.5 km/s

Lower mantle:

- P-wave: 5.5 km/s
- S-waves: Not applicable (liquid)

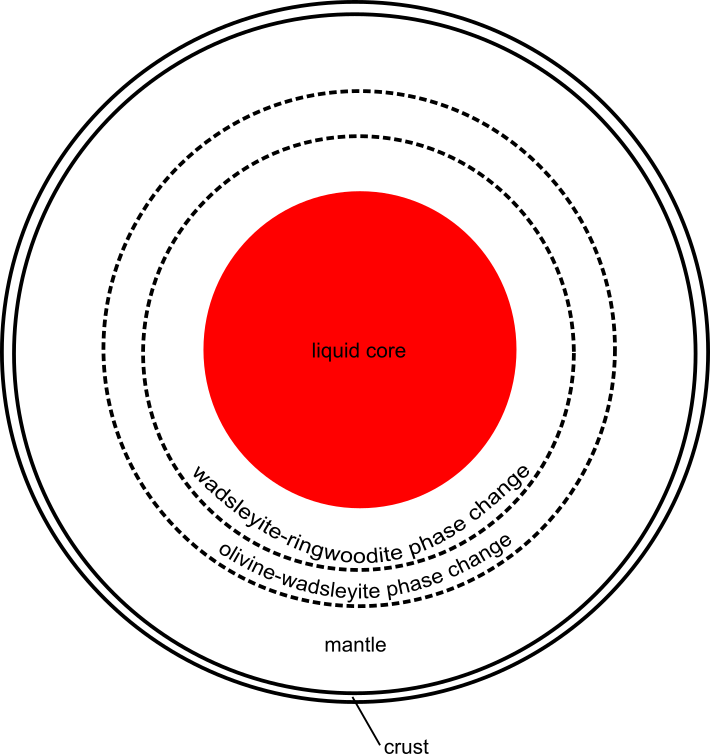
An illustration of the Internal structure of Mars. The core is hypothesised to be liquid.

The Martian mantle, composed of iron-rich rocks, facilitates the transmission of seismic waves at high speeds. Research indicates a variation in seismic velocities between depths of 400 and 600 km (250 and 370 mi), where S-wave speeds decrease while P-wave speeds remain constant or increase slightly. This region is known as the Low Velocity Zone (LVZ) in the Martian upper mantle and may be caused by a static layer overlying a convective mantle. The reduction in velocity at the LVZ is likely due to high temperatures and moderate pressures.

Martian mantle research has also identified two discontinuities at depths of approximately 1,100 and 1,400 km (680 and 870 mi). These discontinuities suggest phase transitions from olivine to wadsleyite and from wadsleyite to ringwoodite, analogous to the Earth's mantle phase changes at depths of 410 and 660 km (250 and 410 mi). However, Mars's mantle composition differs from Earth's as it does not have a lower mantle predominated by bridgmanite.

Recent study suggested the presence of a molten lower mantle layer in the Mars which could significantly affect the interpretation of seismic data and our understanding of the planet's thermal history.

=== Core ===
- Average P-wave velocity: 5 km/s
- S-waves: Do not propagate as the outer core is liquid

Scientific evidence suggests that Mars has a substantial liquid core, inferred from S-wave transmission patterns that indicate these waves do not pass through liquid. The core is likely composed of iron and nickel with a significant proportion of lighter elements, inferred from its lower-than-expected density.

The presence of a solid inner core on Mars, comparable to Earth's, is currently the subject of scientific debate. No definitive evidence has yet confirmed the nature of the inner core, leaving its existence and characteristics as topics for further research.

=== Lateral variation of velocity structure ===
Lateral variations in the seismic velocity structure of Mars have been revealed by data from the InSight mission, indicating an intricately layered subsurface. InSight's seismic experiments suggest that these variations reflect differences in crustal thickness and composition, potentially caused by volcanic and tectonic processes unique to Mars. Such variations also provide evidence for the presence of a liquid layer above the core, suggesting a complex interplay of thermal and compositional factors affecting the planet's evolution. Further analysis of marsquake data may illuminate the relationship between these lateral variations and the Martian mantle's convective dynamics.

== Velocity structure of Enceladus ==
Research on Enceladus's subsurface composition has provided theoretical velocity profiles in anticipation of future exploratory missions. While Enceladus's interior is poorly understood, scientists agree on a general structure consisting of an outer icy shell, a subsurface ocean, and a rocky core. In a recent study, three models—single core, thick ice, and layered core—were proposed to delineate Enceladus' internal characteristics.

According to these models, seismic velocities are expected to decrease from the ice shell to the ocean, reflecting transitions from porous, fractured ice to a more fluid state. Conversely, velocities are predicted to rise within the solid silicate core, illustrating the stark contrast between the moon's various layers.

The 1-Dimensional velocity structure of three models of Enceladus (reproduced from Dapré and Irving, 2024).

Internal structure models of Enceladus: Single Core; Thick Ice; and Layered Core

== Future plan ==
Seismic exploration of celestial bodies has so far been limited to the Moon and Mars. However, future space missions are set to extend seismic studies to other entities in the Solar System.

The proposed Europa Lander Mission, slated for a launch window between 2025 and 2030, will investigate the seismic activity of Jupiter's moon, Europa. This mission plans to deploy the Seismometer to Investigate Ice and Ocean Structure (SIIOS), an instrument designed by the University of Arizona to withstand Europa's harsh, cold, and radiative environment. SIIOS's goal is to provide insight into Europa's icy crust and subterranean ocean.

In conjunction with its Artemis program to the Moon, NASA has also funded initiatives under the Development and Advancement of Lunar Instrumentation (DALI) program. Among these, the Seismometer for a Lunar Network (SLN) project stands out. The SLN aims to facilitate the creation of a lunar seismometer network by integrating seismometers into future lunar landers or rovers. This initiative is part of NASA's broader effort to prepare for continued exploration of the Moon's geology.

== Methods ==
The study of seismic velocity structure is typically conducted through the observation of seismic data coupled with inverse modeling, which involves adjusting a model based on observed data to infer the properties of the Earth's interior. Here are some methods used to study seismic velocity structure:

Refraction Seismology	Seismic refraction is a geophysical method for characterizing subsurface geological features. It operates on the principle that seismic waves—specifically P-waves and S-waves—refract, or bend, when they encounter layers with varying seismic velocities. By analyzing the travel times of these waves as they are refracted at different angles, geophysicists can infer the depth and composition of underlying strata. The technique typically employs man-made seismic sources, such as controlled explosions or the striking of the ground with a sledgehammer, to generate the necessary waves. Despite its utility in providing insights into subsurface structures, seismic refraction has certain limitations. It can be costly to execute, and its resolution is constrained by the wavelength of the seismic waves used, which generally range between 200 m and 1 km.	In refraction seismology, direct wave (blue) arrive the receivers first, followed by headwave (red). The point where the direct wave and headwave meet is known as the crossover point.
Reflection Seismology	Seismic reflection capitalizes on the echo of seismic waves off boundaries where acoustic impedance varies between earth layers. By recording the differences in travel time and wave amplitude, researchers correlate these measurements with subsurface properties to map out velocity structures, akin to seismic refraction but focusing on wave reflections.	Seismic waves reflected at different boundaries are picked up by receivers at different location.
Seismic Tomography	Seismic tomography employs the travel times of waves from earthquakes to create three-dimensional subsurface models, revealing variations in seismic velocities linked to material differences, temperature, and composition. Diverging from refraction and reflection methods, which use artificial sources, tomography utilizes natural seismic activity for deeper Earth exploration. This technique is instrumental in investigating geodynamic processes, including mantle convection and plate tectonics.	By analysing seismic waves generated by earthquakes, the velocity structure can be studied which can reflect the subsurface condition where the seismic wave propagated.
Receiver Function Analysis	Receiver function analysis is a seismic method that interprets waveform data to study the conversions and reflections of seismic waves at subsurface interfaces like the Mohorovičić discontinuity. It uses converted S-waves produced when P-waves meet these interfaces to infer depth and seismic properties. Enhanced computing power and extensive seismic networks have advanced this technique, allowing detailed mapping of various geological structures, from sedimentary basin depths to the Mohorovičić discontinuity's topography and beyond.	Different P-wave and S-wave phases are picked up by a receiver for the analysis of velocity structure.
Ambient Noise Tomography (ANT)	Ambient Noise Tomography is a seismic imaging technique that uses the Earth's background noise, stemming from sources like ocean waves, storms, and traffic, to map its seismic velocity structure. It involves cross-correlating noise records from multiple seismic stations to extract coherent waveforms, akin to those expected from earthquake activity. This process emulates the response recorded if an earthquake had originated at one station and been detected at another, following Green's function for wave propagation. It is particularly effective in delivering high-resolution subsurface images for areas with insufficient seismic events.	
Full Waveform Inversion (FWI)	Full Waveform Inversion is an iterative method used to fine-tune models of the Earth's subsurface by adjusting them until the synthetic seismograms they produce align with actual observed data. This technique utilizes complete seismic waveforms, not just travel times, enabling scientists to discern more nuanced features in the subsurface. Its application spans from small-scale reservoir imaging, crucial in oil and gas exploration, to larger, regional-scale models for understanding tectonic activity.	

== Applications of velocity structure ==
Applications of seismic velocity structure encompass a range of fields where understanding the Earth's subsurface is crucial:

Seismic Imaging and Interpretation	Seismic velocity structure analysis enables the generation of subsurface geological imagery, facilitating the identification and characterization of structures like faults and folds. At a larger tectonic scale, it reveals prominent features, including subducting slabs, mantle plumes, and rift zones, thereby providing a comprehensive view of the Earth's internal and plate dynamics.
Resource Exploration	In the fields of oil, gas, and mineral exploration, knowledge of the seismic velocity structure is vital for discovering reserves and strategizing extraction processes. This understanding helps delineate the size, shape, and physical properties of potential resources, guiding drilling decisions and optimizing recovery.
Earthquake Hazard Management	The seismic velocity structure is instrumental in deciphering the propagation of seismic waves during earthquakes. It offers valuable insights into the underlying mechanisms of seismic events, contributing to earthquake hazard assessment and the development of urban planning strategies to mitigate seismic risks.
Volcanology	Investigating seismic velocity structures under volcanoes is key to identifying magma chambers and comprehending volcanic formations. This knowledge assists in predicting volcanic activity and assessing potential eruption risks, which is essential for informing hazard preparedness and mitigation efforts.
Engineering Geology and Environmental Geology	Seismic velocity structures play a crucial role in construction project site investigations by helping to identify geological features like faults and areas with potentially problematic materials like clay, which can affect the stability and safety of the structures. Additionally, this technique is employed in environmental studies to monitor subsurface contamination and to assess groundwater resources, ensuring sustainable and safe development.
Planetary Geophysics	Velocity structure analysis can be applied to other planetary bodies, such as the Moon and Mars, to understand their internal structure and geological history. Seismic velocity structure analysis extends beyond Earth, applying to other celestial bodies like the Moon and Mars to unravel their internal compositions and geological evolution. This analysis is pivotal in planetary science, providing clues about the formation, tectonic activity, and potential for resources on these extraterrestrial surfaces.

== Limitation/Uncertainty ==
- S-wave velocity of the inner Earth's core

Investigating Earth's inner core through seismic waves presents significant challenges. Directly observing seismic waves that traverses the inner core is difficult due to weak signal conversion at the core boundaries and high attenuation within the core. Recent techniques like earthquake late-coda correlation, which utilises the later part of a seismogram, provide estimates for the inner core's shear wave velocity but are not without challenges.

- Isotropic assumptions

Seismic velocity studies often assume isotropy, treating Earth's subsurface as having uniform properties in all directions. This simplification is practical for analysis but may not be accurate. The inner core and mantle, for example, likely demonstrate anisotropic, or directionally dependent, properties, which can affect the accuracy of seismic interpretations.

- Dimensional considerations

Seismic models are frequently one-dimensional, considering changes in Earth's properties with depth but neglecting lateral variations. Although this method eases computation, it fails to account for the planet's complex three-dimensional structure, potentially misleading our understanding of subsurface characteristics.

- Non-uniqueness of Inverse Modelling

Seismic velocity structures are inferred through inverse modeling, fitting theoretical models to observed data. However, different models can often explain the same data, leading to non-unique solutions. This issue is compounded when inverse problems are poorly conditioned, where small data variations can suggest drastically different subsurface structures.

- Data Limitations for the Moon and Mars Seismic Studies

In contrast to Earth, the seismic datasets for the Moon and Mars are sparse. The Apollo missions deployed a handful of seismometers across the Moon, and Mars's seismic data is limited to the InSight mission's findings. This scarcity restricts the resolution of velocity models for these celestial bodies and introduces greater uncertainty in interpreting their internal structures.

== See also ==
- Seismic wave
- Seismic tomography
- Low-velocity zone
