= Banana Doughnut theory =

Model in seismic tomography

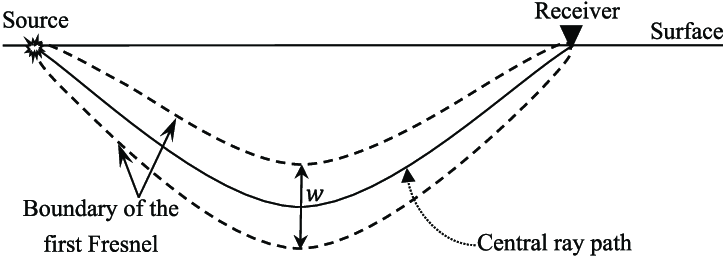
Schematic illustration of the first Fresnel zone for one source-receiver pair. W indicates the width of the first Fresnel zone.

The banana doughnut theory - also sometimes known as Born-Fréchet kernel theory, or finite-frequency theory - is a model in seismic tomography that describes the shape of the Fresnel zone along the entire ray path of a body wave. This theory suggests that the area that influences the ray velocity is the surrounding material and not the infinitesimally small ray path. This surrounding material forms a tube enclosing the ray, but does not incorporate the ray path itself.

The name was coined by Princeton University postdoc Henk Marquering. This theory gets the name "banana" because the tube of influence along the entire ray path from source to receiver is an arc resembling the fruit. The "doughnut" part of the name comes from the ring shape of the cross-section. The ray path is a hollow banana, or a banana-shaped doughnut.

Mohammad Youssof and colleagues (Youssof et al., 2015) of Rice University and the University of Copenhagen conducted one of the studies that compared both the Born-Fréchet kernel theory and the infinitesimal geometrical ray theory when they used the same datasets to see the resolving power on real datasets from the South African Seismic Array [SASE] in Kalahari (Carlson et al., 1996) and compared their results when using one and multiple frequencies to previous studies by Fouch et al. (2004), Priestley et al. (2006), and Silver et al. (2001). Youssof et al. (2015) models are similar in some ways, but they also have significant differences which include new results of cratonic boundaries, the keels' depth, and their structures.
