= Maurycy Pius Rudzki =

Polish geophysicist

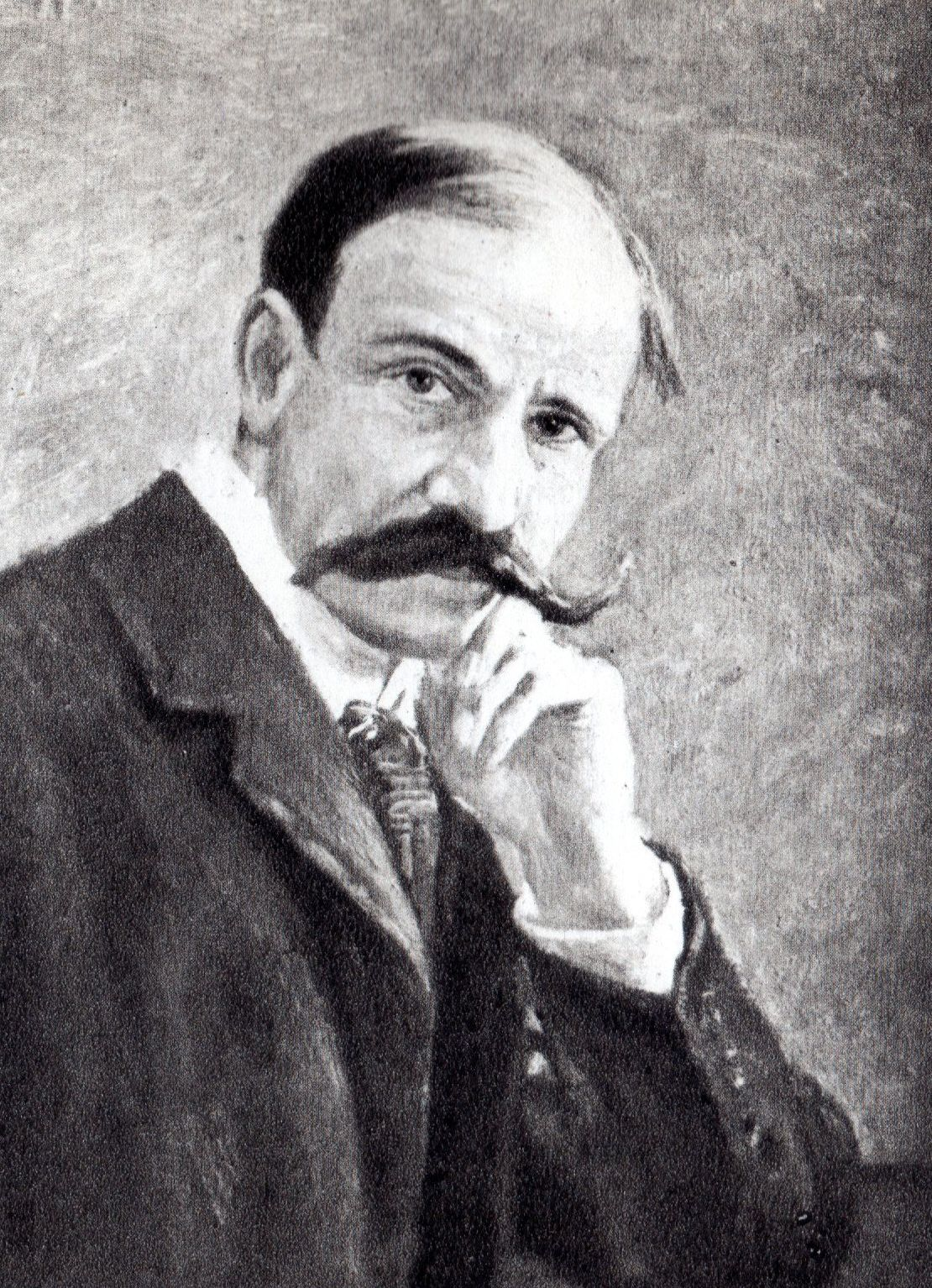
- Born: 1862
- Died: 1916 (aged 53–54)
- Known for: Seismic Anisotropy
- Scientific career
- Fields: Geophysics
- Workplaces: Jagiellonian University

Maurycy Pius Rudzki (1862–1916) was the first person to call himself a professor of geophysics. He held the Chair of Geophysics at the Jagiellonian University in Cracow, and established the Institute of Geophysics there in 1895. His research specialty was elastic anisotropy, as applied to wave propagation in the earth, and he established many of the fundamental results in that field.

== Publications ==
- Fizyka Ziemi (1909)
- Physik der Erde (1911)
