= Subsurface mapping by ambient noise tomography =

Subsurface mapping by ambient noise tomography is the mapping underground geological structures under the assistance of seismic signals. Ambient noise, which is not associated with the earthquake, is the background seismic signals. Given that the ambient noises have low frequencies in general, the further classification of ambient noise include secondary microseisms, primary microseisms, and seismic hum, based on different range of frequencies. We can utilize the ambient noise data collected by seismometers (or geophones) to create images for the subsurface under the following processes. Since the ambient noise is considered as diffuse wavefield, we can correlate the filtered ambient noise data from a pair of seismic stations (or seismometers) to find the velocities of seismic wavefields. A 2-dimensional or 3-dimensional velocity map, showing the spatial velocity difference of the subsurface, can thus be created for observing the geological structures. Subsurface mapping by ambient noise tomography can be applied in different fields, such as detecting the underground void space, monitoring landslides, and mapping the crustal and upper mantle structure.

== Characteristics of ambient noise ==
Characteristic of ambient noise refers to several quantities that can distinguish different ambient noise, including origin, frequency, property, and temporal variation.

=== Nature of ambient noise ===
Ambient noise, as the rising star of the seismic source for seismic research other than earthquake, accounts for the naturally and anthropogenically produced seismic vibration of the background. This is different from the active seismic source created solely for seismic research or large seismic source from earthquake. Ocean is the most dominant natural origin of the ambient noise field.

Any seismic source is transmitted as either body waves or surface waves, where ambient noise is no exception. Summary of their properties are shown below.

Seismic Wave
Wave Type	Body/Surface	Description
P-wave	Body	1. Can pass through solid and liquid.; 2. Particle movement parallel to wave movement.
S-wave	Body	1. Can pass through solid only.; 2. Particle movement perpendicular to wave movement.
Rayleigh wave	Surface	1. Include both longitudinal & transverse motions.; 2. Amplitude decreases exponentially with increasing distance from surface.
Love wave	Surface	1. Wave speed lower than P-wave & S-wave, but higher than Rayleigh wave.; 2. Horizonal particle movement perpendicular to wave propagation.

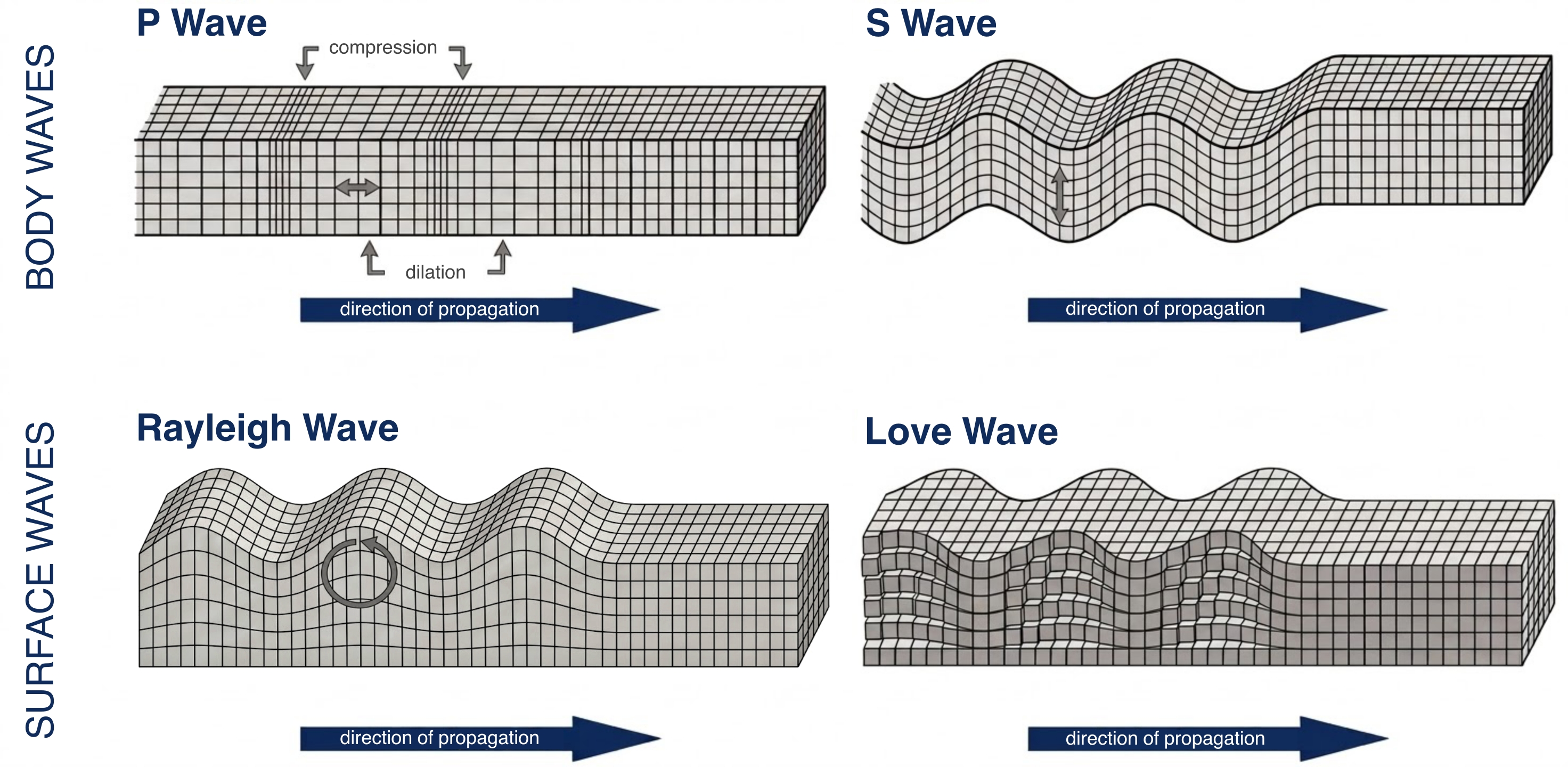
Overview Seismic Waves

The dominance of seismic wave transmission of ambient noise depends on several factors, while the research technique would determine the major type of seismic wave collected for ambient noise. For example, seismologists would often use spatial auto-correlation (SPAC) method which involve the collection and analysis of surface wave.

=== Frequency of ambient noise ===
Ambient noise is often known as microseism, where ‘micro’ means very small, and ‘seism’ is an alternative name for earthquake. It can be further classified based on their frequency ranges, namely hum, primary microseism and secondary microseism. The table below shows the comparison of frequency range between the microseisms, arranged from increasing order. Figure a also shows graph of the frequency range of microseisms.

Frequency Range of Microseisms
Microseisms	Frequency Range (Hz)
Hum	9×10^{−3} - 8×10^{−2}
Primary microseism	9×10^{−3} - 8×10^{−2}
Secondary microseism	3×10^{−2} - 1

=== Origin of ambient noise ===
Ambient noise can be further classified into two major categories based on the origins of the noise.

==== Anthropogenic ====
Anthropogenic ambient noise originates from human activities. Considering the ocean ambient noise source as an example, there are noises that are created unintentionally by human activities, such as shipping and offshore engineering work. During the shipping activity, mechanical waves can be driven up along the water surface and propagate through the ocean. Offshore engineering work can also produce surface waves. Engineering works include but are not limited to borehole drilling, foundation construction and geophysical surveys. Shoreline reclamation has been actively carried out by many countries to create more land for urban development. Those engineering works can thus also be carried out offshore. The processes of offshore drilling and exploration create continuous mechanical waves that can also propagate through the ocean.

In continental urban areas, there are more examples of human activities creating background noise. Other than engineering works, urban traffic is the major component of urban ambient noise. Although the mechanical waves of the continent are not as visible than those from the ocean, they can still be transmitted via the soil and rock layers. Cars travelling on the road can produce repeatable vibration on the road which can then be transmitted through the soil layers.

==== Natural noise ====
Natural ambient noise refers to the background noise produced from the natural events. The natural environment is not stationary but constantly changing because nature itself is continuously modified by weather, tectonic movements and biogenic activities. They can also produce low frequency background noise. Some of the most significant events are listed below.

Wind can induce weak ocean waves propagating through the ocean. The varying atmospheric pressure was hypothesized as the origin before but is inadequate to support the existence of all types of microseisms. Instead, ocean waves are proposed as the alternative origin of natural ambient noise. For example, the ocean swells interact with the sea coast to induce hum and primary microseisms, and the interaction of sea waves with opposite direction can produce secondary microseisms.

=== Variation of ambient noise ===
To evaluate whether the collected ambient noise source can be further analysed, consider if there are any regular variations or patterns of certain ambient noise source. Referring to the urban noise source, it may experience a daily variation, where the human activities are conducted mostly in daytime and reduced in nighttime. The ambient noise should thus increase in the daytime while reducing at night. Apart from the temporal variation, the spatial variation can also matter. For example, the commercial shipping is usually concentrated on certain routes. The corresponding amplitude of ambient noise should also decrease when moving away from the shipping routes. Nevertheless, it is still difficult to distinguish the ambient noise sources.

== Seismic velocity structure modelling ==
Seismic velocity structure modelling is the modelling technique showing the velocity difference of seismic waves across areas. The modelling process involves some steps, including cross-correlation, Green's function, and inversion. The usage of ambient noise as source of seismic velocity structure modelling rises from 2001 when seismologists tried to correlate the diffused ambient noise wave fields' Velocity structure modelling are complex and require multiple mathematical calculations.

=== Pre-processing of ambient noise data ===
The pre-processing of ambient noise data refers to the filtering of the raw data before proceeding to further analysis (cross-correlation, inversion). Raw seismic data can be collected by either geophones, seismometers, or from authorized official bodies. There are also public ambient noise source maps available in recent years. Since the seismometers collect all ambient seismic signals from all directions, the produced seismic waveforms may not reflect the actual background seismic vibrations. Instead, they often contain some occasional seismic signals from earthquakes and other instruments, which is unnecessary in general and thus required to be removed.

==== Cross-correlation of ambient noise ====
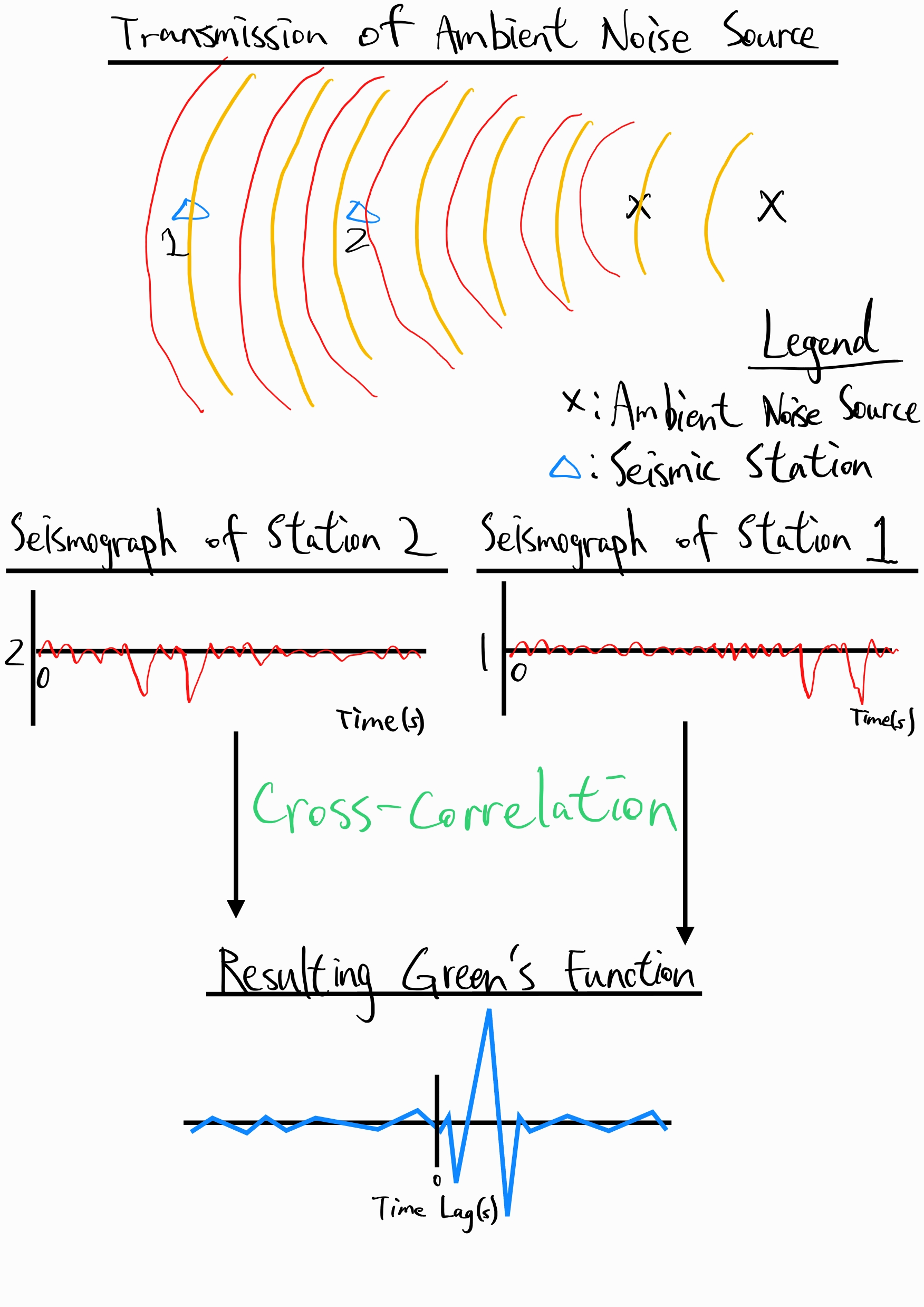
Figure 1: Simplest situation of ambient noise cross correlation

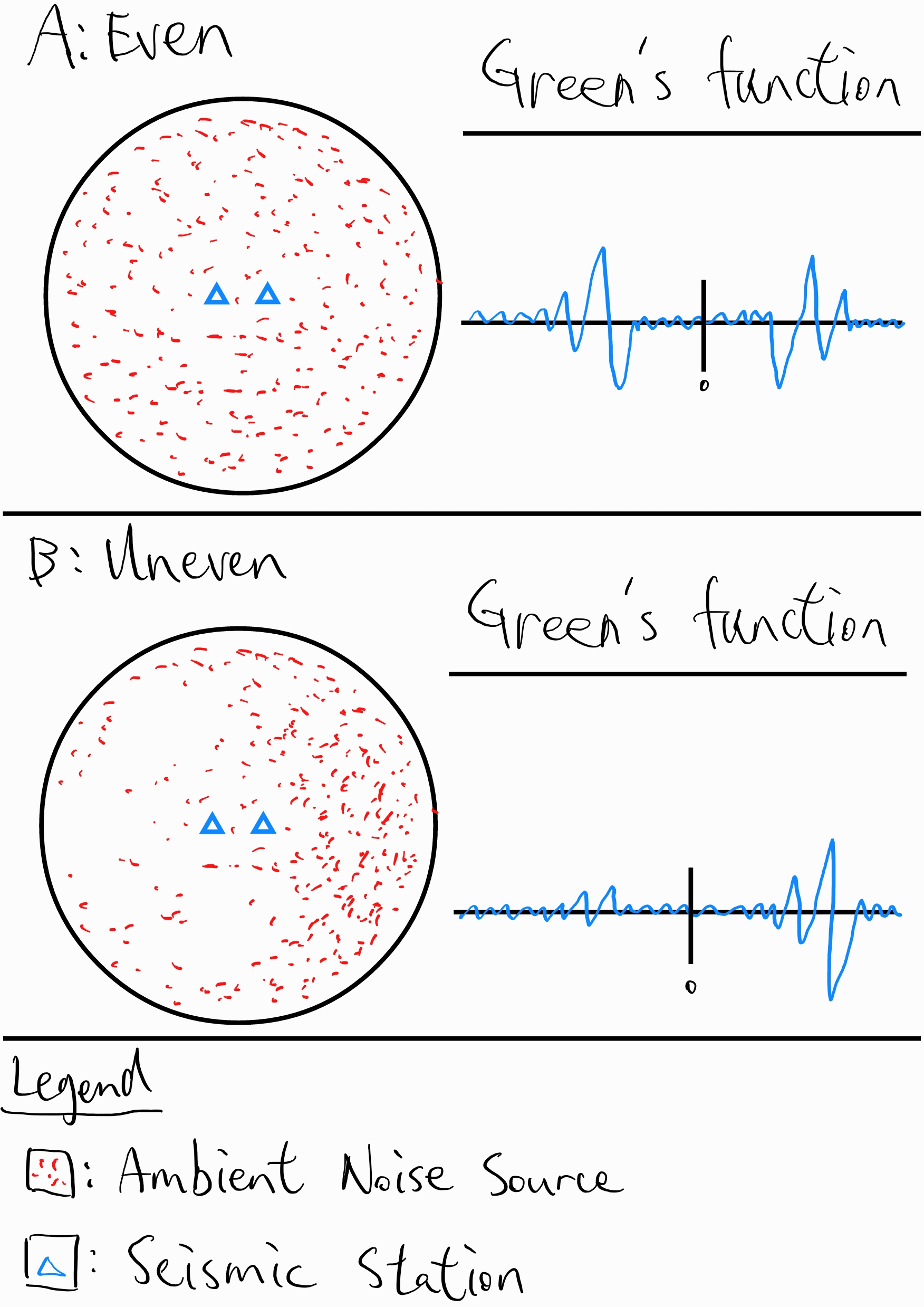
Figure 2: Resulting Green's functions in different distribution of ambient noise sources

Ambient noise cross correlation is the process of finding the receiving time lag of ambient noise sources between two nearby stations. Figure 1 illustrates the simplest case of ambient noise cross-correlation. For a pair of receivers (or seismometers or seismic stations) at different locations, the ambient noise signals would be received at a different time, assumed that they travel at the same velocity at the subsurface. The products of cross-correlation of those signals are new seismic waveforms, namely Green's function. Regarding the case with multiple ambient noise sources, the shape of the cross correlation function depends on whether the ambient noise sources are evenly distributed across a certain area. For the most ideal situation where the ambient noise signals are distributed evenly across all directions, the Green’s function would be highly symmetrical (see Figure 2).

==== Inversion ====
Inversion is one of the techniques used in ambient noise tomography. Inversion of the Green’s function is used to retrieve the subsurface properties of the Earth, where seismic velocity is one of the important quantities. It is a crucial step in ambient noise tomography. Inversion in seismic analysis can be treated as finding the original factors of the subsurface that induce the current transmission of the ambient noise signals. Inversion of the Green’s function is conducted linearly in the early ambient noise tomography studies with the assumption that the velocity variation is small. Forward model, as the essential process of inversion, is used to estimate the closest quantities of the earth subsurface properties. The cross-correlated seismic waves can be inverted either linearly or non-linearly.

=== Linkage of geological structure with velocity zone ===
Before interpreting the velocity zone, it is necessary to understand how the seismic velocity varies. In general, P and S wave travel faster in high density medium. Only P wave can travel through any medium while S wave can only travel through solids. Therefore, a low velocity zone can indicate some vacuum space in the subsurface layer, such as void space and faults. Conversely, a high velocity zone may refer to the lithology with closely packed rocks, such as igneous rock. To correlate the velocity zone with geological structure, it is necessary to consider the size and shape of the velocity zones, and more importantly, the resolution of the subsurface velocity image. The resolution of the image can affect the scale of the subsurface we can interpret. Sometimes, fieldwork is also needed in order to better correlate the velocity map.

==== Example of subsurface structure ====
Here are some examples of the subsurface structures and features, including but not limited to the following.

- Void and hole space
- Fault
- Fold
- Oil and gas
- Joint
- Fracture
- Groundwater

== See also ==
- Seismology
- Seismic Interferometry
- Inversion
- Green's function
