= Receiver function =

The receiver function technique is a way to image the structure of the Earth and its internal boundaries by using the information from teleseismic earthquakes recorded at a three-component seismograph.

A teleseismic P-wave will generate P-to-S conversions at boundaries, such as the Moho (crust-mantle boundary), beneath the seismograph. The difference in travel time between the generated S-wave and P-wave contains information about the depth to the boundary and about the P- and S-wave velocities. If further reverberations are included, more detailed structure can be resolved. This is done by deconvolution of the incoming vertical and longitudinal components of the seismogram, which removes the common part of the components - namely, the source and travel path information. The resulting waveform is the receiver function.

Similarly, a teleseismic S-wave will generate an S-to-P conversion beneath the seismic station.

== Method ==
Incident P and S wave phases for a receiver function.

As a P wave in the mantle passes upwards through the Moho, it is partially converted into an S wave. Both the P-wave and S-wave (known as Ps) are picked up by the seismometer on the Earth's surface and can be used to analyze discontinuities within the Earth. In addition to these P and Ps waves, additional phases are created by multiple reflections. These phases include: PpPmp PpSmp, PpPms, and PpSms, as well as PsPmp, PsSmp, PsPms and PsSms. (See seismic phase notation for more info). The phases for which the last "leg" is a P-wave (P, Ps, Smp, etc.) are dominantly recorded on the vertical component of the seismograph, whereas the phases for which the last "leg" is an S-wave (Ps, Pp, Sms, etc.) are dominantly recorded on the horizontal component.

The primary method for creating a receiver function is based on analyzing the product of waves that pass from the mantle through the Moho boundary. The large compositional differences between the crust and the mantle cause large differences in seismic waves as they pass through the discontinuity. Receiver functions use Snell's law refraction of P waves and converted S waves to estimate the depth of the Moho. They are only generated clearly if the central angle (angle subtended at the center of the Earth) between the seismic event and the seismograph station is between 30 and 95 degrees (between about 3300 and 8900 km separation). The method is also most effective when the seismic event causing the waves occurs significantly below the Moho, which is important to avoid surface interference.

Over time, several seismic events can occur in the same geographic area, with each event causing a corresponding vertical waveform and horizontal waveform. Once several observations have been collected, the waveforms can be summed together for the vertical component and for the horizontal component. The summed seismogram reduces random noise and makes it easier to see a pattern in the data. By visual inspection, or more commonly by deconvolution of the two waveforms, it is possible to identify each of the relevant phases of the P wave conversions. With the timing of the phases, it is then possible to model the seismic velocities within the crust and the Moho depth beneath the seismic station.

=== Stacking ===
Where there are many adjacent seismograph stations, it is possible to "stack" receiver function data across seismograph stations to build a 2D or even 3D model of the depth of the Moho. This is possible because each station can determine the depth of the Moho at its own location (essentially a 1D measurement). Data from multiple individual data points from adjacent stations can be grouped together and plotted side by side to create a unified graph of the Moho depth over a given area.

For deeper interfaces in the mantle, the moveout of Ps converted phases can be corrected for by delaying the time window of the horizontal-component seismograms by a predicted delay time. This delay will align the phases of any pulses on the horizontal components that suffer the predicted time delays.

== Applications ==
Receiver functions contain detailed information on the average seismic velocities within the crust and on the depth of the Moho at a specific location. This data alone can be useful in obtaining information about a specific location. But when receiver function data from one seismic station is combined with data from many other stations, it is possible to build a detailed map of the Moho depth and of seismic velocity across a large geographic area. The dipping top surfaces of subducting lithosphere is often sufficiently sharp to generate P-to-S converted phases that can be detected at depths up to 100 km or more.

This data can be used for a variety of purposes. It can be used to note variations in the depth of the crust. Receiver functions have been used, for example, to discover depressions in the Moho below mountains in southwest Japan. This data can also be used to better understand earthquakes that cause natural disasters. Additionally, maps of seismic velocities and crustal thickness are useful as baseline data for additional seismological studies.

Data from receiver functions can also be used in conjunction with data, such as data from controlled source seismology, to provide higher resolution 3D maps of the Earth's crust.
