= FMQ =

FMQ is a three letter acronym that can refer to:

- First Minister's Questions in the devolved parliaments of the United Kingdom
  - First Minister's Questions (Scottish Parliament) in Scotland
  - First Minister's Questions (Northern Ireland Assembly) in Northern Ireland
- Fayalite-magnetite-quartz, a mineral redox buffer
- FMQ League, a group of Japanese FM radio stations
- Federación Mundial de Quiropráctica, the Spanish-language name of the World Federation of Chiropractic
