= Daniel Frost (earth scientist) =

British geoscientist

Daniel Frost FRS
- Born: 29 November 1970 (age 55); Wolverhampton
- Education: University of London; University of Bristol
- Known for: Geochemistry; Geophysics
- Awards: James B. Macelwane Medal 2006; Leibniz Prize 2016
- Scientific career
- Workplaces: Carnegie Institution; University of Bayreuth
- Website: Official website

Daniel James Frost (born 29 November 1970) is a British earth scientist and Professor of Experimental Geosciences at the University of Bayreuth. His research focuses on the nature of Earth's deep interior, including the chemistry of the mantle and how it led to the development of the atmosphere, and the physical and chemical processes through which planets form.

== Life and career ==
Frost was born in Wolverhampton in 1970. After studying chemistry and geology at the University of London, he received a PhD from the University of Bristol, which focused on high-pressure and high-temperature properties of carbon dioxide. Afterwards, he took a two-year post-doctoral fellowship at the Geophysical Laboratory of the Carnegie Institution in Washington D.C. before moving to the University of Bayreuth in 1997. In 2007 he was appointed Academic Director, and became Professor and deputy director of the Bavarian Research Institute of Experimental Geochemistry and Geophysics in 2012.

== Research ==
Frost's work combines geochemistry and geophysics to investigate structures and processes deep in Earth's interior, notably its mantle. His research uses high-pressure and high-temperature experiments on mineral, rock, and magma properties, and also involves measuring the velocities of seismic waves to determine the chemical composition of Earth's deepest and most inaccessible layers.

In 2019, a team of Bayreuth scientists, including Daniel Frost and Catherine McCammon, used high-pressure experiments to understand how carbon dioxide, water, and other oxygen-containing compounds escaped from Earth's mantle to form its atmosphere, so making the planet habitable.

In popular science news, Frost has been referred to as a scientist who makes diamonds from peanut butter – a reference to his high-pressure rock-crushing experiments that mimic the conditions of Earth's lower mantle.

== Awards ==
Frost's scientific awards include the MSA award of the Mineralogical Society of America (2006), the James B. Macelwane Medal of the American Geophysical Union (2006), the Arnold Sommerfeld Prize awarded by the Bavarian Academy of Sciences (2011) and the Gottfried Wilhelm Leibniz Prize of the German Research Council (2016). He was elected a Fellow of the European Association of Geochemistry in 2018 and a Fellow of the Royal Society in 2020.

== Selected publications ==
- Frost, Daniel J.; McCammon, Catherine A. (1 May 2008). "The Redox State of Earth's Mantle". Annual Review of Earth and Planetary Sciences. 36 (1): 389–420. Bibcode:2008AREPS..36..389F. doi:10.1146/annurev.earth.36.031207.124322. eISSN 1545-4495. ISSN 0084-6597.
- Frost, Daniel J.; Liebske, Christian; Langenhorst, Falko; McCammon, Catherine A.; Trønnes, Reidar G.; Rubie, David C. (25 March 2004). "Experimental evidence for the existence of iron-rich metal in the Earth's lower mantle". Nature. 428 (6981): 409–412. Bibcode:2004Natur.428..409F. doi:10.1038/nature02413. eISSN 1476-4679. ISSN 0028-0836. PMID 15042086. S2CID 32948214.
- Stagno, Vincenzo; Ojwang, Dickson O.; McCammon, Catherine A.; Frost, Daniel J. (January 2013). "The oxidation state of the mantle and the extraction of carbon from Earth's interior". Nature. 493 (7430): 84–88. Bibcode:2013Natur.493...84S. doi:10.1038/nature11679. eISSN 1476-4687. ISSN 0028-0836. PMID 23282365. S2CID 4329178.

== See also ==
- Mantle oxidation state
