= Catherine McCammon =

American geologist

Catherine Ann McCammon
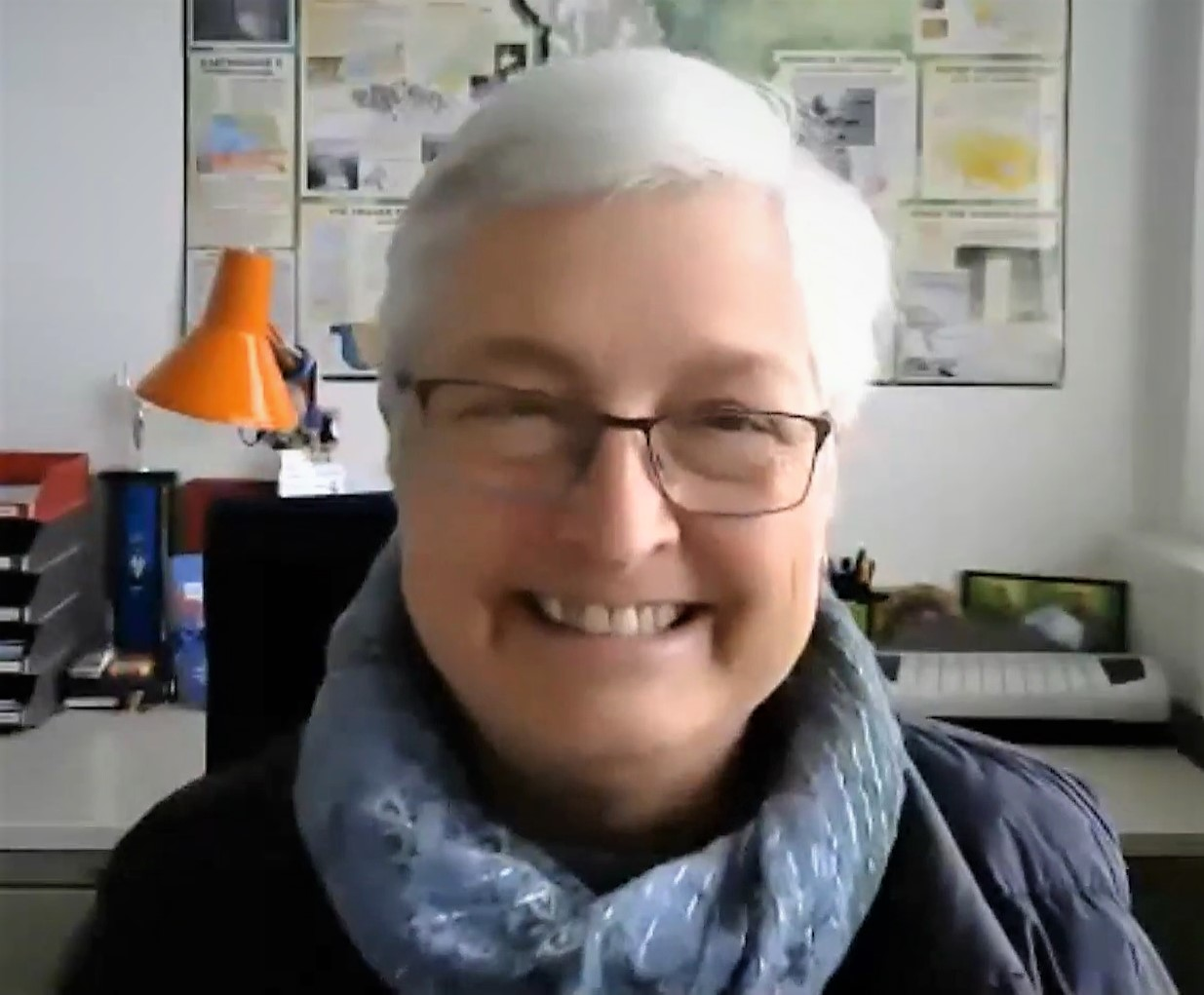
- McCammon in 2020
- Education: Australian National University; Massachusetts Institute of Technology
- Scientific career
- Workplaces: University of Bayreuth; University of British Columbia; University of Manitoba
- Thesis: Aspects of the high-pressure behaviour of iron oxides and sulphides (1983)

Catherine Ann McCammon (born August 13, 1957) is a Canadian geoscientist who is employed by the University of Bayreuth. Her research focuses on surface and mantle processes, as well as the physics and chemistry of minerals. She is a Fellow of the European Association of Geochemistry and American Geophysical Union. In 2013, she was awarded the European Geosciences Union Robert Wilhelm Bunsen medal. She is the editor of the journal Physics and Chemistry of Minerals.

== Early life and education ==
McCammon attended the Massachusetts Institute of Technology (MIT) for her undergraduate studies, where she majored in physics. She joined the American Geophysical Union as a member in 1978. She earned her doctorate at the Australian National University, where she studied the behaviour of iron oxides and sulphides. McCammon was a postdoctoral fellow with Natural Sciences and Engineering Research Council (NSERC) at the University of Manitoba.

== Research and career ==
In 1985, McCammon moved to the University of British Columbia, first as a postdoctoral scholar and then as an assistant professor. She left Canada for the University of Bayreuth in 1990, where she was appointed to a permanent position in 1996. McCammon studies Earth materials using advanced spectroscopic techniques. In particular, McCammon makes use of X-ray emission, X-ray absorption and Mössbauer spectroscopy. She developed the Mössbauer milliprobe, which allows measurements of the Mössbauer spectra of objects with diameters below 500 μm. The milliprobe allows the characterisation of minerals in high-pressure environments as well as at various interfaces.

McCammon has investigated the characteristics of iron in high-pressure materials, measuring their oxidation states and spin transitions. Better understanding of the oxidation states of iron in deep regions of Earth's interior not only allows for accurate modelling of the formation of the core, but also provides insight into the planet's geochemical evolution. High pressure experimentation has helped McCammon to understand the cycling of oxygen on planet Earth and the effect of iron on mantle discontinuities and the conductivity of minerals. She is the editor of the journal Physics and Chemistry of Minerals.

== Awards and honors ==
- 2001 Mineralogical Society of America Distinguished Lecturer
- 2002 Elected Fellow of the Mineralogical Society of America
- 2007 Elected Fellow of the European Association of Geochemistry
- 2007 Elected Fellow of the American Geophysical Union
- 2013 European Geosciences Union Robert Wilhelm Bunsen Medal
- 2017 International Board on the Applications of the Mössbauer Effect (IBAME) Science Award
- 2023 Harry H. Hess Medal of the American Geophysical Union

== Selected publications ==
- Daniel J. Frost; Catherine A. McCammon (May 2008). "The Redox State of Earth's Mantle". Annual Review of Earth and Planetary Sciences. 36 (1): 389–420. Bibcode:2008AREPS..36..389F. doi:10.1146/annurev.earth.36.031207.124322. ISSN 1545-4495. S2CID 131107147. Wikidata Q61714378.
- Daniel J. Frost; Christian Liebske; Falko Langenhorst; Catherine A McCammon; Reidar G Trønnes; David C Rubie (1 March 2004). "Experimental evidence for the existence of iron-rich metal in the Earth's lower mantle". Nature. 428 (6981): 409–412. Bibcode:2004Natur.428..409F. doi:10.1038/nature02413. ISSN 1476-4687. PMID 15042086. S2CID 32948214. Wikidata Q79820762.
- Vincenzo Stagno; Dickson O. Ojwang; Catherine A McCammon; Daniel J. Frost (1 January 2013). "The oxidation state of the mantle and the extraction of carbon from Earth's interior". Nature. 493 (7430): 84–88. Bibcode:2013Natur.493...84S. doi:10.1038/nature11679. ISSN 1476-4687. PMID 23282365. S2CID 4329178. Wikidata Q43529081.
