= Mantle oxidation state =

Application of oxidation state to the study of the Earth's mantle

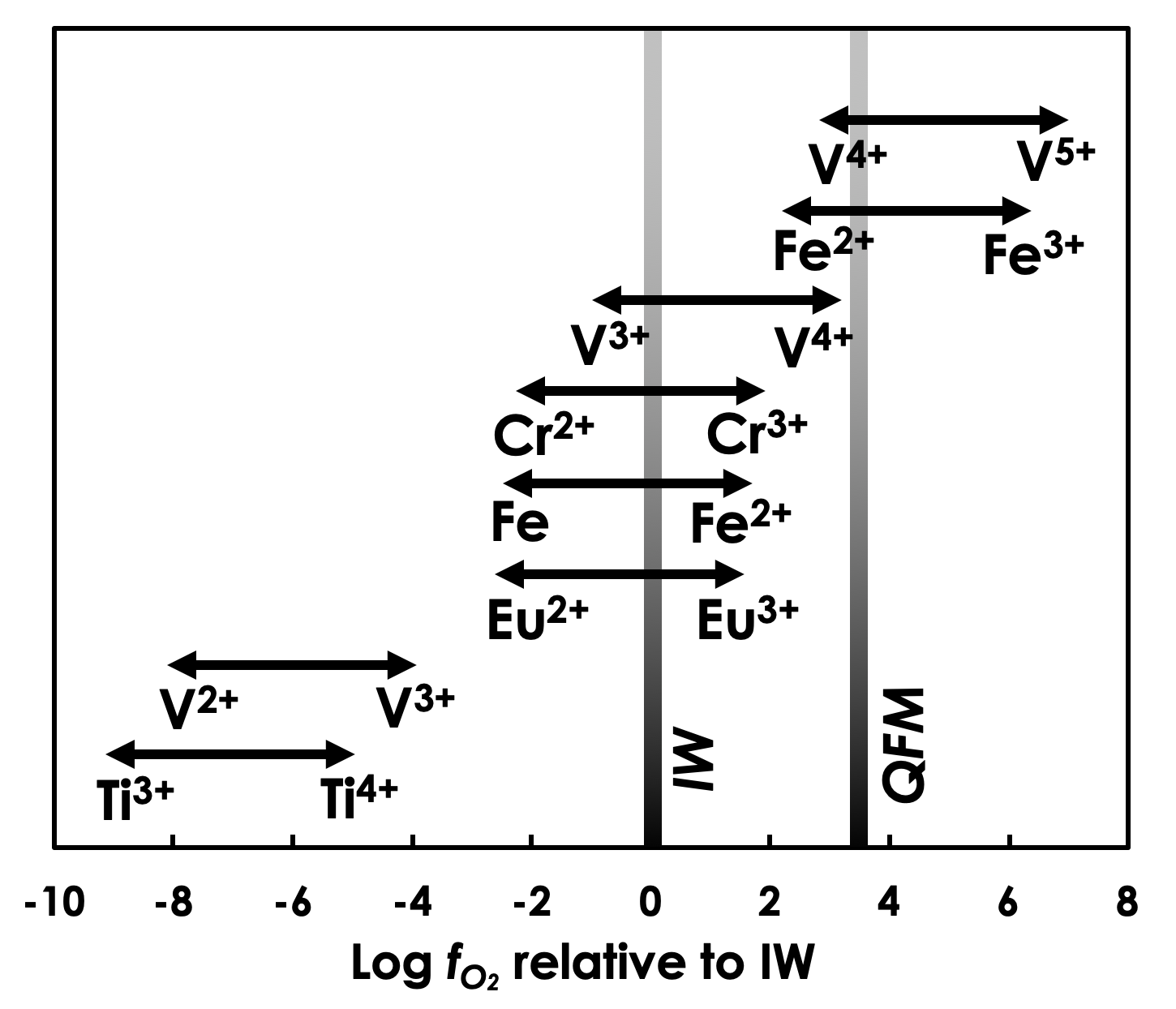
Oxygen fugacity range where common cation pairs dominate. Data for plotting are from Shearer et al., (2006). IW represents iron-Wüstite buffer and QFM represents quartz-fayalite-magnetite buffer.

Mantle oxidation state (redox state) applies the concept of oxidation state in chemistry to the study of the Earth's mantle. The chemical concept of oxidation state mainly refers to the valence state of one element, while mantle oxidation state provides the degree of decreasing or increasing valence states of all polyvalent elements in mantle materials confined in a closed system. The mantle oxidation state is controlled by oxygen fugacity and can be benchmarked by specific groups of redox buffers.

Mantle oxidation state changes because of the existence of polyvalent elements (elements with more than one valence state, e.g. Fe, Cr, V, Ti, Ce, Eu, C and others). Among them, Fe is the most abundant (≈8 wt% of the mantle) and its oxidation state largely reflects the oxidation state of mantle. Examining the valence state of other polyvalent elements could also provide the information of mantle oxidation state.

It is well known that the oxidation state can influence the partitioning behavior of elements and liquid water between melts and minerals, the speciation of C-O-H-bearing fluids and melts, as well as transport properties like electrical conductivity and creep.

The formation of diamond requires both reaching high pressures and high temperatures and a carbon source. The most common carbon source in the Earth's lower mantle is not elemental carbon, hence redox reactions need to be involved in diamond formation. Examining the oxidation state aids in predicting the P-T conditions of diamond formation and can elucidate the origin of deep diamonds.

== Thermodynamic description of oxidation state ==
Mantle oxidation state can be quantified as the oxygen fugacity ($fO_2$) of the system within the framework of thermodynamics. A higher oxygen fugacity implies a more oxygen-rich and more oxidized environment. At each given pressure-temperature conditions, for any compound or element M that bears the potential to be oxidized by oxygen

$M+\frac{x}{2}O_2\rightleftharpoons MO_x$

For example, if M is Fe, the redox equilibrium reaction can be Fe+1/2O_{2}=FeO; if M is FeO, the redox equilibrium reaction can be 2FeO+1/2O_{2}=Fe_{2}O_{3}.

Gibbs energy change associated with this reaction is therefore

$\Delta G= G(MO_x)-G(M)=\frac{x}{2}RT lnfO_2$

Along each isotherm, the partial derivation of ΔG with respect to P is ΔV,

$\frac{\partial \Delta G}{\partial P_{|T}}={\Delta V}$.

Combining the 2 equations above,

$\frac{\partial (lnfO_2))}{\partial P|_T}=\frac{2}{xRT}\Delta V$.

Therefore,

$logfO_2(P)=logfO_2(1bar)+(\frac{0.8686}{RT})\int_{1bar}^{P} \Delta VdP$ (note that ln(e as the base) changed to log(10 as the base) in this formula.

For a closed system, there might exist more than one of these equilibrium oxidation reactions, but since all these reactions share a same $fO_2$, examining one of them would allow extraction of oxidation state of the system.

== Pressure effect on oxygen fugacity ==
The physics and chemistry of mantle largely depend on pressure. As mantle minerals are compressed, they are transformed into other minerals at certain depths. Seismic observations of velocity discontinuities and experimental simulations on phase boundaries both verified the structure transformations within the mantle. As such, the mantle can be further divided into three layers with distinct mineral compositions.

Mantle Mineral Composition
| Mantle Layer | Depth | Pressure | Major Minerals |
|---|---|---|---|
| Upper Mantle | ≈10–410 km | ≈1-13 GPa | Olivine, Orthopyroxene, Clinopyroxene, Garnet |
| Transition Zone | 410–660 km | 13-23 GPa | Wadsleyite, Ringwoodite, Majoritic Garnet |
| Lower Mantle | 660–2891 km | 23-129 GPa | Ferropericlase, Bridgmanite, Ca-perovskite |

Since mantle mineral composition changes, the mineral hosting environment for polyvalent elements also alters. For each layer, the mineral combination governing the redox reactions is unique and will be discussed in detailed below.

=== Upper mantle ===
Between depths of 30 and 60 km, oxygen fugacity is mainly controlled by Olivine-Orthopyroxene-Spinel oxidation reaction.

$6Fe_2SiO_4+O_2\rightleftharpoons3Fe_2Si_2O_6+2Fe_3O_4$

Under deeper upper mantle conditions, Olivine-Orthopyroxene-Garnet oxygen barometer is the redox reaction that is used to calibrate oxygen fugacity.
$4Fe_2SiO_4+2FeSiO_3+O_2\rightleftharpoons2Fe_3^{2+}Fe_2^{3+}Si_3O_{12}$

In this reaction, 4 mole of ferrous ions were oxidized to ferric ions and the other 2 mole of ferrous ions remain unchanged.

=== Transition zone ===
Garnet-Garnet reaction can be used to estimate the redox state of transition zone.

$2Ca_3Al_2Si_3O_{12}+\frac{4}{3}Fe_3Al_2Si_3O_{12}+2.5Mg_4Si_4O_{12}+O_2 \rightleftharpoons2Ca_3Fe_2Si_3O_{12}+\frac{10}{3}Mg_3Al_2Si_3O_{12}+SiO_2$

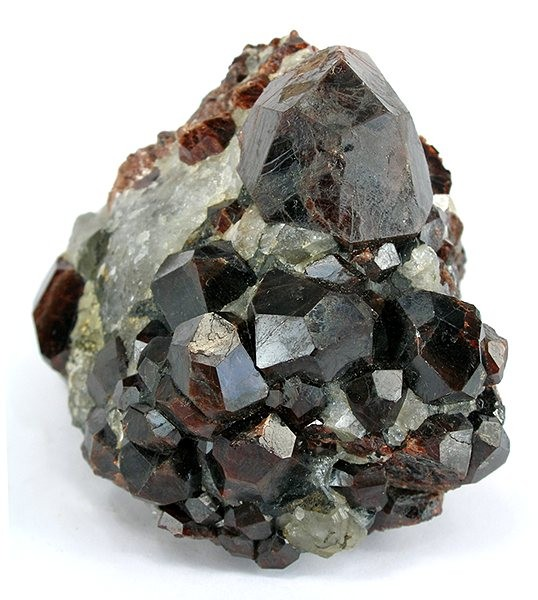
Garnet, a major mineral in the transition zone, controls the oxidation state there.

A recent study showed that the oxygen fugacity of transition referred from Garnet-Garnet reaction is -0.26 $logfO_2$ to +3 $logfO_2$ relative to the Fe-FeO (IW, iron- wütstite) oxygen buffer.

=== Lower mantle ===
Disproportionation of ferrous iron at lower mantle conditions also affect the mantle oxidation state. This reaction is different from the reactions mentioned above as it does not incorporate the participation of free oxygen.

$3Fe^{2+}(Fp)\rightleftharpoons Fe+2Fe^{3+}(Bdg)$,

FeO resides in the form of ferropericlase (Fp) and Fe_{2}O_{3} resides in the form of bridgmanite (Bdg). There is no oxygen fugacity change associated with the reaction. However, as the reaction products differ in density significantly, the metallic iron phase could descend downwards to the Earth's core and get separated from the mantle. In this case, the mantle loses metallic iron and becomes more oxidized.

== Implications for diamond formation ==
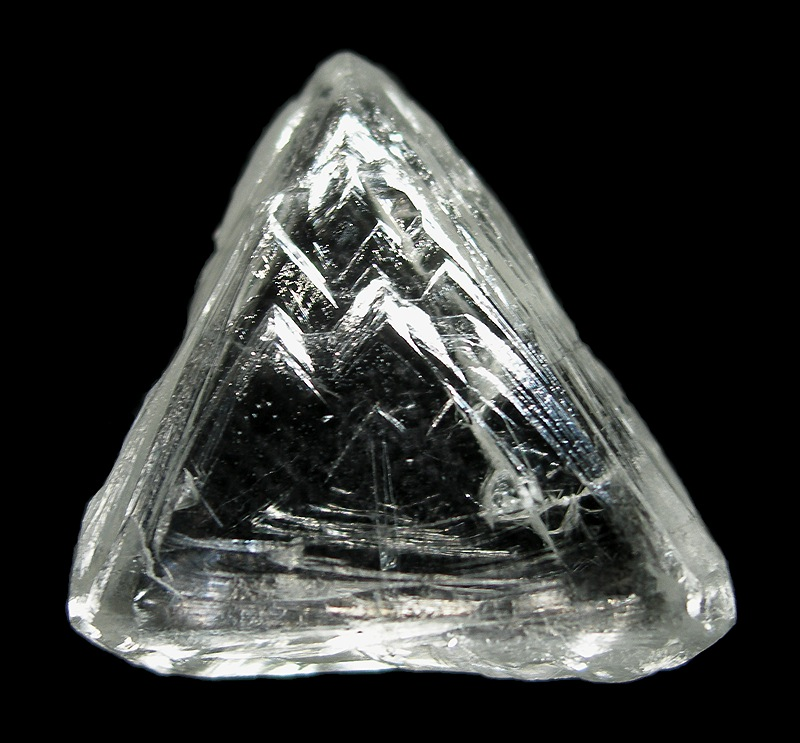
Diamond formed in the Earth's interior

The equilibrium reaction involving diamond is

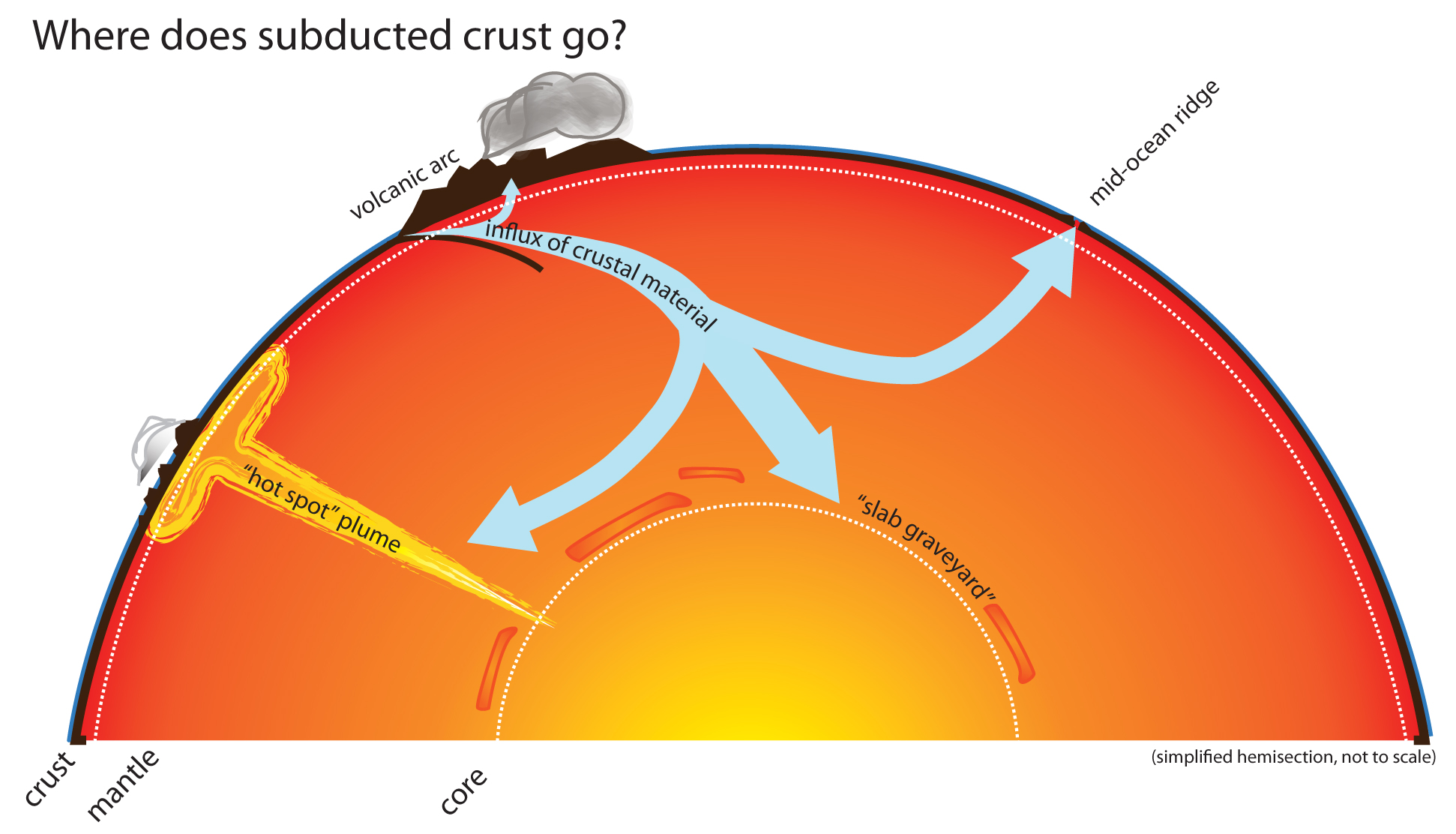
Carbon Cycle involving deep Earth

$Mg_2Si_2O_6+2MgCO_3\rightleftharpoons2Mg_2SiO_4+2C(Diamond)+2O_2$.

Examining the oxygen fugacity of the upper mantle and transition enables us to compare it with the conditions (equilibrium reaction shown above) required for diamond formation. The results show that the $logfO_2$ is usually 2 units lower than the carbonate-carbon reaction which means favoring the formation of diamond at transition zone conditions.

It has also been reported that pH decrease would also facilitate the formation of diamond in Mantle conditions.

$HCOO^{-}+H^++H_{2,aq} \rightleftharpoons C_{diamond}+2H_2O$

$CH_3CH_2COO^-+H^+\rightleftharpoons3C_{diamond}+H_{2,aq}+2H_2O$

where the subscript aq means 'aqueous', implying H_{2} is dissolved in the solution.

Deep diamonds have become important windows to look into the mineralogy of the Earth's interior. Minerals not stable at the surface could possibly be found within inclusions of superdeep diamonds—implying they were stable where these diamond crystallized. Because of the hardness of diamonds, the high pressure environment is retained even after transporting to the surface. So far, these superdeep minerals brought by diamonds include ringwoodite, ice-VII, cubic δ-N_{2} and Ca-perovskite.

== See also ==
- Ultra-high-pressure metamorphism
- Polymorphism (materials science)
- Table of thermodynamic equations
- List of oxidation states of the elements
