= Prime Minister's Questions =

UK parliamentary practice

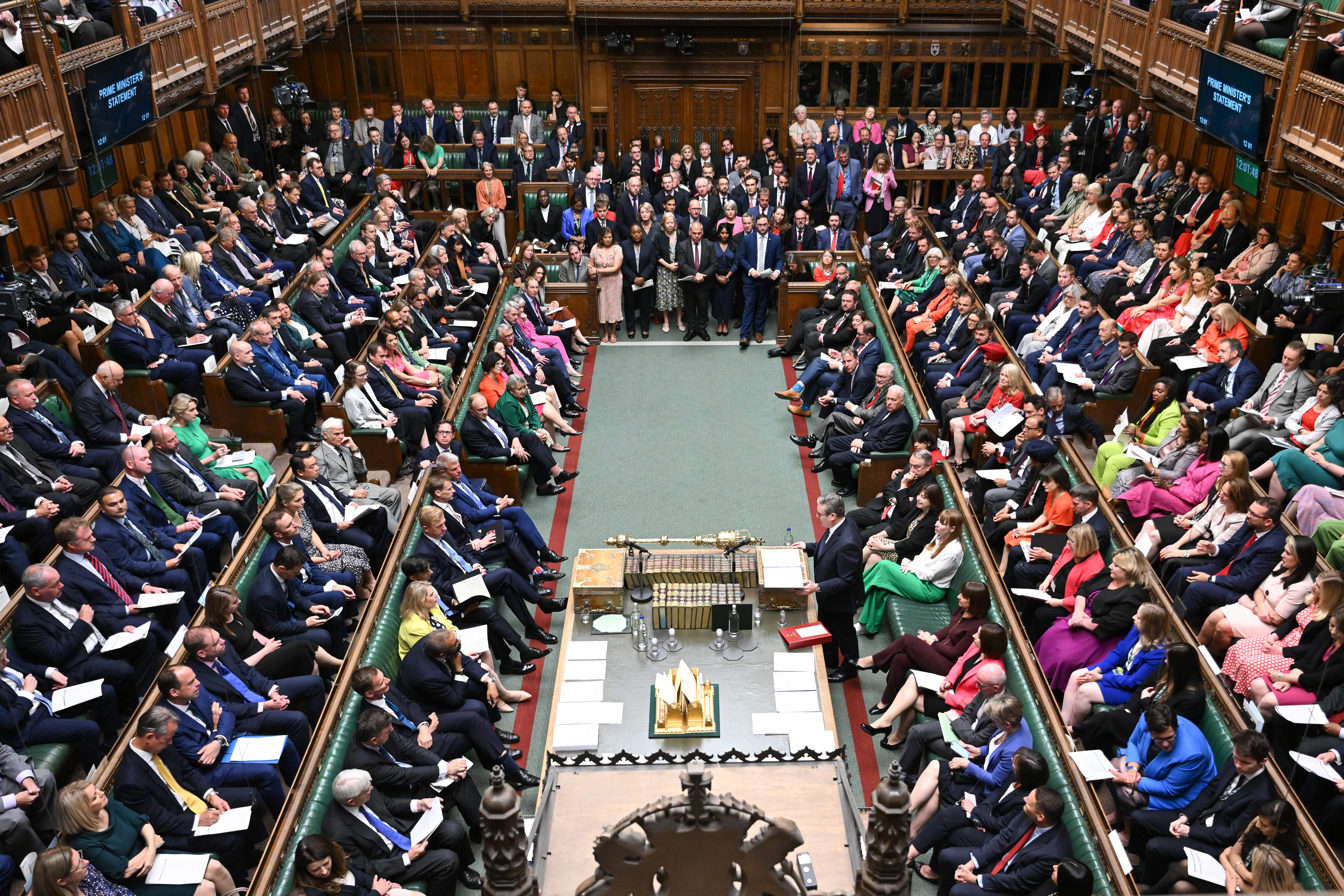
A wide shot of Prime Minister's Questions in 2024, showing the House of Commons packed with members

Prime Minister's Questions (PMQs, officially known as Questions to the Prime Minister, while colloquially known as Prime Minister's Question Time; when its the Deputy Prime Minister informally known as DPMQs or Questions to the Deputy Prime Minister, while colloquially known as Deputy Prime Minister's Question Time) is a constitutional convention in the United Kingdom, currently held as a single session every Wednesday at noon when the House of Commons is sitting, during which the prime minister answers questions from members of Parliament (MPs).

The Institute for Government has described PMQs as "the most distinctive and internationally famous feature of British politics." In the legislatures of the devolved nations of the UK, the equivalent procedure is known as First Minister's Questions.

== History ==
Although prime ministers have answered questions in parliament for centuries, until the 1880s, questions to the prime minister were treated the same as questions to other ministers of the Crown: asked without notice, on days when ministers were available, in whatever order MPs rose to ask them. In 1881 fixed time-limits for questions were introduced and questions to the prime minister were moved to the last slot of the day as a courtesy to the 72-year-old prime minister at the time, William Ewart Gladstone, so he could come to the Commons later in the day. In 1953, when Winston Churchill (in his late 70s at the time) was prime minister, it was agreed that questions would be submitted on fixed days (Tuesdays and Thursdays).

A Procedure Committee report in 1959 recommended that questions to the prime minister be taken in two fixed-period, 15-minute slots on Tuesday and Thursday afternoons. The recommendations were put into practice under Harold Macmillan during a successful experiment from 18 July 1961 to the end of the session on 4 August. The very first question was delivered by Labour MP Fenner Brockway, asking to which minister the UK ambassador to South Africa would be responsible. In response to the prime minister's answer, Brockway said "May I express our appreciation of this new arrangement for answering Questions and the hope that it will be convenient for the Prime Minister as well as useful to the House?" PMQs were made permanent in the following parliamentary session, with the first of these on 24 October 1961.

The style and culture of PMQs has changed gradually over time. According to former Speaker Selwyn Lloyd, the now famous disorderly behaviour of MPs during PMQs first arose as a result of the personal animosity between Harold Wilson and Edward Heath; before this PMQs had been lively but comparatively civilised. In the past, prime ministers often opted to transfer questions to the relevant minister, and leaders of the opposition did not always take their allocated number of questions in some sessions, sometimes opting not to ask any questions at all. This changed during the premiership of Margaret Thatcher, when the prime minister chose not to transfer any questions to other members of her Cabinet, and Labour leader Neil Kinnock began asking more questions than his predecessors. His successor, John Smith, established the precedent of always taking his full allocation of questions.

One of Tony Blair's first acts as prime minister was to replace the two 15-minute sessions with a single 30-minute session on Wednesdays, initially at 3 p.m. but since 2003 at noon. The allocated number of questions in each session for the leader of the opposition was doubled from three to six, and the leader of the third-largest party in the Commons was given two questions as opposed to one question beforehand. The first PMQs to use this new format took place on 21 May 1997.

"Question One" asks the prime minister to list their engagements, at this point also the PM reads the names of any police, military or former MPs and Peers who have died since he/she last addressed the house and send messages of congratulations or support ahead of major events.

The leader of the opposition and other leaders start their questions by saying "May I add my condolence and / or support to the remarks of the prime minister..."

During the Conservative-Liberal Democrat coalition government from 2010 to 2015, Nick Clegg, the leader of the Liberal Democrats, as a member of the government, did not ask questions during PMQs. Instead, the leader of the second largest parliamentary opposition party at the time, Nigel Dodds of the Democratic Unionist Party (DUP), usually asked a single question later in the session, followed by at least one MP from another party such as the Scottish National Party or Plaid Cymru.

== Practice ==
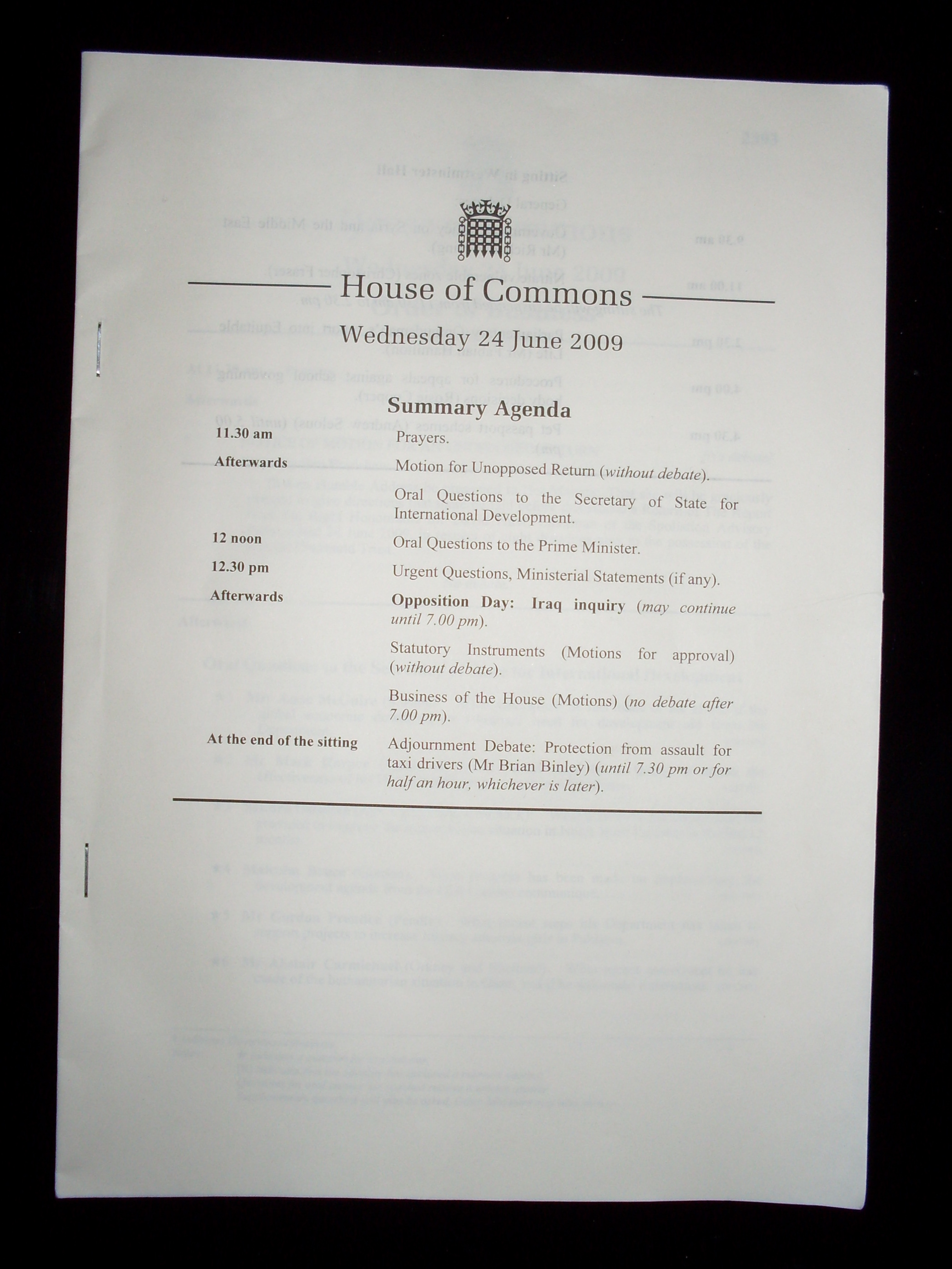
The Order Paper for Wednesday, 24 June 2009

Backbench MPs wishing to ask a question must enter their names on the Order Paper. The names of entrants are then shuffled in a ballot to produce a random order in which they will be called by the speaker. The speaker will then call on MPs to put their questions, usually in an alternating fashion: one MP from the government benches is followed by one from the opposition benches. MPs who are not selected may be chosen to ask a supplementary question if they "catch the eye" of the speaker, which is done by standing and sitting immediately before the prime minister gives an answer.

The leader of the opposition may ask six questions at PMQs, to be asked at their discretion, either as a whole block or separately. Most often, the six questions are asked consecutively. If the first question is asked by a government backbencher, the leader of the opposition is the second MP to ask questions. If the first question is asked by an opposition MP, this will be followed by a question from a government MP and then by the questions from the leader of the opposition. The leader of the second largest opposition parliamentary party (the Liberal Democrats as of 2024) would then ask two questions.

The first formal question on the Order Paper, posed by simply saying "number one, Mr [or Madam] Speaker", is usually to ask the prime minister "if he [she] will list his [her] engagements for the day". The prime minister usually replies:

This morning I had meetings with ministerial colleagues and others. In addition to my duties in this House, I shall have further such meetings later today.

In the prime minister's absence the deputy prime minister or First Secretary of State usually replies:

I have been asked to reply on behalf of my right honourable friend the Prime Minister who is [insert reason for PM's absence].

The reason for such a question is that, historically, the prime minister may be questioned only as to those matters that the prime minister is directly responsible for. Such matters are relatively few in number, because many substantive matters are handled by the other Cabinet ministers. By requiring the prime minister to list their engagements, the members may then inquire whether the prime minister ought to be engaged in some other activity or be taking some other action.

Before listing the day's engagements, the prime minister sometimes extends condolences or offers congratulations after significant events. During the Iraq War, Tony Blair introduced the practice of naming any British military personnel who had been killed in service since the last time he addressed the House. This practice was continued by Blair's successors as prime minister. After this, the MP may ask a supplementary question about any subject that might occupy the prime minister's time. Most MPs table, in this case meaning to introduce, the same engagements question and so after it has been asked for the first time, any other MPs who have tabled the same question are simply called to ask an untabled question, meaning that the prime minister will not know what questions will be asked.

Occasionally the first question tabled is on a specific area of policy, not the engagements question. This, though, is quite rare as it would allow the prime minister to prepare a response in advance; the non-descript question allows some chance of catching him or her out with an unexpected supplementary question.

At times of national or personal tragedy or crisis, PMQs have been temporarily suspended. The last such suspension occurred on 25 February 2009 when the speaker, at the request of Prime Minister Gordon Brown, suspended the Commons as a mark of respect following the unexpected death of Opposition leader David Cameron's son. Prime Minister's Questions was also suspended following the sudden death of the leader of the Labour Party, John Smith, in 1994.

PMQs has been filmed since 1989, and has been broadcast live since 1990. It is broadcast live in the United Kingdom on the BBC Two and BBC Parliament television channels. It is also broadcast outside the United Kingdom, most notably on the international pay television network BBC World News and the US cable network C-SPAN.

=== Absence of the prime minister or leader of the opposition ===
If the prime minister is away on official business when PMQs is scheduled, the role is usually filled by the deputy prime minister or First Secretary of State. If these offices are not occupied or the deputy prime minister is not available, the next most senior member of the Cabinet will receive questions (such as the first secretary of state or the deputy leader of the government party). In the absence of the leader of the opposition, the opposition questions will be usually led by the next highest-ranking member of the Shadow Cabinet. From 1992 to 2020, a convention was in place that if either the prime minister or the leader of the opposition is absent, the other faction would nominate someone to stand, meaning that both sides were stood in for. This precedent was broken at Keir Starmer's first PMQs as leader of the opposition, as Prime Minister Boris Johnson was hospitalised due to illness with COVID-19. Dominic Raab, as first secretary of state, stood in for Johnson. On 16 September 2020, a member of Starmer's household displayed COVID-19 symptoms, meaning he was self-isolating. As a result, Deputy Leader of the Labour Party and Shadow First Secretary of State Angela Rayner stood in for him putting questions to Johnson. Before 1992, the replacement would often question the prime minister or vice versa. For example, Roy Hattersley, the deputy leader of the Labour Party between 1983 and 1992, stood in for Neil Kinnock facing Margaret Thatcher on 38 occasions between February 1984 and July 1990.

Boris Johnson also became the first prime minister to answer PMQs outside the chamber virtually after having been told to isolate after meeting with Lee Anderson who later tested positive for COVID-19. Keir Starmer became the first leader of the opposition to ask questions remotely a month later after a member of his office staff contracted COVID-19.

During the Cameron–Clegg coalition, Nick Clegg answered 15 PMQs and William Hague twice, all opposite Harriet Harman. Clegg also took Deputy Prime Ministers Questions on a Tuesday once a month facing Harman. (Note: 20 June 2012 and 10 September 2014) Harman had previously in her capacity as the deputy leader of the Labour Party and de facto deputy prime minister, answered PMQs for Gordon Brown on 10 occasions between April 2008 and March 2010, all opposite William Hague. During the Second Cameron ministry, George Osborne answered three times, opposite Hilary Benn and Angela Eagle. (Note: 17 June 2015, 9 December 2015 and 25 May 2016) In the Second May ministry, Damian Green replied twice, (Note: 12 July 2017 and 29 November 2017) opposite Emily Thornberry, while David Lidington did so six times, opposite Thornberry and Rebecca Long-Bailey. (Note: 7 December 2016, 31 January 2018, 11 July 2018, 6 February 2019, 24 April 2019 and 5 June 2019) On 2 October 2019, Diane Abbott became the first black MP to stand for PMQs and ask the six main questions when she challenged the foreign secretary, Dominic Raab, in his capacity as first secretary of state. Conservative Deputy Prime Minister Thérèse Coffey never stood in for the PM at the dispatch box for Liz Truss. Raab and Oliver Dowden represented Rishi Sunak during their terms as DPM.

Under Keir Starmer's premiership, he was represented by his DPMs, Angela Rayner and David Lammy. As their opposite, Kemi Badenoch has deputised Alex Burghart, Mel Stride, Chris Philp, Andrew Griffith, Claire Coutinho and James Cleverly.

== Leaders at the despatch box since 1961 ==
The most high-profile contributors at Prime Minister's Questions are the prime minister and the leader of the opposition, who speak opposite each other at the despatch box. Regular, fixed sessions have taken place since 1961, and the list below outlines the prime ministers since 1961 and opposition party leaders they faced across the floor of the House of Commons, as well as the secondary opposition leader since (usually the leader of third largest party within the House of Commons):

Party key	Conservative	Liberal Democrats
Party key	Labour	Scottish National Party

Prime Minister	Leader of the Opposition	Secondary Opposition Leader	Years
Harold Macmillan	Hugh Gaitskell	None	1961–1963
Harold Macmillan	George Brown	None	1963
Harold Macmillan	Harold Wilson	None	1963
Alec Douglas-Home	Harold Wilson	None	1963–1964
Harold Wilson	Alec Douglas-Home	None	1964–1965
Harold Wilson	Edward Heath	None	1965–1970
Edward Heath	Harold Wilson	None	1970–1974
Harold Wilson	Edward Heath	None	1974–1975
Harold Wilson	Margaret Thatcher	None	1975–1976
James Callaghan	Margaret Thatcher	None	1976–1979
Margaret Thatcher	James Callaghan	None	1979–1980
Margaret Thatcher	Michael Foot	None	1980–1983
Margaret Thatcher	Neil Kinnock	None	1983–1990
John Major	Neil Kinnock	None	1990–1992
John Major	John Smith	None	1992–1994
John Major	Margaret Beckett	None	1994
John Major	Tony Blair	None	1994–1997
Tony Blair	John Major	Paddy Ashdown	1997
Tony Blair	William Hague	Paddy Ashdown	1997–1999
Tony Blair	William Hague	Charles Kennedy	1999–2001
Tony Blair	Iain Duncan Smith	Charles Kennedy	2001–2003
Tony Blair	Michael Howard	Charles Kennedy	2003–2005
Tony Blair	David Cameron	Charles Kennedy	2005–2006
Tony Blair	David Cameron	Menzies Campbell	2006–2007
Gordon Brown	David Cameron	Menzies Campbell	2007
Gordon Brown	David Cameron	Vince Cable	2007
Gordon Brown	David Cameron	Nick Clegg	2007–2010
David Cameron	Harriet Harman	None	2010
David Cameron	Ed Miliband	None	2010–2015
David Cameron	Harriet Harman	Angus Robertson	2015
David Cameron	Jeremy Corbyn	Angus Robertson	2015–2016
Theresa May	Jeremy Corbyn	Angus Robertson	2016–2017
Theresa May	Jeremy Corbyn	Ian Blackford	2017–2019
Boris Johnson	Jeremy Corbyn	Ian Blackford	2019–2020
Boris Johnson	Keir Starmer	Ian Blackford	2020–2022
Liz Truss	Keir Starmer	Ian Blackford	2022
Rishi Sunak	Keir Starmer	Ian Blackford	2022
Rishi Sunak	Keir Starmer	Stephen Flynn	2022–2024
Keir Starmer	Rishi Sunak	Ed Davey	2024
Keir Starmer	Kemi Badenoch	Ed Davey	2024–2026
Andy Burnham	Kemi Badenoch	Ed Davey	2026–

== Media coverage ==
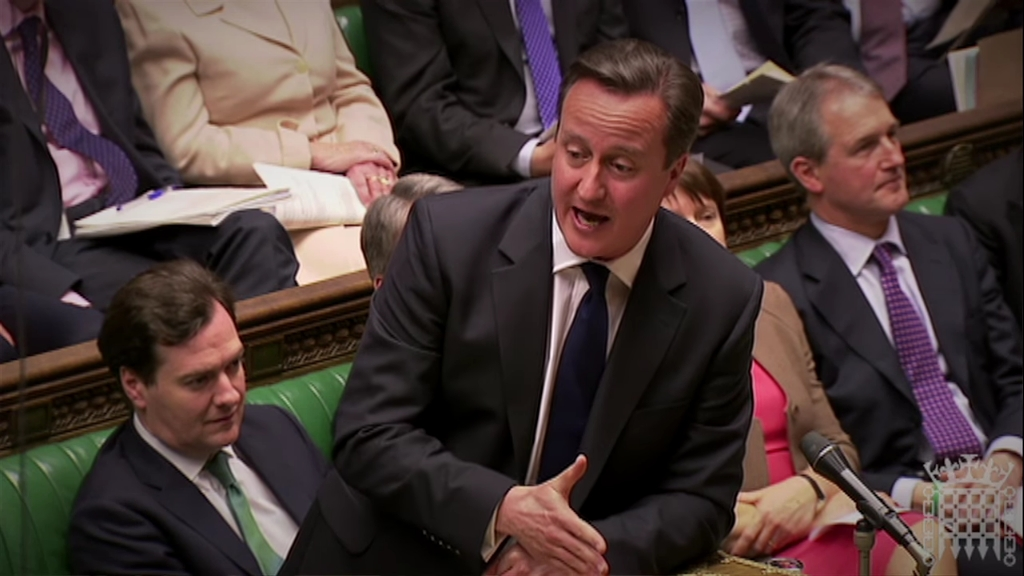
Broadcast of David Cameron answering Prime Minister's Questions in 2012

In the United Kingdom, Prime Minister's Questions is broadcast live via cameras within the Press gallery inside the House of Commons on domestic national television channels BBC Two, the BBC News Channel, BBC Parliament, Sky News and GB News. It is also broadcast live on the national radio station BBC Radio 5 Live.

In the United States, Prime Minister's Questions is broadcast live on the national C-SPAN television network. C-SPAN also has an archive of Prime Minister's Questions coverage going back to 1989 when it was first televised. There is no live radio coverage of Prime Minister's Questions in that country.

Prime Minister's Questions has been spoofed on the American late-night television sketch comedy Saturday Night Live.

In a C-SPAN interview in 1991, shortly after the network started to broadcast Prime Minister's Questions, then US president George H. W. Bush said, "I count my blessings for the fact I don't have to go into that pit that John Major stands in, nose-to-nose with the opposition, all yelling at each other."

Worldwide, Prime Minister's Questions is broadcast live via the official British Parliament website parliamentlive.tv, in visual and audio form.
