= First Minister's Questions =

Parliamentary accountability mechanism

First Minister's Questions are question time sessions held respectively in the Northern Ireland Assembly, the Scottish Parliament and the Senedd. First Minister's Questions is an opportunity for members of each legislature to question the respective leaders of the devolved nations of the United Kingdom. These sessions are based on the similar Prime Minister's Questions held in the House of Commons. It is usually the most attended event in each legislature by representatives.

== Northern Ireland Assembly ==
In Northern Ireland, Questions to the Executive Office or Executive Office Questions (previously Questions to the Office of the First Minister and deputy First Minister, or simply First Minister's Questions) is taken jointly by the First Minister and Deputy First Minister. This joint approach is part of the power-sharing arrangements that underpin the operation of the Northern Ireland Assembly and Executive Office. Members of the Legislative Assembly (MLAs) may put questions to the ministers for up to thirty minutes. The questions are tabled in advance by MLAs.

== Scottish Parliament ==
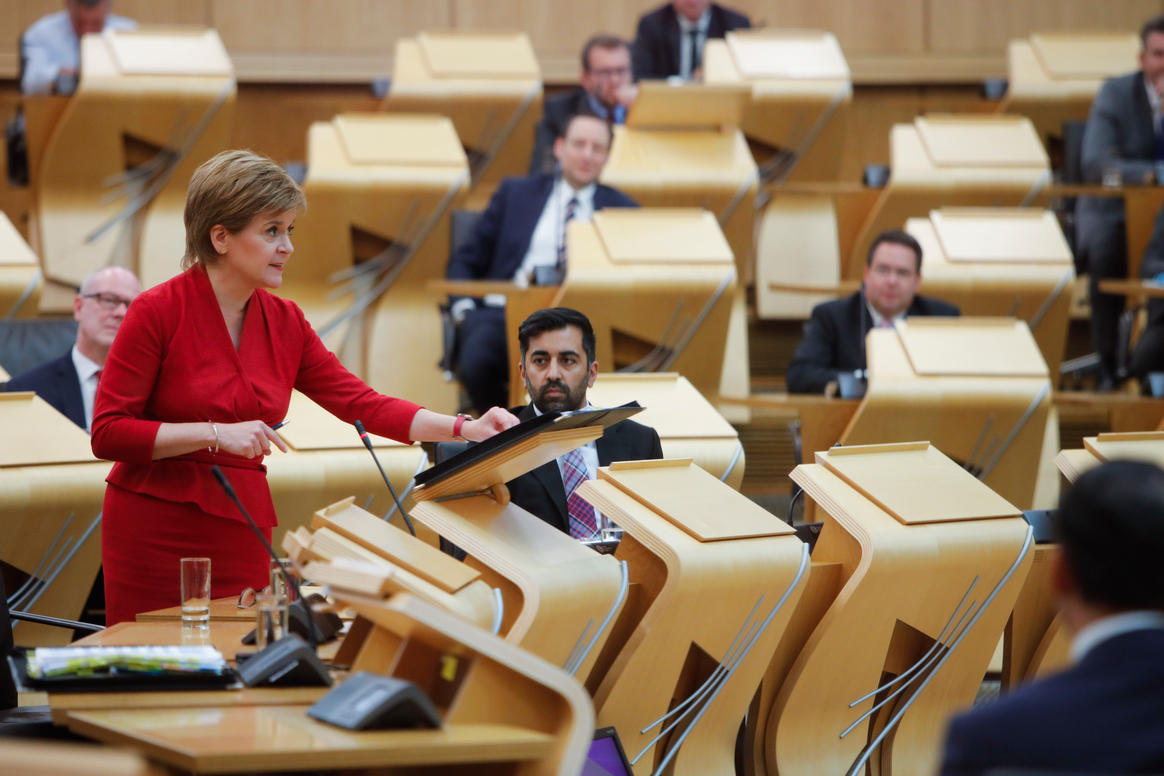
First Minister Nicola Sturgeon speaking during First Minister's Questions, September 2021

In Scotland, First Minister's Questions (often abbreviated to FMQs) is a weekly question time session held when the Scottish Parliament is sitting, during which Members of the Scottish Parliament (MSPs) may question the First Minister. FMQs are held every Thursday at noon and typically last for forty-five minutes. The current format allows the leader of the largest opposition party to ask the First Minister several questions, with subsequent questions from each of the leaders of the second and third largest opposition political parties. Other MSPs present in the debating chamber may ask a single question, at the discretion of the Presiding Officer.

== Senedd ==
In Wales, First Minister's Questions is a question time session held weekly in the Senedd that permits Members of the Senedd (MSs) up to forty-five minutes to question the First Minister on issues within the remit of the Welsh Government. The session was initially titled First Secretary's Questions, and was renamed when the position of First Secretary for Wales was renamed to First Minister in 2000.

== See also ==
- Devolution in the United Kingdom
- Prime Minister's Questions
- Question time
