= Physics and Chemistry of Minerals =

- Discipline: Mineralogy, mineral physics
- Language: English
- Edited by: M. Matsui, C. McCammon, M. Rieder, P.C. Burnley

Publication details
- Publisher: Springer Verlag (Germany)
- Frequency: Monthly
- Impact factor: 1.876 (2010)

Standard abbreviations
- ISO 4: Phys. Chem. Miner.

Indexing
- ISSN: 0342-1791 (print); 1432-2021 (web)

Links
- Journal homepage

Physics and Chemistry of Minerals is a peer-reviewed scientific journal published monthly by Springer Science+Business Media. The journal publishes articles and short communications on minerals or solids related to minerals and covers applications of modern techniques or new theories and models to interpret atomic structures and physical or chemical properties of minerals. Topics include: general solid state spectroscopy, experimental and theoretical analysis of chemical bonding in minerals, physical properties, fundamental properties of atomic structure, mineral surfaces.

== Impact factor ==
According to the Journal Citation Reports, the journal has a 2010 impact factor of 1.876 (announced in 2011).

== Editors ==
The Editors-in-Chief are C.A. McCammon (University of Bayreuth, Germany), M. Matsui, University of Hyogo, Japan), M. Rieder, (Praha, Czech Republic), and P. C. Burnley (University of Nevada, Las Vegas, Nevada, USA).
