= Wüstite =

Iron(II) oxide (FeO) mineral formed under reducing conditions

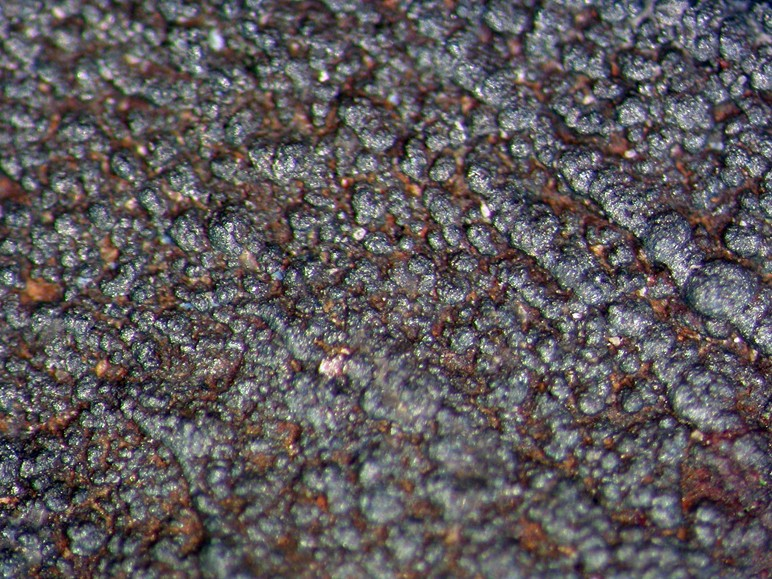

General
- Category: Oxide mineral
- Formula: FeO
- IMA symbol: Wüs
- Strunz classification: 4.AB.25
- Crystal system: Cubic
- Crystal class: Hexoctahedral (m3̅m); H–M symbol: (4/m 3̅ 2/m)
- Space group: Fm3m (no. 225)

Identification
- Color: Greyish white to yellow or brown; colorless in thin section
- Crystal habit: Pyramidic, prismatic
- Cleavage: {001} perfect
- Fracture: Subconchoidal to rough
- Mohs scale hardness: 5–5.5
- Specific gravity: 5.88
- Density: 5.7 g/cm^{3}
- Refractive index: 1.735–2.32 in synthetic crystals
- Pleochroism: None
- Solubility: Soluble in dilute HCl
- Other characteristics: Forms solid solution with periclase

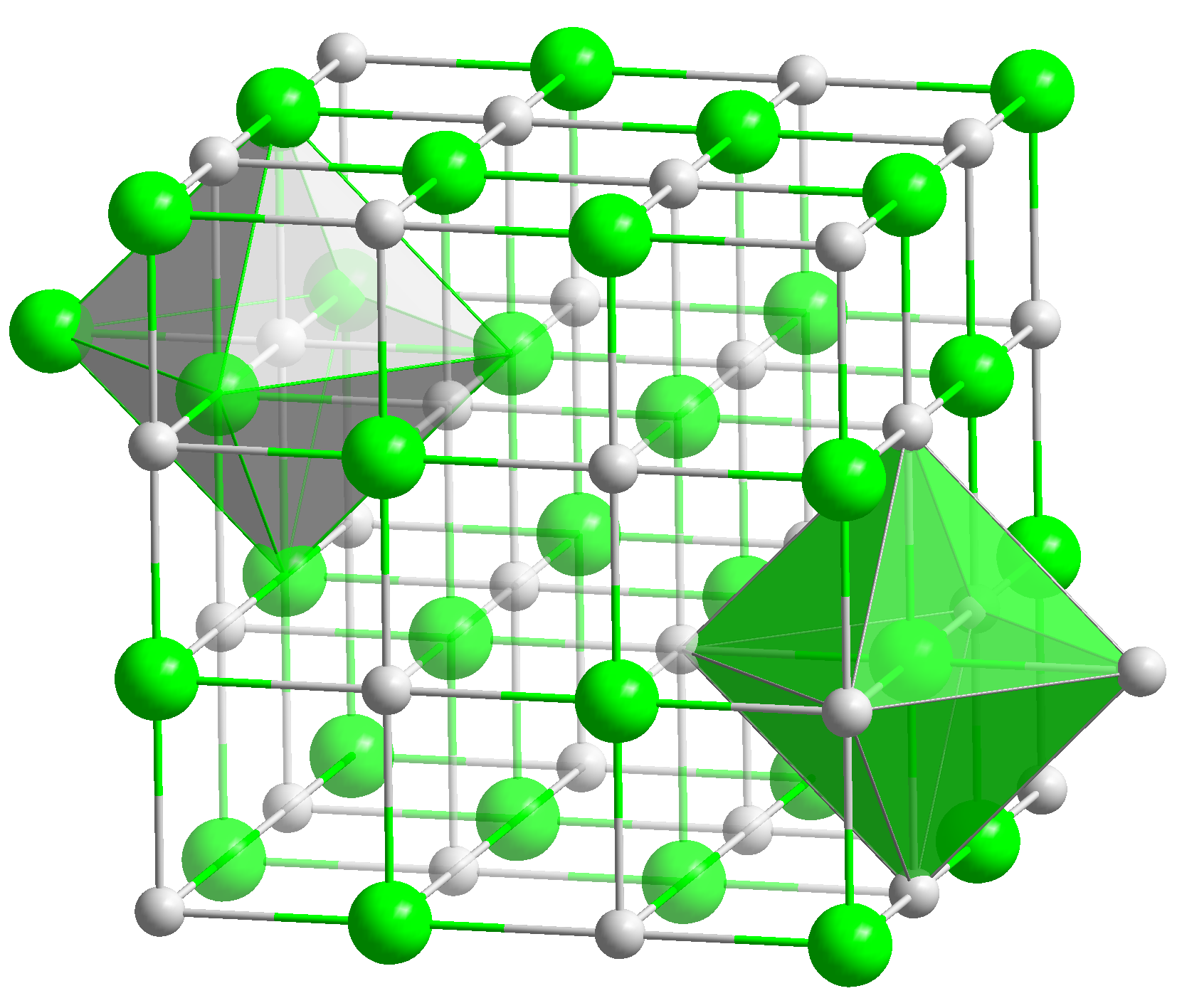
Crystal structure of Wüstite

Wüstite (FeO, sometimes also written as Fe_{0.95}O) is a mineral form of mostly iron(II) oxide found with meteorites and native iron. It has a grey colour with a greenish tint in reflected light. Wüstite crystallizes in the isometric-hexoctahedral crystal system in opaque to translucent metallic grains. It has a Mohs hardness of 5 to 5.5 and a specific gravity of 5.88. Wüstite is a typical example of a non-stoichiometric compound.

Wüstite was named after Fritz Wüst (1860–1938), a German metallurgist and founding director of the Kaiser-Wilhelm-Institut für Eisenforschung (presently Max Planck Institute for Iron Research GmbH).

In addition to its type locality in Germany, it has been reported from Disko Island, Greenland; the Jharia coalfield, Jharkhand, India; and as inclusions in diamonds in a number of kimberlite pipes. It also is reported from deep sea manganese nodules.

Its presence indicates a highly reducing environment.

== Wüstite redox buffer ==
Iron minerals on the Earth's surface are typically richly oxidized, forming hematite, with Fe^{3+} state, or in somewhat less oxidizing environments, magnetite, with a mixture of Fe^{3+} and Fe^{2+}. Wüstite, in geochemistry, defines a redox buffer of oxidation within rocks at which point the rock is so reduced that Fe^{3+}, and thus hematite, is absent.

As the redox state of a rock is further reduced, magnetite is converted to wüstite. This occurs by conversion of the Fe^{3+} ions in magnetite to Fe^{2+} ions. An example reaction is presented below:

$$\ce{\underset{magnetite}{FeO.Fe2O3} + \underset{graphite/diamond}{C} -> {3FeO} + \underset{carbon\ monoxide}{CO}}$$

The formula for magnetite is more accurately written as FeO·Fe_{2}O_{3} than as Fe_{3}O_{4}. Magnetite is one part FeO and one part Fe_{2}O_{3}, rather than a solid solution of wüstite and hematite. Magnetite is termed a redox buffer because, until all Fe^{3+} present in the system is converted to Fe^{2+}, the oxide mineral assemblage of iron remains wüstite-magnetite. Furthermore, the redox state of the rock remains at the same level of oxygen fugacity. Considering buffering the redox potential (E_{h}) in the Fe–O redox system, this can be compared to buffering the pH in the H^{+}/OH^{−} acid–base system of water.

Once the Fe^{3+} is consumed, then oxygen must be stripped from the system to further reduce it and wüstite is converted to native iron. The oxide mineral equilibrium assemblage of the rock becomes wüstite–magnetite–iron.

In nature, the only natural systems which are chemically reduced enough to even attain a wüstite–magnetite composition are rare, including carbonate-rich skarns, meteorites, fulgurites and lightning-affected rock, and perhaps the mantle where reduced carbon is present, exemplified by the presence of diamond or graphite.

=== Effects upon silicate minerals ===
The ratio of Fe^{2+} to Fe^{3+} within a rock determines, in part, the silicate mineral assemblage of the rock. Within a rock of a given chemical composition, iron enters minerals based on the bulk chemical composition and the mineral phases which are stable at that temperature and pressure. Iron may only enter minerals such as pyroxene and olivine if it is present as Fe^{2+}; Fe^{3+} cannot enter the lattice of fayalite olivine and thus for every two Fe^{3+} ions, one Fe^{2+} is used and one molecule of magnetite is created.

In chemically reduced rocks, magnetite may be absent due to the propensity of iron to enter olivine, and wüstite may only be present if there is an excess of iron above what can be used by silica. Thus, wüstite may only be found in silica-undersaturated compositions which are also heavily chemically reduced, satisfying both the need to remove all Fe^{3+} and to maintain iron outside of silicate minerals.

In nature, carbonate rocks, potentially carbonatite, kimberlites, carbonate-bearing melilitic rocks, and other rare alkaline rocks may satisfy these criteria. However, wüstite is not reported in most of these rocks in nature, potentially because the redox state necessary to drive magnetite to wüstite is so rare.

== Role in nitrogen fixation ==
Approximately 2–3% of the world's energy budget is allocated to the Haber process for ammonia (NH_{3}) production, which relies on wüstite-derived catalysts. The industrial catalyst is derived from finely ground iron powder, which is usually obtained by reduction of high-purity magnetite (Fe_{3}O_{4}). The pulverized iron metal is burnt (oxidized) to give magnetite or wüstite of a defined particle size. The magnetite (or wüstite) particles are then partially reduced, removing some of the oxygen in the process. The resulting catalyst particles consist of a core of magnetite, encased in a shell of wüstite, which in turn is surrounded by an outer shell of iron metal. The catalyst maintains most of its bulk volume during the reduction, resulting in a highly porous high-surface-area material, which enhances its effectiveness as a catalyst.

== Historical use ==
According to Vagn Fabritius Buchwald, wüstite was an important component during the Iron Age to facilitate the process of forge welding. In ancient times, when blacksmithing was performed using a charcoal forge, the deep charcoal pit in which the steel or iron was placed provided a highly reducing, virtually oxygen-free environment, producing a thin wüstite layer on the metal. At the welding temperature, the iron becomes highly reactive with oxygen, and will spark and form thick layers of slag when exposed to the air, which makes welding the iron or steel nearly impossible. To solve this problem, ancient blacksmiths would toss small amounts of sand onto the white-hot metal. The silica in the sand reacts with the wüstite to form fayalite, which melts just below the welding temperature. This produced an effective flux that shielded the metal from oxygen and helped extract oxides and impurities, leaving a pure surface that can weld readily. Although the ancients had no knowledge of how this worked, the ability to weld iron contributed to the movement out of the Bronze Age and into the modern.

== Related minerals ==
Wüstite forms a solid solution with periclase (MgO), and iron substitutes for magnesium. Periclase, when hydrated, forms brucite (Mg(OH)_{2}), a common product of serpentinite metamorphic reactions.

Oxidation and hydration of wüstite forms goethite and limonite.

Zinc, aluminium, and other metals may substitute for iron in wüstite.

Wüstite in dolomite skarns may be related to siderite (iron(II) carbonate), wollastonite, enstatite, diopside, and magnesite.

== See also ==
- Normative mineralogy
