= Mineral redox buffer =

Geochemical assemblage

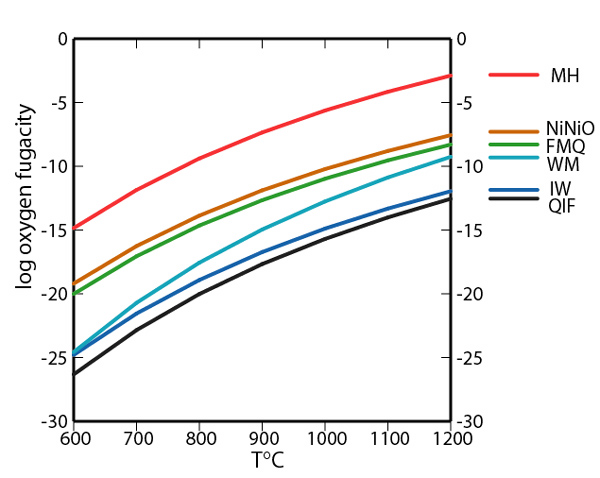
Fugacity-temperature diagram. Log oxygen fugacity vs temperature at 1 bar pressure for common buffer assemblages, plotted from algorithms compiled by B. R. Frost. (MH, magnetite-hematite; NiNiO, Nickel-nickel oxide; FMQ, fayalite-magnetite-quartz; WM, wustite-magnetite; IW, iron-wustite; QIF, quartz-iron-fayalite)

In geology, a redox buffer is an assemblage of minerals or compounds that constrains oxygen fugacity as a function of temperature. Knowledge of the redox conditions (or equivalently, oxygen fugacities) at which a rock forms and evolves can be important for interpreting the rock history. Iron, sulfur, and manganese are three of the relatively abundant elements in the Earth's crust that occur in more than one oxidation state. For instance, iron, the fourth most abundant element in the crust, exists as native iron, ferrous iron (Fe^{2+}), and ferric iron (Fe^{3+}). The redox state of a rock affects the relative proportions of the oxidation states of these elements and hence may determine both the minerals present and their compositions. If a rock contains pure minerals that constitute a redox buffer, then the oxygen fugacity of equilibration is defined by one of the curves in the accompanying fugacity-temperature diagram.

== Common redox buffers and mineralogy ==
Redox buffers were developed in part to control oxygen fugacities in laboratory experiments to investigate mineral stabilities and rock histories. Each of the curves plotted in the fugacity-temperature diagram is for an oxidation reaction occurring in a buffer. These redox buffers are listed here in order of decreasing oxygen fugacity at a given temperature—in other words, from more oxidizing to more reducing conditions in the plotted temperature range. As long as all the pure minerals (or compounds) are present in a buffer assemblage, the oxidizing conditions are fixed on the curve for that buffer. Pressure has only a minor influence on these buffer curves for conditions in the Earth's crust.

MH: magnetite-hematite:

4 Fe_{3}O_{4} + O_{2} ⇌ 6 Fe_{2}O_{3}

NiNiO: nickel-nickel oxide:

2 Ni + O_{2} ⇌ 2 NiO

FMQ: fayalite-magnetite-quartz:

3 Fe_{2}SiO_{4} + O_{2} ⇌ 2 Fe_{3}O_{4} + 3 SiO_{2}

WM: wüstite-magnetite:

3 Fe_{1−x}O + O_{2} ~ Fe_{3}O_{4}

IW: iron-wüstite:

2 (1-x) Fe + O_{2} ⇌ 2 Fe_{1−x}O

QIF: quartz-iron-fayalite:

2 Fe + SiO_{2} + O_{2} ⇌ Fe_{2}SiO_{4}

== Minerals, rock types, and characteristic buffers ==
=== Mineralogy and correlations with redox buffer ===
The ratio of Fe^{2+} to Fe^{3+} within a rock determines, in part, the silicate mineral and oxide mineral assemblage of the rock. Within a rock of a given chemical composition, iron enters minerals based on the bulk chemical composition and the mineral phases which are stable at that temperature and pressure. For instance, at redox conditions more oxidizing than the MH (magnetite-hematite) buffer, at least much of the iron is likely to be present as Fe^{3+} and hematite is a likely mineral in iron-bearing rocks. Iron may only enter minerals such as olivine if it is present as Fe^{2+}; Fe^{3+} cannot enter the lattice of fayalite olivine. Elements in olivine such as magnesium, however, stabilize olivine containing Fe^{2+} to conditions more oxidizing than those required for fayalite stability. Solid solution between magnetite and the titanium-bearing endmember, ulvospinel, enlarges the stability field of magnetite. Likewise, at conditions more reducing than the IW (iron-wustite) buffer, minerals such as pyroxene can still contain Fe^{3+}. The redox buffers therefore are only approximate guides to the proportions of Fe^{2+} and Fe^{3+} in minerals and rocks.

=== Igneous rocks ===
Terrestrial igneous rocks commonly record crystallization at oxygen fugacities more oxidizing than the WM (wüstite-magnetite) buffer and more reduced than a log unit or so above the nickel-nickel oxide (NiNiO) buffer. Their oxidizing conditions thus are not far from those of the FMQ (fayalite-magnetite-quartz) redox buffer. Nonetheless, there are systematic differences that correlate with tectonic setting. Igneous rock emplaced and erupted in island arcs typically record oxygen fugacities 1 or more log units more oxidizing than those of the NiNiO buffer. In contrast, basalt and gabbro in non-arc settings typically record oxygen fugacities from about those of the FMQ buffer to a log unit or so more reducing than that buffer.

=== Sedimentary rocks ===
Oxidizing conditions are common in some environments of deposition and diagenesis of sedimentary rocks. The fugacity of oxygen at the MH buffer (magnetite-hematite) is only about 10^{−70} at 25 °C, but it is about 0.2 atmospheres in the Earth's atmosphere, so some sedimentary environments are far more oxidizing than those in magmas. Other sedimentary environments, such as the environments for formation of black shale, are relatively reducing.

=== Metamorphic rocks ===
Oxygen fugacities during metamorphism extend to higher values than those in magmatic environments, because of the more oxidizing compositions inherited from some sedimentary rocks. Nearly pure hematite is present in some metamorphosed banded iron formations. In contrast, native nickel-iron is present in some serpentinites.

=== Extraterrestrial rocks ===
Within meteorites, the iron-wüstite redox buffer may be more appropriate for describing the oxygen fugacity of these extraterrestrial systems.

== Redox effects and sulfur ==
Sulfide minerals such as pyrite (FeS_{2}) and pyrrhotite (Fe_{1−x}S) occur in many ore deposits. Pyrite and its polymorph marcasite also are important in many coal deposits and shales. These sulfide minerals form in environments more reducing than that of the Earth's surface. When in contact with oxidizing surface waters, sulfides react: sulfate (SO_{4}^{2−}) forms, and the water becomes acidic and charged with a variety of elements, some potentially toxic. Consequences can be environmentally harmful, as discussed in the entry for acid mine drainage.

Sulfur oxidation to sulfate or sulfur dioxide also is important in generating sulfur-rich volcanic eruptions, like those of Pinatubo in 1991 and El Chichon in 1982. These eruptions contributed unusually large quantities of sulfur dioxide to the Earth's atmosphere, with consequent effects on atmospheric quality and on climate. The magmas were unusually oxidizing, almost two log units more so than the NiNiO buffer. The calcium sulfate, anhydrite, was present as phenocrysts in the erupted tephra. In contrast, sulfides contain most of the sulfur in magmas more reducing than the FMQ buffer.

== See also ==
- Ellingham diagram
- Normative mineralogy
